= Cetacean bycatch =

Accidental capture of porpoises, whales and dolphins

Group of Fraser's dolphins

Cetacean bycatch (or cetacean by-catch) is the accidental capture of non-target cetaceans such as dolphins, porpoises, and whales by commercial fisheries. Bycatch can be caused by entanglement in fishing nets and lines, or direct capture by hooks or in trawl nets.

Cetacean bycatch is increasing in intensity and frequency. This trend is likely to continue due to the pressures of human population growth on the environment, the growing popularity of seafood, and the commercialization of deep-sea fishing as operations expand into waters which were previously protected. These commercial fishing vessels come into both direct and indirect contact with cetaceans. An example of direct contact is the physical contact of cetaceans with fishing nets. Indirect contact occurs through marine food chains, which are destabilized by the commercial fishermen severely reducing local fish populations that cetaceans rely on for food. In commercial fishing practices, cetaceans are captured as bycatch but then retained because of their value as food or bait.

== Bycatch trends ==
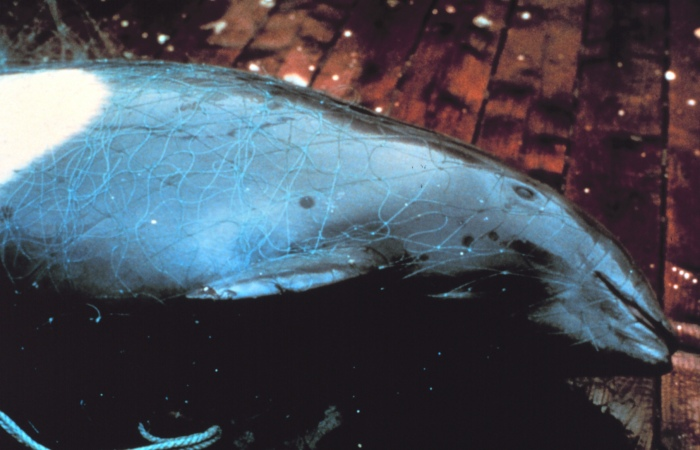
A Dall's porpoise caught in a fishing net

Generally, cetacean bycatch is increasing. Most of the world's cetacean bycatch occurs in gillnet fisheries. The mean annual bycatch in the U.S. alone from 1990 to 1999 was 6,215 marine mammals, with dolphins and porpoises being the primary cetaceans caught in gillnets. Based on global bycatch observation of U.S. fisheries, an estimated 653,365 marine mammals, comprising 307,753 cetaceans and 345,611 pinnipeds were caught from 1990 to 1994. Over 300,000 cetaceans die each year from entanglement in fishing gear and fisheries bycatch.

While gillnets are a principal concern, other types of nets also pose a problem: trawl nets, purse seines, beach seines, longline gear, and driftnets. Driftnets are known for high rates of bycatch and they affect all cetaceans and other marine species. They are fatal for small toothed whales (Odontocetes) and sperm whales, as well as other marine vertebrates such as sharks, sea birds and sea turtles. Many fisheries routinely use driftnets exceeding the EU size limit of 2.5 km/boat. This illegal drift-netting is a major issue, especially in important feeding and breeding grounds for cetaceans.

The tuna industry has achieved successes in reversing cetacean bycatch trends. International recognition of the problem of cetacean bycatch in tuna fishing led to the Agreement on the International Dolphin Conservation Program in 1999 and overall there has been a dramatic reduction in death rates. In particular, dolphin bycatch in tuna fishing in the East Tropical Pacific has dropped from 500,000 per year in 1970 to 100,000 per year in 1990, to 3,000 per year in 1999, and to 1,000 per year in 2006.

A shark culling program in Queensland, which has killed roughly 50,000 sharks since 1962, has also killed thousands of dolphins as bycatch. "Shark control" programs in both Queensland and New South Wales use shark nets and drum lines, which entangle and kill dolphins. Queensland's "shark control" program has killed more than 1,000 dolphins in recent years, and at least 32 dolphins have been killed in Queensland since 2014. A shark culling program in KwaZulu-Natal, South Africa has killed at least 2,310 dolphins.

In addition to being caught as bycatch during active fishing large cetaceans, especially whales, can become entangled in lost or abandoned fishing gear. This problem, known as whale entanglement, is now considered a greater threat to large whales than whaling. Fishing gear can take hundreds of years to break down in a marine environment, and can drift far from areas of fishing activity. Whales migrating long distances can encounter nets and ropes in shipping lanes and fishing areas and become entangled, injured, and infected, suffering for months before dying.

== Cetaceans at risk ==
Bycatch is recognized as a primary threat to all cetaceans. The following cetaceans are at high risk for entanglement in gillnets:

=== Atlantic humpback dolphins ===
The Atlantic humpback dolphin (Sousa teuszii) is endemic to West Africa. Several stocks have been identified with numbers ranging from tens to a few hundred. Abundance estimates are lacking. Gaps in the species range and hence distribution are evident. Bycatch is only documented in a few West African countries. Surveys and evaluations need to be conducted to determine the presence/absence of humpback dolphins in their historical range. Conservation measures need to be implemented to save this species. Because many people live off the sea, it is not feasible to have complete gillnet closures. Some areas may be designated as off-limits to gillnet fisheries. Eco-tourism may be implemented successfully because of high species diversity.

=== Baleen whales ===
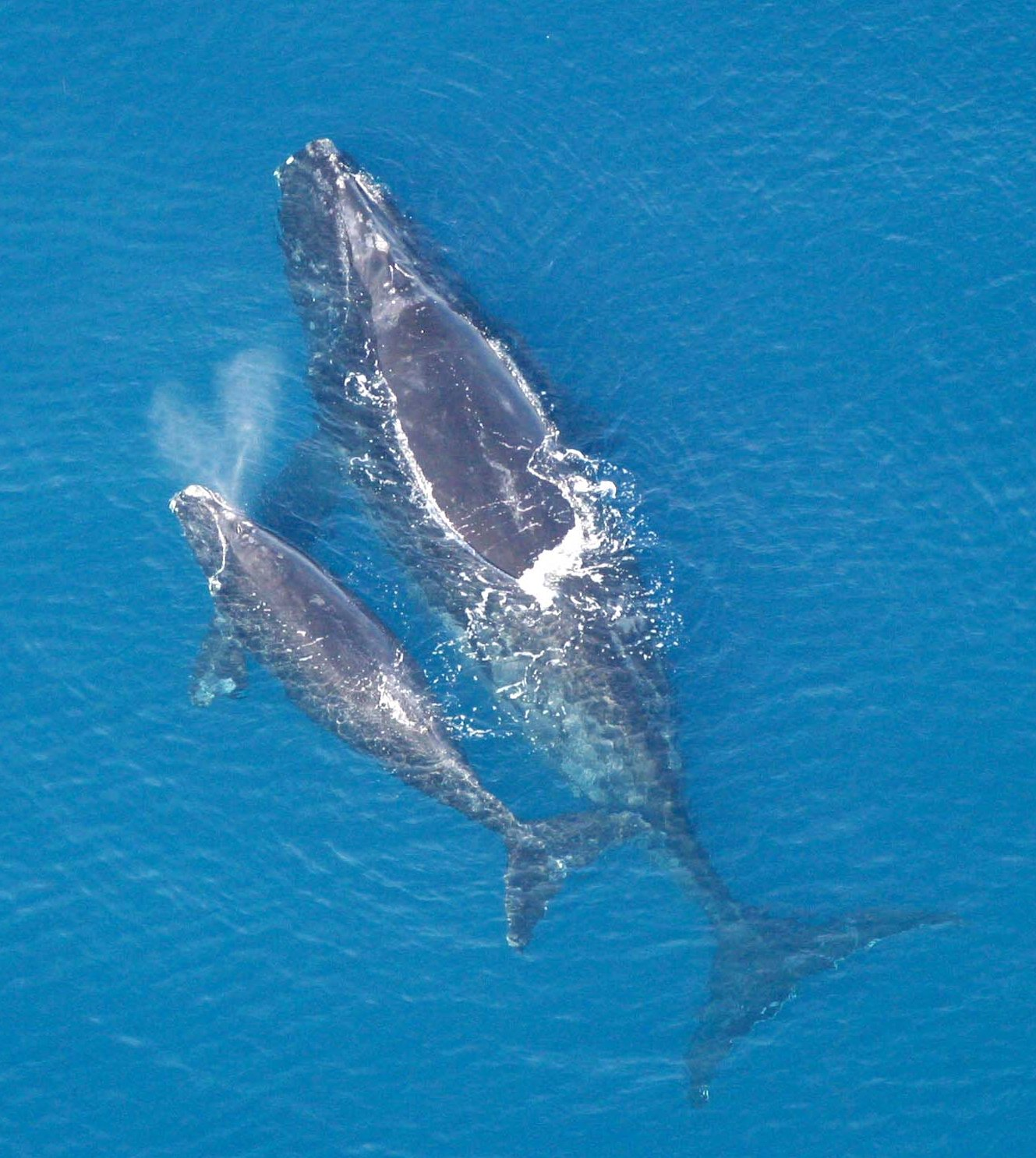
North Atlantic right whale mother and calf

Baleen whales (Mysticeti) are often taken in gill-nets and in fisheries that use vertical lines to mark traps and pots. Large cetaceans such as humpback and right whales may carry off gear after entanglement. This explains the large scars borne by whales along the U.S. Atlantic coast. Analyses show that 50-70% of Gulf of Maine humpback whales (Megaptera novaeangliae) and North Atlantic right whale (Eubalaena glacialis) have been entangled at least once in their lifetime. The North Atlantic right whale is one of the most endangered large cetaceans; only 300-350 individuals remain. Minke whales (Balaenoptera acutorostrata) are also at risk.

=== Burmeister's porpoises ===
The Burmeister's porpoise (Phocoena spinipinnis) is one of three cetaceans that are most often bycaught in Peru and Chile. Several thousand porpoises are caught each year in Peru alone. Bycatch is a frequent occurrence for this species because of the inability to detect them in the water. Surveys have shown that bycatch remains a concern in that area today, and it is unknown whether the population is declining. Reliable data, conservation measures, and public awareness are all lacking. These porpoises are cryptic, making surveying a challenge. It is also difficult to estimate the extent of the bycatch, because the sale of porpoise meat is no longer available at markets.

=== Commerson's dolphins ===
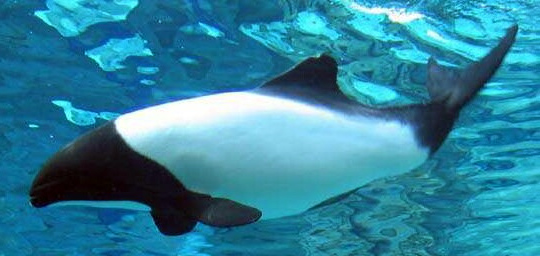
A Commerson's dolphin in an aquarium

The expanding trawl fisheries devastated the Commerson's dolphin (Cephalorhynchus commersonii) populations in Patagonia. Trawl fisheries greatly expanded for twenty years until they crashed in 1997. Pelagic squid fisheries took over, which use pelagic trawls that are harmful to both dusky, short-beaked common dolphins and Commerson's dolphins. There are approximately 21,000 Commerson's dolphins remaining today. Two stocks have been identified in the population, but genetic information and bycatch levels are unknown. With anchovy fisheries expanding, it is imperative to assess the Commerson's dolphin population before these fisheries grow. The seasonal operation of in-shore gillnet fisheries are known to involve bycatch of cetaceans. Presently, there are no known estimates of gillnet bycatch. The bycatch problem in Argentina is political in nature. Improvements in fishing technology, public awareness, and a large-scale survey of the impact of bycatch on Commerson's dolphin populations are essential.

=== La Plata dolphins ===
The La Plata or Franciscana dolphin (Pontoporia blainvillei) is the most threatened small cetacean in the southwest Atlantic Ocean due to bycatch. They are only found in the coastal waters of Argentina, Brazil, and Uruguay. This species has been divided into four ranges (FMU's: Franciscana Management Units) for management and conservation purposes. These populations are genetically different. Mortality rates are 1.6% for FMU 4 and 3.3% for FMU 3, but it is unknown whether these estimates are accurate. Aerial surveys have proven inconclusive so far as to the population numbers of franciscanas. To rectify this situation, more surveys are needed as well as political commitment, awareness campaigns, and bycatch mitigation techniques.

=== Harbour porpoises ===
There is substantial incidental catches in fishing operations. Often, the harbour porpoise (Phocoena phocoena) is killed by incidental bycatch (10, 11, 12). Gillnets pose a serious threat to the harbour porpoise as they are extremely susceptible to entanglement. A study by Caswell et al. in the western North Atlantic combined the mean annual rate of increase of the harbour porpoise with the uncertainty of incidental mortality and population size. It was found that the incidental mortality exceeds critical values, thus showing bycatch is a significant threat to the harbour porpoise. Harbour porpoises become entangled in nets due to their inability to detect the nets before collision. In 2001, 80 harbour porpoises were killed in salmon gillnet fisheries in British Columbia, Canada.

=== Hector's and Maui's dolphins ===
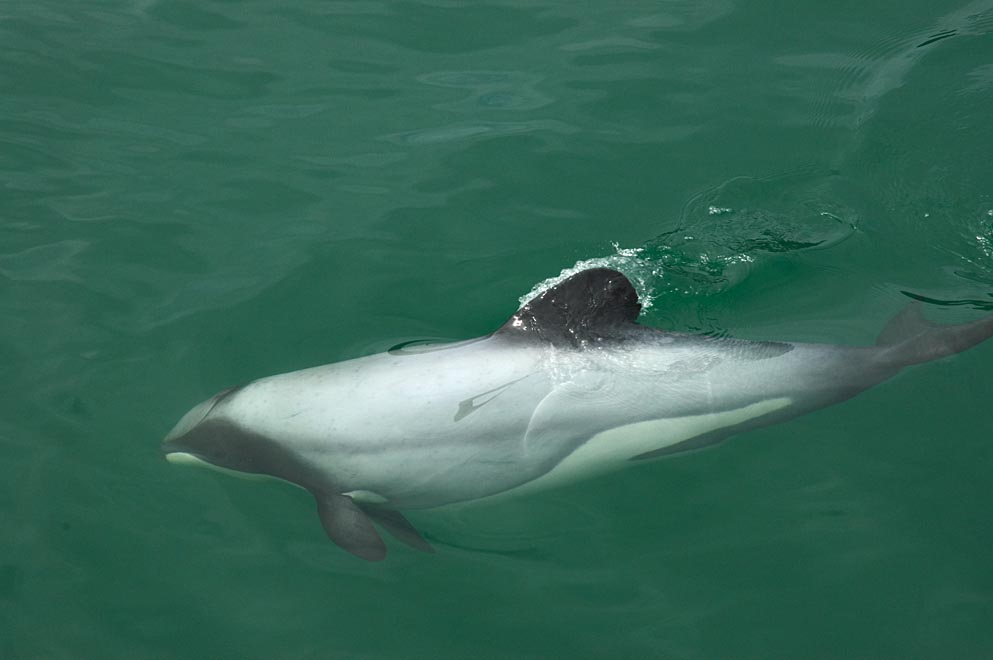
Hector's dolphins have a unique rounded dorsal fin.

In New Zealand, these dolphins have a high rate of entanglement. Hector's dolphin (Cephalorhynchus hectori) is endemic to the coastal waters of New Zealand and there are about 7,400 in abundance. A small population of Hector's dolphins is isolated on the west coast of the island and have been declared a subspecies called Maui's dolphin. Maui's dolphins (Cephalorhynchus hectori maui) are often caught in set nets and pair trawlers resulting in less than 100 left in the wild. For protection, a section of the dolphin's range on the west coast has been closed to gillnet fisheries.

=== Indo-Pacific humpback and bottlenose dolphins ===
Drift and bottom-set gillnets are the biggest conservation threat to these dolphins in the Indian Ocean. There have only been assessments in some areas, such as Zanzibar. Hunting, until 1996, reduced the population and contributed to its decline. Now hunting has been replaced with eco-tourism. It was estimated in 2001 that there are 161 bottlenose dolphins (Tursiops aduncus) and 71 Indo-Pacific humpback dolphin (Sousa chinensis) remaining based on photo-identification mark-recapture techniques. A study revealed over 160 incidences of bycatch since 2000. Approximately 30% of bycatch is in drift and bottom-set gillnets. Mortality is about 8% and 5.6% for bottlenose and humpback dolphins, respectively . The mitigation of bycatch is imperative for these species and for eco-tourism.

=== Irrawaddy dolphins ===
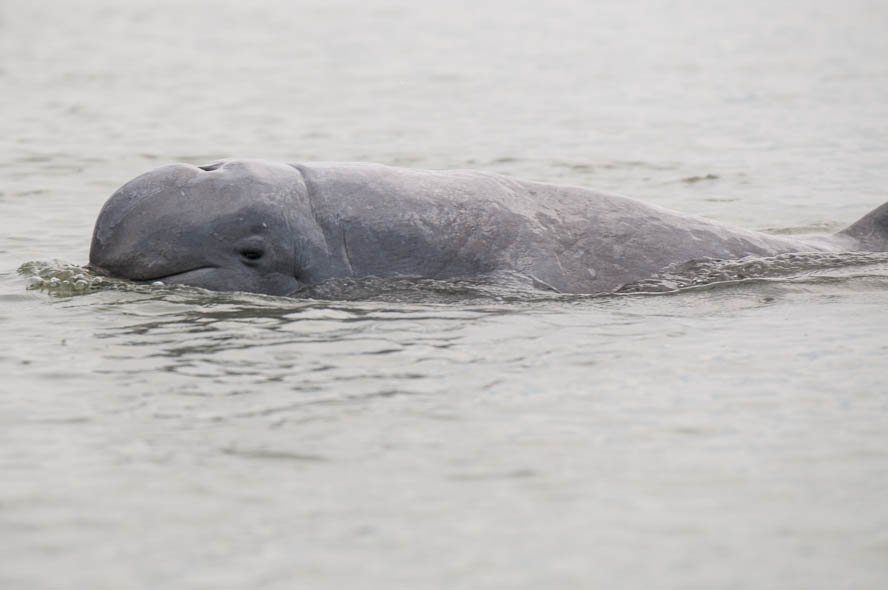
Irrawaddy dolphin

Based on a survey in 2001, fewer than 70 Irrawaddy dolphins (Orcaella brevirostris) remain in the upper region of the Malampaya Sound in the Philippines and only 69 individuals in the Mekong River. They have been severely impacted by lift nets and crab gear, thus critically endangered. It is estimated that mortality from bycatch may be greater than 4.5% in Malampaya Sound and 5.8% in the Mekong River. The population is declining dramatically. Current bycatch levels are unsustainable, and bycatch reduction measures, as well as long-term systematic monitoring, are urgently required. The elimination of gillnets from areas of high use is needed, and economic incentives need to be provided to the local people.

=== Spinner and Fraser's dolphins ===
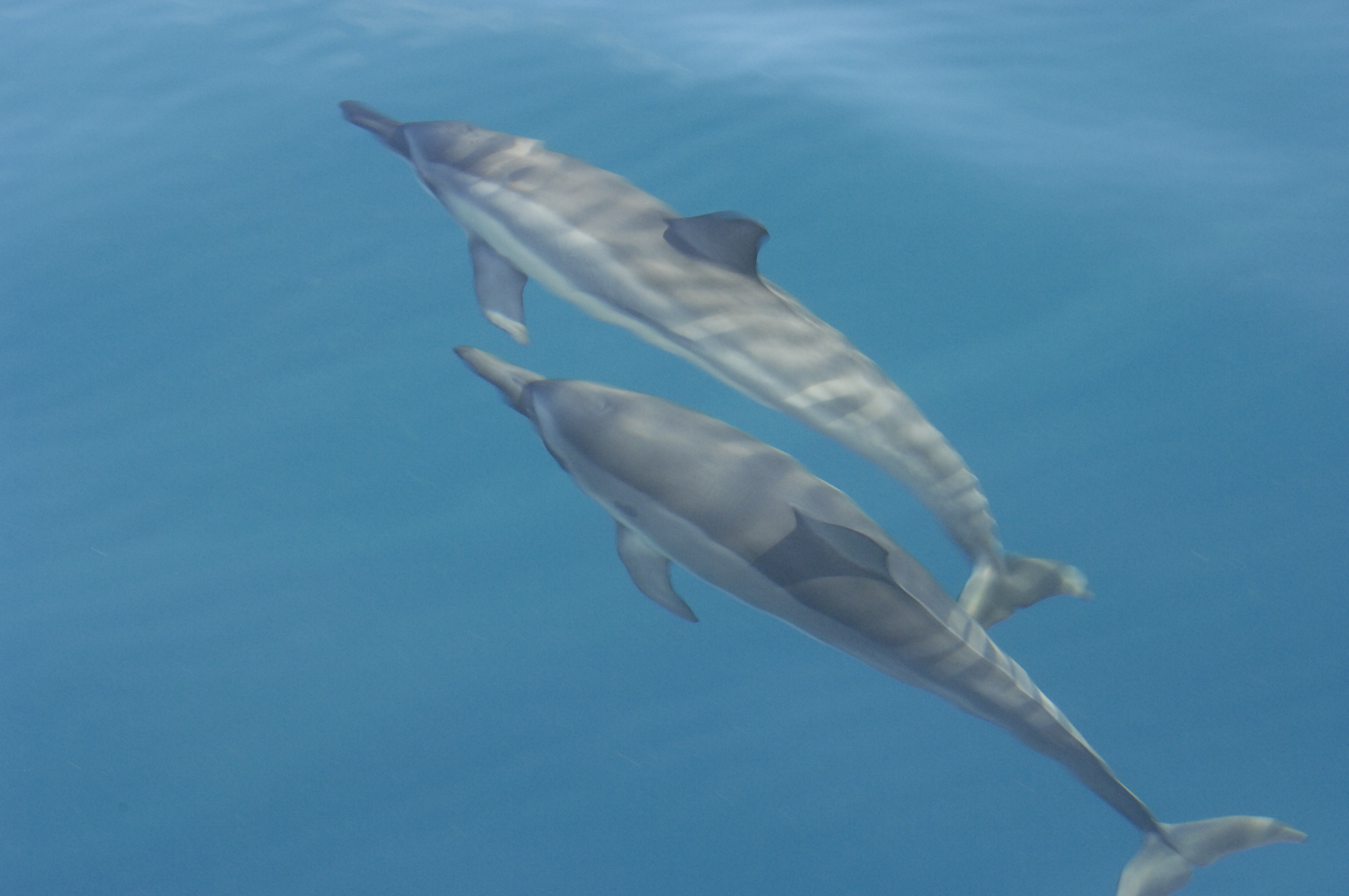
Spinner dolphins

In the Philippines, tuna driftnet fisheries have a substantial impact on the populations. One tuna fishery alone kills 400 spinner dolphins (Stenella longirostris) and Fraser's dolphins (Lagenodelphis hosei) each year. Round-haul nets are an even greater concern with a bycatch of up to 3000 dolphins per year. Dolphins that are bycaught often end up as shark bait for longline fisheries. There is not enough data to conclude the total bycatch for the Philippines. Initial assessment indicates that bycatch is not sustainable. Monitoring of dolphin populations and fisheries is urgently needed.

=== Yangtze River dolphins and finless porpoises ===
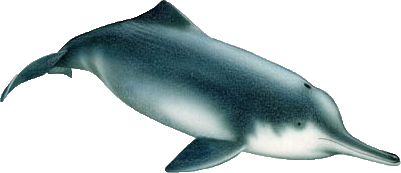
Illustration of a Baiji dolphin.

The Yangtze River or Baiji dolphin (Lipotes vexillifer) is one of the most endangered cetaceans that is only found in the Yangtze River, China. A survey conducted in 1997 found only thirteen dolphins. A later survey in 2006 found no individuals in their former range, and as such, the species was declared functionally extinct - the first cetacean to become functionally extinct primarily due to bycatch (among other factors). However, there have been various sightings since then. The Yangtze River finless porpoise (Neophocaena phocaenoides asiaeorientalis) also lives in the Yangtze River. Abundance has declined; there are fewer than 2000 porpoises left. This may be due, in part, to the construction of the Three Gorges Dam, which covers a significant amount of the dolphin's natural habitat. Both species are often subject to entanglement in gillnets.

=== Vaquita ===
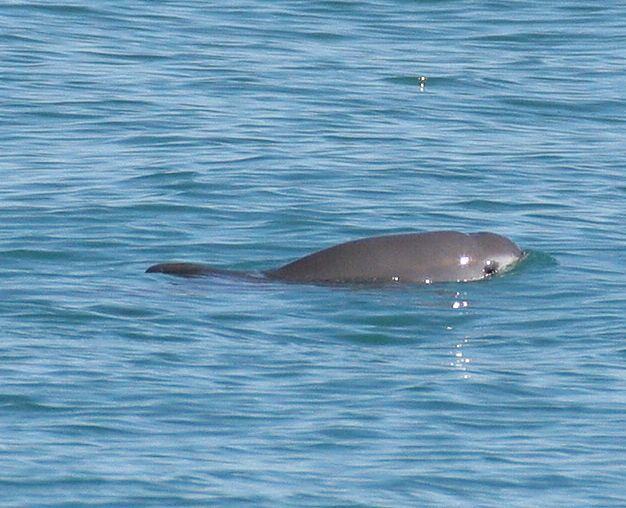
A vaquita surfacing.

The vaquita (Phocoena sinus) is the smallest and most endangered cetacean. Endemic to the upper Gulf of California in Mexico, they are killed in both gillnets and trawl nets from commercial fishing and poaching. The vaquita shares its habitat with the totoaba (Totoaba macdonaldi), a highly valued fish in black markets due to the perceived medicinal value of its swim bladder. As of 2024, there are less than 8 individuals left in the Gulf of California, making the species functionally extinct similar to the baiji.

== Mitigating bycatch ==
=== Acoustic deterrent devices ===
The use of acoustic alarms to mitigate by-catch and to protect aquaculture sites has been proposed. Acoustic deterrent devices, or pingers, have reduced the number of cetaceans caught in gill nets. Harbour porpoises have been effectively excluded from bottom-set gill nets during many experiments for instance in the Gulf of Maine, along the Olympic Peninsula, in the Bay of Fundy, and in the North Sea. All of these studies show up to a 90% decrease in harbour porpoise bycatch. Pingers work by producing a sound that is aversive to the cetaceans (20; 15). There has been a recent re-evaluation of the potential benefit of pingers, and their use in other fisheries has expaneded due to their growing success. An experiment on the California drift gill net fishery demonstrated how acoustic pingers reduce marine mammal bycatch. It showed that bycatch was significantly reduced for common dolphins and sea lions. Bycatch rates were also lower for other cetacean species, such as the Northern right whale dolphin, Pacific white-sided dolphin, Risso's dolphin, and Dall's porpoise. It is agreed upon that the more pingers on a net, the less bycatch. There was a 12-fold decrease in common dolphin entanglement using a net with 40 pingers. However, the widespread use of pingers along coastlines effectively excludes cetaceans such as porpoises from their prime habitat and resources. Cetaceans, extremely sensitive to noise, are effectively driven from their preferred coastal habitats by the use of these acoustic devices. In poorer quality habitats, harbour porpoises are subjected to increased competition for resources. This situation is recognized as range contraction, which can be a result of climate change, anthropogenic activity, or population decline. Large-scale range contractions are considered indicative of impending extinction. A similar form of deterrent is noise pollution originating from vessel traffic.

=== Passive deterrents ===
In 2026 the Scientific Committee of the International Whaling Commission highlighted work done in southern Brazil on passive acoustic deterrents on gillnets made from 250 ml plastic bottles. The sealed, empty bottles are attached every 130 m along the net, and act as highly reflective acoustic mirrors to a dolphin's sonar. Field trials showed an 88% reduction in dolphin bycatch with no reduction in fish catch. The Scientific Committee recommending adding this inexpensive method to the IWC Bycatch Mitigation Initiative Toolbox.

=== Barium sulfate ===
A promising gillnet that is effective in reducing bycatch for harbor porpoises contains barium sulfate. These nets are detected at a greater distance than conventional nets because the barium sulfate reflects the cetaceans' echolocation signal, thus rendering the nets more detectable by these animals. Barium sulfate makes the nets stiffer if it is added at high concentration. All three factors - echo reflectivity, stiffness, and visibility - may be important in reducing bycatch. Echo reflectivity appears to depend on particle size, not density. The denser iron oxide produced no reduction in bycatch. Fish takes in the Bay of Fundy were normal, except for haddock takes, which were down by 3-5%. The advantage of this approach is that it is passive and thus does not require batteries, and there is no "dinner bell" effect. The potential advantage of these nets is greatest in the artisanal fishery. NOAA is planning further testing to verify the effectiveness of the nets.

=== Fishing regulations and management ===
Management and regulation are severely lacking in many fisheries today. Management measures are urgently needed to monitor fisheries (and illegal fisheries) to protect cetaceans. Efforts to document bycatch should focus on gill-net fisheries, because cetaceans are more likely to be caught in gill-nets. Conservation efforts should be directed to areas where marine mammal bycatch is high but where no infrastructure exists to assess the impact. In general, there is a lack of reporting on a global scale of cetacean bycatch.

In the U.S., the Marine Mammal Protection Act prohibits the use and sale of marine mammals captured by commercial fisheries. Similar legislations prohibit the use and sale of marine mammals in other countries. A marine mammal mortality monitoring program for commercial fisheries is operating in the U.S., where "Take Reduction Teams" observe the extent of bycatch and then formulate strategies to reduce bycatch, with "Take Reduction Plans" put into place.

=== Temporary closure ===
As another potential mitigation measure, temporary closure of fisheries during the short periods of the year when cetaceans are migrating through the area would significantly decrease bycatch.

=== Observers on boat ===
Another mitigation measure is to use observers on fishing vessels to spot cetaceans in the water in order to avoid bycatch.

==== In the U.S. ====
Some programs like Earth Island Institute's Dolphin Safe Label certification claim to require certification from onboard observers. However, the only fishery in the world where independent scientific observers certify whether a dolphin has been harmed is the Eastern Tropical Pacific, home to the AIDCP Treaty program. For all other tuna fisheries of the world, the efficacy of onboard observer certification has come under increasing scrutiny as such programs have proven indefensible or unmanageable:

In an interview with Radio Australia last year, Mark Palmer of EII confirmed that it is mostly the case that EII monitors do not go on board of the vessels, and their organization does not have the kind of resources to put observers on the "many thousands" of ships that are out there catching tuna.

Additionally, environmental groups have criticized Earth Island Institute's support of U.S. policies that do not require independent, on-board observation and instead only rely on self-certification by fishing captains. Even if there is a requirement of independent observers, the lack of uniformity in tracing and verifying certifications in different countries implies that non-certified products can still become certified if they are taken to a different port.

=== Other ways of mitigating bycatch ===
- Implementing gear technology (changes in fishing gear and practices) was documented to mitigate cetacean bycatch.
- Buying tuna and other seafood that has a dolphin safe label.
- Buying Sustainable seafood.
- Supporting sustainable seafood companies and restaurants.
- Raising international awareness to assess, monitor, and mitigate bycatch problems.
- Creating legislation on responsible fishing practices.
- Developing and promote industry adoption of "Best Practice Guidelines" for fishing operations.
