= Whale entanglement =

Entanglement of whales in fishing gear

Humpback whale entangled with ropes and 20 litre water drums, New South Wales, Australia

Whale entanglement is a form of cetacean bycatch in which whales become entangled in fishing gear. The gear may be lost, discarded, or abandoned; or, when actively in use, the gear may break free and trail behind the whale. Entanglement causes injury and infection, and hinders the ability of the whale to swim and feed, leading to emaciation and in some cases months of suffering. Even after being freed, whales often die from the effects of entanglement.

Entanglement is a significant threat to some populations of whales but the scale of the problem is not fully known, as it can happen far out to sea and whales can succumb unobserved. Procedures and protocols for the hazardous process of freeing entangled whales have been developed, as well as new designs of fishing gear that reduce the possibility of entanglement.

== Causes ==
Globally as much as 10% of marine debris may consist of fishing gear, which can be lost, discarded, or abandoned as a result of theft, vandalism, bad weather, illegal or unreported fishing, or a lack of collection and recycling facilities. Abandoned or discarded fishing gear can drift far from where it was originally lost, accumulating in convergence zones in the ocean, and can take hundreds of years to break down.

Large marine animals such as sharks, sea turtles, and especially whales can become entangled in fishing gear. Whales can undertake long seasonal migrations, making them prone to encounter ropes and nets in fishing areas or shipping lanes while foraging. Climate change can lead to marine heatwaves that in turn create population booms in whale food (krill and anchovies) nearer the shore, driving whales to forage closer to fixed-gear fisheries.

Whale entanglement appears to be increasing as long-lived marine debris accumulates in the ocean. As lobster and crab fisheries move into increasingly deeper water, thicker ropes are needed to haul the traps and pots to the surface, which increases the impact of entanglement. As well as these pot ropes, whales can become entangled in shark nets, drift nets, midwater trawl nets, long lines, and especially gill nets.

== Impact ==
Left: humpback whale entangled in fishing gear, New South Wales, Australia, 2 August 2025. Right: by 16 September the whale had been disentangled but was infested with whale lice, a sign of poor health

Becoming entangled in fishing gear can prevent marine mammals from reaching the surface, drowning or suffocating them; because many species are adapted for deep diving for tens of minutes, suffocation can be protracted. Entangled whales are capable of breaking ropes and dragging away fishing gear, sometimes for thousands of kilometres. Carrying large amounts of fishing gear, especially floats and long ropes, can affect the whale's ability to swim, feed, and reproduce, leading to slow starvation. Ropes and nets wrapped around the whale's head—the most common place entangled in whales—can interfere with feeding. The increased drag from towing fishing gear is a drain on the whale's energy, so entangled whales are often emaciated. In some populations entanglement is so common that it becomes a chronic life-history condition, reducing the amount of stored energy in the form of blubber and delaying time to reproduction by months or years.

Entanglement in ropes and nets can directly injure whales, cutting into fins and flukes and causing mild to severe wounds and septicemia, as well as prolonged suffering. The continual swimming motion of the whale can cause lacerations across the back or around a flipper or tail fluke, cutting down to the bone.

An entangled whale can develop infections, become infested with whale lice, and lose half its body weight. North Atlantic right whales (Eubalaena glacialis) entangled from more than several weeks will often succumb to secondary complications. Entangled right whales take on average six months to die, but can survive for years. Even if the whale frees itself from ropes, recovery from infection can take a year. This suffering, researchers argue, needs to be taken into account in addition to the total deaths from entanglement.

Only a small fraction of entanglement incidents are documented; many whales probably die unobserved. Coastal whale species in areas with active fishing are the most vulnerable to entanglement, and the most likely to be documented; the National Oceanic and Atmospheric Administration (NOAA) has recorded whale entanglement incidents off the West Coast of the USA since 1982.

The whale species known to be most impacted by entanglement are the North Atlantic right whale and the humpback whale (Megaptera novaeangliae). Estimates from visible scars are that 73–82% of North Atlantic right whales have been entangled at some point in their lives, 1 to 6 times per individual, with 4–33% of the population being newly entangled each year. The reduced health from entanglement appears to have lowered the fertility of female right whales in the population, increasing the time between calves from three years to five years. Entanglement was the leading cause of death for the eight Northwest Atlantic whale species between 1970 and 2009.

In south-eastern Alaska 8% of the humpback whale population on average became entangled each year, and 52% have been entangled at least once. Humpback whale entanglement in set fishing gear along Australia's east coast has been increasing, from around 20 recorded incidents in 2017 to 45 in 2024, and 48 in 2025. Today, with whaling now only practised by a few countries, the two biggest threats to whales are entanglement in fishing gear and collisions with ships.

== Rescue ==
Video
- Center for Coastal Studies, Provincetown, Massachusetts
- Marine animal entanglement response
- Rescuing humpback whale 'Crinkle'

NOAA team freeing a humpback whale from fishing gear, Kona Coast, Hawaii

It is possible for well-trained teams to disentangle whales from fishing gear using specialised equipment such as hooked knives on poles, floats attached to the gear to slow the whale, and grappling hooks. Being able to cut the correct lines in the right order is critical to success, and expertise and favourable weather are required. The process is dangerous, involving unpredicable whales, changing weather conditions, sharp knives, and high-tension ropes. Untrained members of the public who attempt to free whales can injure them further, and would-be rescuers have been drowned in the attempt.

In the late 1970s Jon Lien at Memorial University of Newfoundland was approached by fishermen wanting help disentangling whales from their nets. This led to him founding the Whale Research Group and its Entrapment Assistance Program (now the Whale Release and Strandings group), pioneering techniques that are now used worldwide to free entangled whales. In 2011 the International Whaling Commission (IWC) launched the Global Whale Entanglement Response Network, in partnership with the Centre for Coastal Studies in Provincetown, a training programme to run workshops in entanglement response around the world.

Tracking entangled whales depends on public reporting, and no centralised database for monitoring incidents and coordinating rescue efforts yet exists. Once a whale is reported, satellite trackers can be attached to the fishing gear to help rescue teams intercept it, and software tools can predict the movement of an affected whale using data on ocean conditions and migration routes. Weather conditions and daylight hours can prevent rescuers from intervening immediately, however, and many entangled animals cannot be relocated after being reported. Even after being freed, entangled whales may never recover, and can suffer chronic injury before dying or stranding far away from the rescue location.

== Prevention ==
Rope scars on the tail of a humpback whale, Sydney, Australia

Safer practices in the fishing industry could reduce the incidence of whale entanglement. This could include seasonal fishing closures, better management of fishing gear, or improvements in the design of gear itself. Where laws have failed to prevent whale entanglement, seafood consumers could demand changes in fishing practices through boycotts, seafood certification, and publicity campaigns, as was done with dolphin-safe tuna. There has been widespread public concern over humane methods in marine mammal harvests or the fisheries bycatch of dolphins and seals, but because whale entanglement happens at sea, out of sight, there has been less public pressure to prevent it.

The Whale Research Group in Newfoundland developed several tools for preventing entanglement in fishing nets: acoustic alerts, flickering discs, and clangers to warn whales of the presence of nets. One of their inventions, the Aqualert, is attached to a net and pings every three seconds using a hammer-and-anvil mechanism operated by a six-volt battery.

In 2017 several North Atlantic right whales died from entanglement, most of them in the vertical bouy lines used to mark crab pots. This prompted increased interest in ropeless fishing gear to reduce entanglement, and allow fishing in areas that would otherwise be closed to protect whales. One design of ropeless trap uses inflatable bouys triggered by a remote signal to raise the trap to the surface. Changes in rope manufacture since the 1990s have increased rope strength, causing more severe injuries to whales and making it harder for them to break free; adopting ropes with lower breaking strengths could reduce entanglement in some species by 72% while still meeting the needs of fishing vessels.

== See also ==
- Whale conservation
- Bycatch
