= Samuel LaBudde =

American biologist

- Occupation: Biologist
- Awards: Goldman Environmental Prize (1991)

Samuel Freeman LaBudde is an American biologist. He was awarded the Goldman Environmental Prize in 1991 for his efforts on preserving dolphins and other marine species.

He began his career as a biologist by spending six months at sea videotaping the practice by tuna fishermen of encircling and killing dolphins. This exposed the largest slaughter of marine mammals in history and sparked a successful consumer boycott, forcing major tuna brands to accept only dolphin-safe fish and prompting the U.S. Congress to enact bans on the encirclement of dolphins by U.S. vessels, and imports of dolphin-deadly tuna.

His next and second project involved a high-seas expedition into the North Pacific with an all-volunteer crew aboard a small wooden sailboat to expose the Asian driftnet fleets, the largest and most destructive fishery in history. This effort resulted in a UN ban on the use of pelagic driftnets.

He has also been engaged in exposing the trade in walrus ivory, the illegal trade in tigers, rhinoceros, bears, primates and other species, securing protection for wilderness habitat (including creation of a national park system in Gabon), halting construction of coal-fired power plants and other major polluting industries in the Midwest U.S., and recent successful efforts at the Montreal Protocol to avoid as much as several hundred gigatonnes of CO2e emissions.

== Career ==
LaBudde earned his B.A. in Biology, Indiana University in 1986 and performed graduate work in evolution and ecology.

Since late 2012, he has served as an international climate analyst for the Institute for Governance and Sustainable Development (IGSD). His initial focus at IGSD continued efforts begun in association with the Environmental Investigation Agency (EIA) to evolve the Montreal Protocol by securing an amendment to enable a global phase-down of hydrofluorocarbons or HFCs. In 2014 LaBudde initiated a parallel effort in concert with Lawrence Berkeley National Laboratories (LBNL) to significantly increase energy efficiencies within the global cooling sector as a means of doubling or trebling the quantity of avoided CO2e emissions resulting from an HFC phase-down. Since the Montreal Protocol's adoption of an HFC Amendment in November 2016 (Kigali Amendment), LaBudde has continued work to enlarge the effectiveness of the Montreal Protocol in mitigating anthropogenic emissions from halogenated gases and energy consumption in the global cooling sector.

From January 2008 to August 2012, LaBudde was the Campaign Director of the Washington, D.C.-based EIA. He was in charge of prosecuting international campaign for oceans, climate and wildlife, and principally efforts to phase out the manufacture and use of HFCs. During this time he was also responsible for creating the most well funded campaign in EIA's history (on HFCs/Montreal Protocol) and instrumental in challenging the World Bank's ongoing role in distributing hundreds of millions of dollars in payments under the Kyoto Protocol's Clean Development Mechanism (CDM) to HCFC-22 manufacturers, primarily in China and India. Following the announcement by the EU in March 2012 that they would no longer purchase carbon credits from HCFC-22 manufacturers, and the removal of a major impediment to adoption of an HFC Amendment buy the Montreal Protocol, LaBudde began efforts that he would continue with IGSD to secure accession by India and other developing nations to an HFC Amendment.

LaBudde acted as a consultant to ValleyWatch from 2002-2008 where he initiated and organized a campaign blocking construction of the world's largest soybean processing plant by ConAgra Foods. He also assisted in the development and prosecution of regional efforts blocking construction of more than a dozen proposed coal and coal waste burning power plants in Midwest including a 1500 MW unit by Peabody Coal. During this time, LaBudde also acted as a consultant and wrote numerous white papers and internal documents for executives and senior management among Fortune 500 companies and others on social, economic and environmental merits of green building & energy efficiency including BP, Siemens, GE, Shell Oil, Microsoft, and the U.S. Green Building Council.

From 1991 to 2004, he was the founder and executive director of the Endangered Species Project and supervised and financed extensive field investigations throughout Asia, Africa and Americas to document illegal trade in bears, tigers, rhinos, primates and other endangered species. Secured international resolutions condemning central involvement of China and Taiwan in the illegal wildlife trade. Conducted investigations and campaign exposing Vietnam as center of SE Asian wholesale wildlife trade. Provided funding, video cameras and other equipment for domestic and international NGO campaigns on wildlife and wilderness protection, and for human rights investigations in Burma, Indonesia and Tibet. Organized and led international campaign to expose Asian tiger trade resulting in domestic legal prohibitions against the trade in China, Singapore, South Korea and Taiwan and culminating in implementation of U.S. trade sanctions against Taiwan in 1994 — first economic sanctions in history imposed against a country for violations of an international conservation accord. Participated in first Global Tiger Forum in India. Helped establish International Siberian Tiger Sanctuary in Eastern Russia that brought species back from edge of extinction. Researched, co-authored and produced Crime Against Nature, first comprehensive report & video overview on role of organized crime in the illegal wildlife trade. Documented lowland gorilla and other wildlife populations in Gabonese rainforest and wrote and produced comprehensive national ecotourism prospectus for Gabon as part of successful joint effort with WCS and CI to create national park plan comprising 10% of the nation. Testified in several Congressional hearings and worked extensively with Congress, U.S. Interior Department, U.S. National Security Council and other federal agencies, Convention on International Trade in Endangered Species, International Whaling Commission, European Community and the NGO community to promote wildlife and wilderness protection.

From 1987 to 1992, he was the Staff Biologist/Campaign Director of the Earth Island Institute & Marine Mammal Fund. In 1987 he conducted a six-month undercover investigation exposing the dolphin slaughter by the tuna industry, organized and led domestic campaign resulting in broad industry reforms and reduction of dolphin kills by over 95%. His dolphin video was later seen by a Senate subcommittee and subsequently by packaged tuna manufacturer StarKist, Bumble Bee Foods and Chicken of the Sea. Participated in successful legal and legislative efforts to strengthen and enforce Marine Mammal Protection Act. Member of technical delegation to China to assist in recovery of Baiji or white river dolphin. Helped secure passage of first small cetacean resolutions before International Whaling Commission to protect dolphins and porpoises. Coordinated massive global media campaigns on marine wildlife and fisheries issues.

From 1990 to 1993, he was the European Campaign Director of the Humane Society International, where he devised and prosecuted successful efforts to draft/pass EU legislation prohibiting use of driftnets and against use of purse seines on cetaceans by European fishermen. Conducted successful consumer/media campaigns to ban imports of dolphin deadly tuna to remaining EU markets in Italy and Spain. In 1991, LaBudde was awarded the Goldman Prize for his work exposing the killing of dolphins in tuna fishing, the campaign that resulted in the UN banning driftnets, and his work for the protection of endangered species.

in 1989, he conducted a covert investigation in Alaska exposing illegal killing of walrus for the ivory trade. He also documented consequences of Exxon Valdez oil spill on sea otter population.

From 1988 to 1990, he was also a field biologist and campaign coordinator of Earthtrust and organized and led first high seas expedition to document use of pelagic driftnets by Asian fishermen. He produced briefing documents & campaign video and conducted domestic and international campaigns resulting in passage of U.S. legislation and United Nations General Assembly resolution banning the use of pelagic driftnets.
