= RV Vantuna =

Research vessel

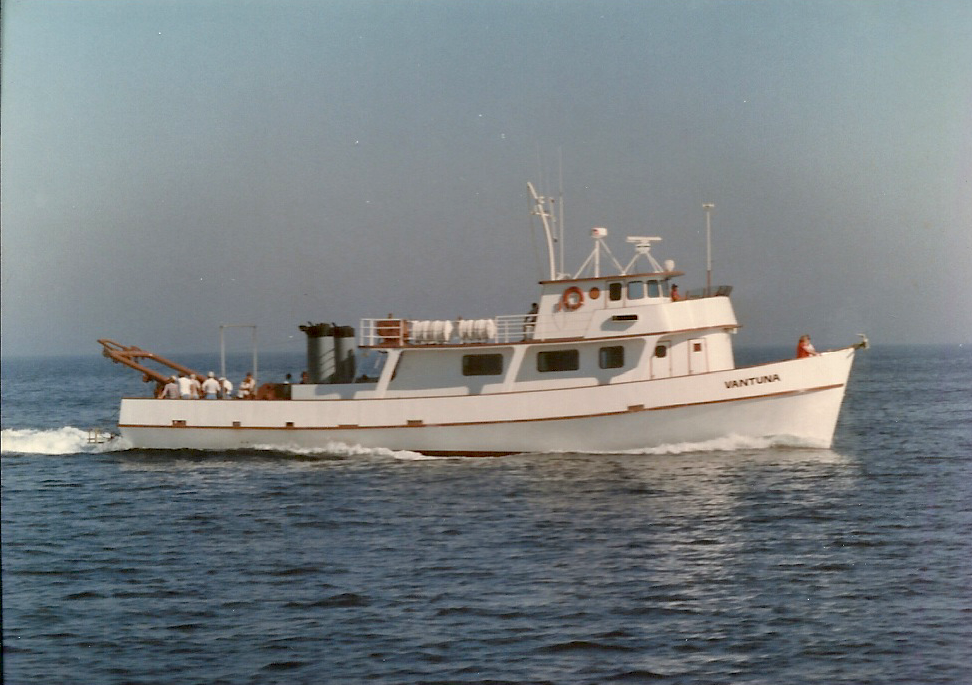
- R/V Vantuna

History

United States
- Name: Vantuna
- Owner: Gilbert C. Van Camp III (1961-1969); Occidental College (1969-2002); California State University, Long Beach (2002-2007)
- Port of registry: Los Angeles, California
- Route: Southern California Bight
- Builder: Ditmar-Donaldson, Costa Mesa, California
- Cost: $150,000
- Launched: 1961
- Fate: Sold into commercial service

General characteristics
- Type: Fishing boat
- Tonnage: 99 tons
- Displacement: 99 long tons (101 t)
- Length: 85 ft (26 m)
- Draft: 6 feet
- Installed power: 2 × 110 V electric generators, 35 kW (47 hp)
- Propulsion: 2 × 450 hp (336 kW) Caterpillar D343 turbo diesel engines; twin screws
- Speed: 14 knots (26 km/h; 16 mph) max speed; 10 knots (19 km/h; 12 mph) nominal
- Range: 1000 nm
- Capacity: 12
- Crew: 4

The Vantuna was a marine research vessel that operated in the Southern California Bight, from 1969 until 2007. It served as a tool for coastal research and was a unique platform for Occidental College students to gain first-hand experience conducting marine research operations. Scores of students who have worked on the Vantuna have gone on to have careers in marine science.

== History ==
The vessel was built in 1961 by Ditmar-Donaldson in Costa Mesa as a personal fishing boat for Gilbert C. Van Camp III, the CEO of the Van Camp Seafood Company and makers of "Chicken of the Sea" tuna. As a fishing boat, the Vantuna was configured for albacore fishing. The vessel held two large, 2,500-US-gallon (9,500 L) live bait tanks and a 15-ton refrigerated fish hold. Metal racks attached to the stern provided platforms for fishermen close to the water's surface. They used long fishing poles with stainless steel leaders and barbless hooks. When large schools of albacore were located, live bait thrown into the water caused the fish to go into a feeding frenzy where they would bite anything, including the barbless hooks of the fishing poles. Fish that were hooked were quickly pulled on board by the fisherman. The barbless hooks would easily fall out of the fish's mouth, and then the fish was moved into the refrigerated hold. Although this was his personal fishing boat, Mr. Van Camp took the fish he caught to the factory, where they were used by his company.

Mr. Van Camp donated the vessel to his undergraduate alma mater, Occidental College, in Los Angeles, California, in 1969 after suffering back problems that restricted his ability to go albacore fishing.

== The vessel ==
The vessel is 85 feet (26 m) long with a displacement of 99 tons. The hull is made of planked mahogany. It had twin screws, powered by two Caterpillar D343 turbo diesel engines, each producing about 450 hp. Although the nominal cruising speed was about 10 knots, the Vantuna could reach a maximum speed around 14 knots. Fuel consumption ranged from 8 US gallons (30 L) per hour to over 20 US gallons (76 L) per hour at the top speed. There were two 110 V electric generators capable of supplying up to 35 kW.

The boat had five staterooms capable of sleeping 16 people with additional bunks in the wheelhouse and a forward crew quarters.

== Conversion to a research vessel ==
Occidental College converted the Vantuna from a fishing boat to a marine research vessel with the help of a National Science Foundation grant. The conversion included the addition of a large A-frame on the stern, hydrographic and large main winches, and the associated hydraulic system.

Professor John S. Stephens Jr., was the director of the Vantuna and the Vantuna Research Group at Occidental College. He created a program where the vessel became a unique platform for research and learning, allowing undergraduate students the opportunity for "hands-on" study of marine biology. These students were in charge of the daily scientific operations conducted on the vessel.

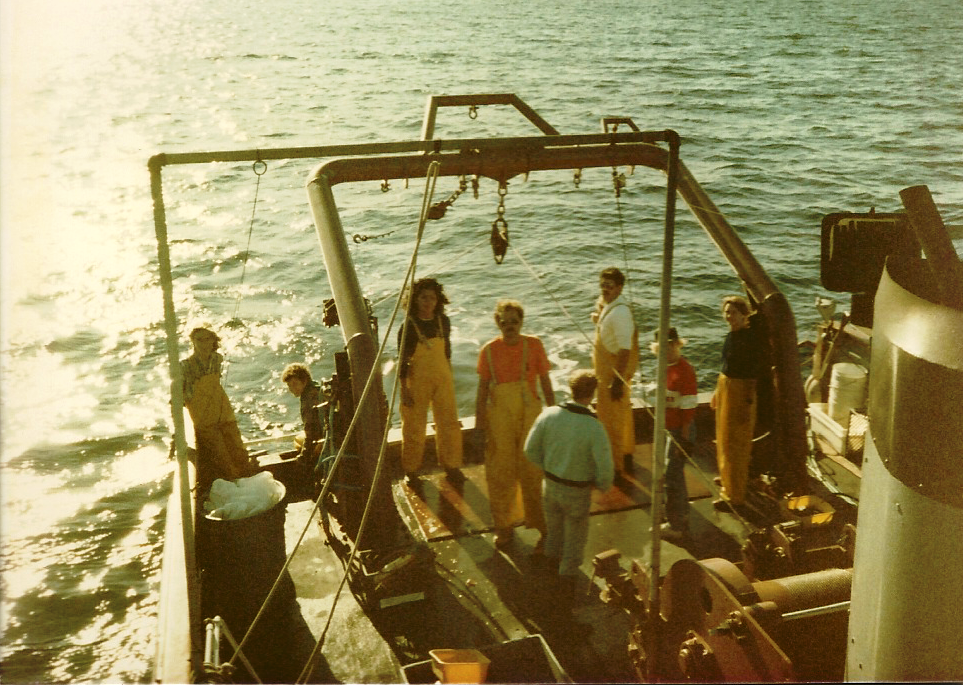
Retrieving a trawl

In no small part, the success of the Vantuna program was due to the efforts of Sara Warschaw, Dr. Stephens' administrative assistant. The instructional program used on the vessel was helped with the efforts of Ruth Lebow, of Pierce College, who wrote the study and laboratory guide for the Vantuna, "Investigations into the Marine Environment, A Guide to the Deep Sea Cruise Aboard the R/V Vantuna".

== Operation ==
The Vantuna conducted about 150 teaching trips per year. Classes from secondary and tertiary schools in Southern California were shown how marine sampling was performed. Instruction was provided by the Occidental College student crew. The student crews were enthusiastic, spending much time on board, learning the scientific techniques as well as the scientific names, biology, and ecology of the organisms that were encountered. Students also helped maintain the boat, with many hours spent painting, scraping, and varnishing.

The following video shows the typical research work performed on the vessel:

Video on YouTube

Physical and ecological data was always collected. This information represents one of the best long term data sets available about benthic fauna in Southern California.

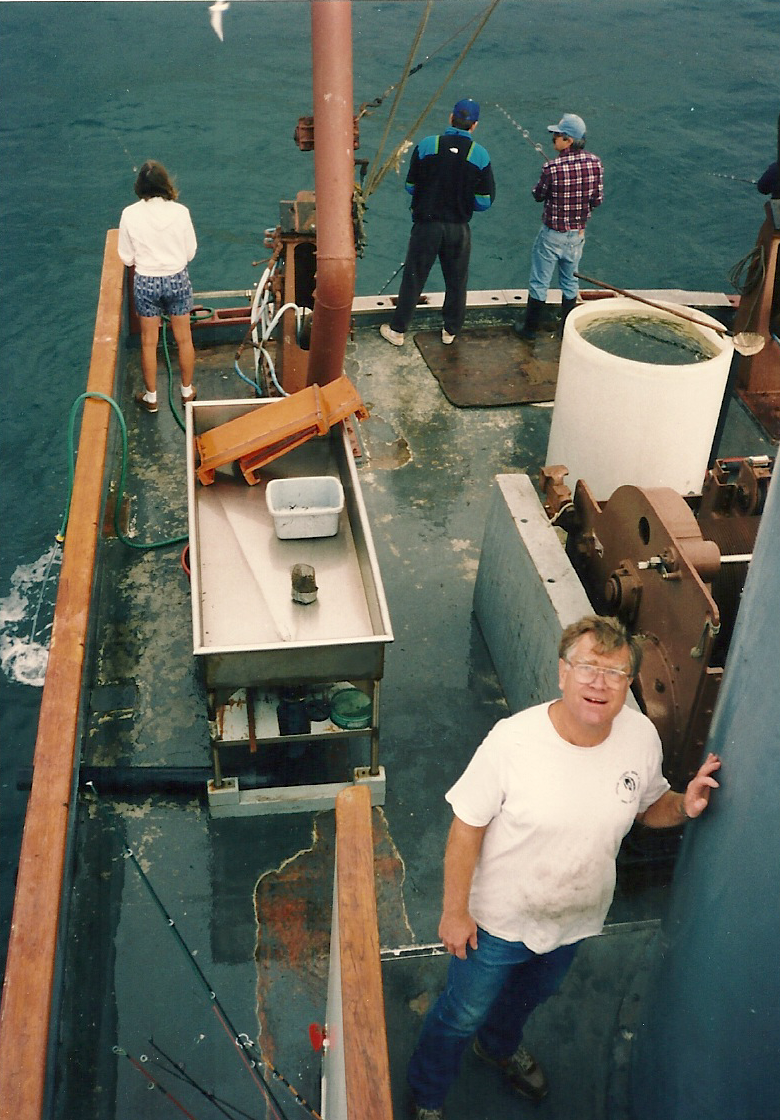
Sampling Kelp Bass

The most common sampling equipment used was:

- Otter Trawl - benthic fauna sampling on "soft" sediment areas.
- Bio dredge - benthic sampling on rocky areas.
- Issacs-Kidd midwater trawl - fauna sampling of mesopelagic and bathypelagic zones (300 m - 1000 m).
- Bottom grab - sediment collection and characterization.
- Plankton tows - collect and identify phytoplankton and zooplankton, particularly ichthyoplankton.
- Seawater sampling -record temperature, salinity, oxygen and acidity.

== Extraordinary events ==
During its life as a research vessel, the Vantuna experienced many extraordinary events. It encountered blue whales near Santa Rosa Island. Missile tracks were viewed from its deck, including a missile fired from Vandenberg Air Force Base as well as cruise missiles being tested near Point Mugu. It experienced numerous trips to the beautiful Channel Islands. It experienced long, torturous trips in horrible weather, like the trip to release weather balloons 80 miles (130 km) offshore for the Navy or the night it took two hours to travel from San Onofre to Dana Point Harbor in 50 knots (93 km/h; 58 mph) head winds and six foot wind swell. There were the times when amazing animals were collected; hyperiid amphipods in the midwater trawl and Tilapia, a freshwater fish, caught miles offshore several days after a storm.

== Fate ==
Occidental College decided to cease operating the vessel in 2002. The vessel was taken by California State University, Long Beach who operated the vessel for a few years. CSULB sold the boat in 2008 to private individuals in San Diego who have interests in the sport fishing industry. The Vantuna continues in its service as a private yachtfisher with San Diego Bay, Shelter Island as its home port.
