= Jon Lien =

Canadian conservationist

Jon Lien CM ONL
- Born: Ordin Jon Lien; 19 March 1939; Clark, South Dakota, United States of America
- Died: 14 April 2010 (aged 71); St. John's, Newfoundland, Canada
- Spouse: Judy Traastad (m. 1962)
- Children: Maren Hinlopen; O.J. Lien; Elling Lien
- Parents: Ordin Lien; Alvera Lien

Academic background
- Education: St. Olaf College, Washington State University
- Thesis: Some relations between suckling stereotypy, exploratory behavior, and discrimination reversals in swine (1967)

Academic work
- Institutions: Memorial University of Newfoundland

Ordin Jon Lien CM ONL (19 March 1939 – 14 April 2010), nicknamed “the Whale Man”, was a Canadian conservationist, researcher, professor, and organic farmer who founded Memorial University of Newfoundland’s Whale Research Group. From the late 1970s to the early 2000s, Lien released whales and other cetaceans entrapped in fishing nets along the coast of Newfoundland, and innovated now-widely-used whale rescue techniques. He invented the Lien Pinger, an acoustic alarm which is attached to fishing nets to reduce whale entrapments.

== Biography ==
=== Early life and education ===
Jon Lien was born in Clark, South Dakota on 19 March 1939. His parents were Ordin and Alvera Lien. He was around animals from a young age between fishing, working on his uncle’s farm, and raising chickens in his parents’ garage.

Lien moved to Northfield, Minnesota in 1957 to pursue arts and literature at St. Olaf College. During his time at St. Olaf, he worked for the Wilderness Canoe Base. He also met his future wife Judy Traastad.

In 1962, Jon married Judy after graduating from St. Olaf, and they moved to Pullman, Washington where he initially pursued a doctorate in clinical psychology at Washington State University. However, the study of animal behaviour captured his interest and he reoriented his studies to complete his doctorate with a specialization in animal behaviour.

=== Move to Newfoundland ===
Jon and Judy moved to Newfoundland in 1968, where Jon accepted a position at Memorial University of Newfoundland. He and Judy bought a six-acre lot of land in Portugal Cove St. Philips and hand-built their house with recycled wood from an old warehouse in downtown St. Johns and the office of the inoperative Bell Island mine. It is here that they also started their organic farm.

At MUN, he taught animal behaviour, ocean studies and psychology, and was originally researching seabirds around the coast of Newfoundland with his students. He confirmed the presence of the first North American colony of Manx Shearwaters on Middle Lawn Island, Newfoundland.

=== Whale Research Group ===
In the late 1970s, Lien received a call about a group of whales trapped in ice in Halls Bay, Newfoundland. He travelled there and set up a tent on his zodiac and stayed there studying the whales until the coast guard broke enough ice for the whales to swim clear.

After this experience, Lien founded Memorial University of Newfoundland's Whale Research Group, with the goals of releasing whales and large marine animals entangled in fishermen's nets around the coast of Newfoundland, so that the animals are returned to safety and the fisherman can continue fishing. The Whale Research Group was committed to marine environment conservation and education, responding to up to 150 entrapped humpback whales in one year.

Over his career, Lien is credited with saving over 500 marine animals, publishing 7 books and guides, over 300 research papers on whales, seabirds, fishing by-catch, turtles, and more, and many more educational articles. He also invented various underwater alarm systems to warn whales and other aquatic animals about nearby fishing nets, using a hammer and anvil mechanism to create a pinging noise at a frequency which the marine mammals can hear but the fish cannot.

The Whale Research Group is now known as the Whale Release and Strandings Group, and is still active today, led by Julie Huntington and Wayne Ledwell.

=== Lien Family Farm ===
When building their house in Portugal Cove, Jon and Judy also started building a garden. Over time, a barn, paddock, root cellar, tractor shed, and a two-storey chill building were added. They raised goats, chickens, turkeys, and pigs, and produced over fifty different crops, always trying to incorporate new ones.

It was common for students, interns, and visitors to live on the farm. Some would be there for whales and others would be there for the farming, so a cabin was built on the farm as a place for these people to live.

The farm was one of the first in Newfoundland to achieve organic certification status. In 2011, Jon (posthumously) and Judy were presented with the Gerritt Loo Award honouring outstanding contribution to the organic farming community. The farm is still operational today.

=== Death ===
Lien's health gradually declined after a truck accident in 2002, and he was hospitalized in 2007, requiring full time nursing care. He died of heart complications on 14 April 2010.

== Honours ==
=== Awards ===
- Order of Canada
- Order of Newfoundland and Labrador
- 125th Anniversary of the Confederation of Canada Commemorative Medal
- Lifetime Achievement Award from the Newfoundland and Labrador Department of Environment and Conservation
- Keyes Award for Research and Conservation
- Department of Fisheries and Oceans’ Deputy Minister's Award
- World Environment Day Award
- Honorary Doctorate of Science from St. Olaf College

=== The Dr. Jon Lien Memorial Scholarship ===
Memorial University of Newfoundland's Dr. Jon Lien Memorial Scholarship was created to honour Lien and is awarded to a full time graduate student studying marine animal behaviour, marine conservation, coastal community revitalization, or a current fishery challenge.

== See also ==
- Whale entanglement
