= Earthtrust =

Environmental organization

- Formation: 1976; 50 years ago
- Founder: Don White
- Founded at: Hawai'i
- Type: Non-governmental organization
- Tax ID no.: 99-0172970
- Legal status: 501(c)(3)
- Headquarters: Kailua, Hawai'i
- Location: United States
- Website: https://earthtrust.org/
- Formerly called: Save the Whales Hawai'i

Earthtrust (ET) is a non-governmental environmental organization based on the island of Oahu in Hawaii. Earthtrust was founded by in 1976 by Don White, a founding member and former international campaign director of Greenpeace International who has directed the organization since its inception. Focusing mostly on marine conservation, Earthtrust is responsible for the largest conservation victory in history by biomass due to its critical role in exposing, documenting, and ending large-scale high seas driftnetting. Earthtrust has been involved in many high-profile advocacy actions; notably the pioneering use of genetic analysis to demonstrate the prevalence of pirate whaling, the first scientific demonstration of self-awareness in a non-primate at its Delphis lab, creation of the first international seafood environmental accreditation standard (Flipper Seal of Approval), binding the world's largest tuna firm (StarKist) contractually to its tuna-acquisition criteria, and being the first to take charge of the environmental disaster left by the retreating Iraqi army in the Gulf War. The organization was designed to have a high funding efficiency and effectiveness, showcasing the methodologies of "effectivism" and "system steering" as alternatives to standard activism, by preferentially taking on what would otherwise be considered "impossible missions".

Earthtrust long served as an official observer at the International Whaling Commission. It also was one of the eight founding organizations of the Species Survival Network.

== Notable Campaigns ==
=== Driftnet Campaign ===
Picking up the pieces of the pelagic driftnet campaign Don White had created under Greenpeace International in 1983–1985, Earthtrust created an intricate plan to ban this destructive technology in the world's largest fishery. Launching a 40' sailboat into the North Pacific in 1988, it succeeded in getting the first ever documentation of actively fishing driftnet vessels of a huge three-nation fleet – at that time unknown to the world at large. It then produced the video "Stripmining the Seas" and used it, along with Earthtrust's briefing document of worldwide driftnet impacts, to catalyze a fast-growing movement among fishing nations, and secondarily among conservationists. Attacked by Japan's Fisheries Organization, the organization followed up with the video "Closing the Curtains of Death", working with a number of nations – notably including Geoffrey Palmer, PM of New Zealand – to press for regional bans and a global ban. In 1989, it was requested by Greenpeace NZ director Mike Hagler that Earthtrust do a Tasman Sea at-sea expedition to help keep momentum on South Pacific ban initiatives. The campaign culminated in 1991 at the United Nations, where Earthtrust was challenged directly by Japan- which had created its own video productions and briefing documents. Ultimately, in a rare unanimous UN vote, pelagic driftnets were withdrawn as a fishing methodology, saving huge amounts of living biomass.

Dr. Noel Brown, Director of the United Nations Environment Program, declared in 1992:

As the Regional Director of a Programme which is directly concerned with the productive capacity and environmental sustainability of the oceans, I have observed the progress of the Driftnet issue; which was brought to international prominence by Earthtrust's expeditions, research documents, and video productions of 1988-89. Despite its comparatively small size as an international organization, Earthtrust maintained credible pressure on the issue in the face of intense lobbying by driftnetting nations; building a network of concerned individuals, businesses, legislators, and others. The UN Driftnet resolution of 1989, the follow-up resolution of 1990, and the final defining resolution in November 1991 are results of Earthtrust bringing this issue before the international community; an inspirational victory showing the power of good research and effective presentation.

Flipper Seal of Approval

=== Tuna/dolphin Campaign ===
The so-called "tuna/dolphin" problem was the killing of millions of dolphins in the Eastern Tropical Pacific by a fishing method developed in the late 1950s by US fishermen. Based on a behavioral quirk of adult yellowfin tuna, dolphins could be intentionally netted to capture tuna which were often underneath them; but the dolphins suffered high morbidity and mortality, with populations dropping fast. When some initial dolphin protections were legislated in the US in 1972, US vessels went to foreign registry and continued the practice, or stayed in US registry and threatened the appointed "porpoise mortality" observers into silence (such as Earthtrust's Dr. Ken Marten, who would go on to direct Project Delphis). The issue changed abruptly in 1987 with Sam LaBudde's undercover expose, but despite its renewed high-profile the sides were deadlocked. Don White of Earthtrust created a plan to end this deadlock and presented it to Tony O'Reilly, CEO of HJ Heinz, StarKist's parent firm. This plan was based around the Earthtrust-owned accreditation mark "Flipper Seal of Approval", which as a trademarked international symbol could not be copied by tuna firms which were still killing dolphins. After months of meetings between White and Starkist executives, the firm agreed to contractually adopt Earthtrust's tuna-acquisition standards worldwide, which was announced at a NY press conference in 1991 between White and Keith Haugy, then-president of StarKist. This finally enabled a clear distinction between those firms selling 'dolphin deadly' tuna versus 'dolphin friendly'. This caused other major firms to adopt similar criteria, such as those of Earth Island Institute, which subsequently co-founded Flipper Foundation with Earthtrust as a mechanism to use fisheries royalties to reduce bycatch to zero via successive contract iterations, and innovations such as robot observers. StarKist remained under contract to Earthtrust for its global tuna acquisition for seven years, during which the global marketing of dolphin-deadly tuna flagged. This campaign was widely considered impossible by experts until the Earthtrust/Starkist contract was announced.

=== Penghu Dolphin Drive Kills ===
In the spring of 1990, alerted by its "eco eye" network of local videographers, Earthtrust campaigners from Hawaii, California, New Zealand, and Taiwan traveled to the island of Penghu, Taiwan, to document the capture and slaughter of migrating dolphins. The kill was stopped and many of the captured dolphins were released after Earthtrust recruited the support of educational, religious, and political leaders in negotiating with the local fishermen, and quickly achieved a resolution ending dolphin drive kills in Taiwan's executive Yuan. This was the last drive kill to ever take place in Taiwan; due to the broad support generated by the campaign, the Taiwan Council of Agriculture added dolphins to the list of protected species covered by their Wildlife Protection Law. It stands as the only long-running national drive-kill of dolphins which was brought to an end through a conservationist initiative. This was due to the campaign's many structural differences from standard activism approaches to drive kills, and had many similarities to the Kuwait oil fires campaign.

=== Kuwait Oil Fires and Wildlife Campaign ===
Featured on the cover of National Geographic magazine, Earthtrust was the first environmental organization to enter Kuwait after the 1991 Gulf War to assess the environmental damage caused by the burning oil fields of Kuwait. The first on the scene while missiles were still falling, Earthtrust campaign staff quickly took charge; shutting off pipelines gushing into the ocean, deploying oil barriers to protect wetlands, escorting international media from Bahrain into still-burning Kuwait, and taking political action within Kuwait resulting in dramatically expediting the process of the fires being extinguished, saving an estimated 2 billion barrels of crude oil from burning freely and polluting the environment. This was memorialized in the internationally broadcast Earthtrust documentary Hell on Earth. Notably, Earthtrust used the same teams and strategic toolkit which had previously conducted primarily dolphin and fisheries campaigns, demonstrating that the organization's unusual methods were flexible enough for drastically different situations.

=== 1977 Pacific Whaling Campaign ===
Earthtrust located and purchased the anti-whaling movement's first fully owned campaign vessel, which was also the Greenpeace movement's first (non-chartered) ship. This ship, the Ohana Kai, was purchased via a fundraising drive by the newly incorporated Earthtrust (originally named Save the Whales - Hawaii). The ship was then outfitted for the 1977 campaign against Soviet whaling as a joint venture between the organizations. The vessel, a former U.S. Navy WWII submarine chaser vessel, was 176 feet long, fitted with a helicopter pad, and had one organization featured on each side; one side was Greenpeace, the other STWH. The ship confronted the Dalniy Vostok whaling fleet and boarded it, with an ABC film crew along to document it. The Ohana Kai ended the campaign season in San Francisco, where it remained as a floating museum for years.

=== Saving Whales with DNA ===
Anecdotal evidence of the widespread availability of "protected species" whalemeat in the Japanese marketplace had been known for many years. Earthtrust pioneered the use of a "suitcase PCR lab", sending scientists Steve Palumbi and Scott Baker into the field to test meat fresh from the markets. This involved undercover meat buys within Japan by professional agents maintaining a tight chain of custody and video documentation. The sample DNA was cloned on site for export and analysis using PCR (polymerase chain reaction) to not run afoul of CITES rules. The data indicated the widespread availability of meat from many types of "protected" whale, including humpback and fin whales, as well as many samples of dolphin meat falsely sold as "whale". The results were published in Science in 1994.

The scientific conclusions shocked the world and let to permanent changes in the way the IWC and other conservation bodies looked at policing infractions; it also severely undermined Japan's rationale for continued lethal "research whaling" by demonstrating that only a tiny amount of tissue was needed to generate huge amounts of data. Earthtrust continued the project for several years, leading to a proliferation of labs, NGOs and nations adopting its protocols.

"I am convinced of the efficiency of [this] technique, using the DNA to fight the illegal trade of whale meat, and I hope it will be successfully used. We must seize every opportunity to defend these majestic creatures, vital to the diversity of our water planet." - Jacques-Yves Cousteau

=== Endangered Wildlife Initiatives ===
Earthtrust initiated its first land-based program in 1989, focusing on the need to preserve and protect tigers. As an outgrowth of the process of gathering information, establishing Asian contacts and building a worldwide network for tiger protection, Earthtrust's concerns expanded to include other species endangered by illegal trade and vanishing habitats.

==== Rhino Campaign ====
Keith Highley and Suzie Chang Highley, the managers of Earthtrust's field office in Taiwan, created an awareness and education campaign in cooperation with Taiwanese businesses to inform the public about the threat to African and Asian rhinoceros species resulting from the popularity of rhino horn-based medicinals.

==== Tiger Campaign ====
An extensive market survey of tiger parts in Taiwan was completed in March 1993. Earthtrust efforts included providing information and documentation to Washington DC State Department and USFWS officials, regarding Taiwan's promises to take concrete steps to shut down the trade in rhino horn and tiger parts. They also developed a five-point Action Plan for Taiwan, emphasizing effective law enforcement and education as necessary steps toward ending the consumption of tiger parts.

==== Bear Campaign ====
Earthtrust, in conjunction with the Humane Society of the United States, has done extensive field work to document the trade in bear parts, particularly bear gall bladders and bear paws, which are parts of the Chinese medicine and the "exotic gourmet" trend in East Asia, respectively.

== Programs ==
=== Project Delphis ===
Project Delphis was started in 1985 at Bateson's Bay on the grounds of Sea Life Park Hawaii. Don White and Dexter Cate envisioned a lab with research conducted without training or reward, with the dolphins in full control of the situation, and with the goals entirely directed at scientific questions which could have a positive bearing on dolphin survival in a human-dominated world. The initial iteration involved a custom sound-recognition system designed by computer scientist John McAfee and established that dolphins would spontaneously interact with computers and video screens. The lab underwent a shift in 1990 after Cate's accidental death.

Designed and directed by White and implemented by Dr. Ken Marten and Suchi Psarokos, the new version of Delphis began to operate a lab in 1990 focusing on dolphin cognition research, with the hope that scientific evidence of dolphin intelligence would motivate humans to respect and protect them. It conducted the first research suggesting that dolphins are self aware beings, the first non-primates recognized to meet this cognitive benchmark. The lab was the first to observe dolphins artistically creating air-core vortex bubble rings, and used underwater touchscreen televisions and a word-recognition sonic interface to allow dolphins to interact with computer programs. The lab was featured in hundreds of documentaries around the world, and featured dolphins interacting with computers via touchscreen and sonic inputs, learning high-frequency "words" which the computers and dolphins could utilize, and interacting with humans. A plan to allow dolphins to computer-interact with Japanese schoolchildren in real time over the internet was in progress when Sea Life Park changed ownership and the lab was closed in 2003 after nearly 18 years of operation.

=== DriftNetwork ===
Earthtrust's DriftNetwork program was a follow-up of the successful driftnet campaign. For years, the nation of Taiwan sent its enforcement ships to Honolulu to be inspected by Earthtrust at the beginning of each driftnet season, and an international network of contacts coordinated by Sharon White reported on any sightings of covert driftnet vessels still in operation. The program was endorsed by UNEP as the main line of defense in maintaining the driftnet ban. Initially, it helped shape public opinion against the practice, labeling driftnetting as "strip-mining the seas" and calling the nets "walls of death." The effort following the ban by the United Nations has been directed towards stopping pirate driftnetting in order to protect the marine ecosystem. Driftnetting has been associated with reduction in marine species including dolphins that are not the targets of fishing. The Driftnet Campaign and DriftNetwork program has secured the survival of myriad species, fish populations, and a number of creatures.

=== Whale Watching Industry Naturalist Program ===
The Whale Watching Industry Naturalist Program was run from 1987 to 1994 as an educational awareness program. It gave over 180,000 tourists access to information regarding marine species while setting a higher standard to assure that whales were not harassed by the vessels, which had been rampant prior to Earthtrust's entry.

== See also ==
- CITES
- Drift netting
- Greenpeace
- Sea Shepherd Conservation Society
- Species Survival Network
