= Anti-trawling device =

Kind of artificial reef

Anti-trawling devices are a specific kind of artificial reef. Trawling is a controversial fishing practice which has attracted environmental, legal, and political objections. Anti-trawling devices have been invented, manufactured, and deployed to damage trawlers' nets and thus slow them down, force them to stop operating, or force them elsewhere. They are usually large concrete blocks with metal hooks or blades embedded in their tops. Anti-trawling devices are being used by environmental groups, fishermen, and sometimes even by governments.

As with artificial reefs in general, the actual effectiveness of anti-trawling reefs is understudied. An Australian Government analysis anticipates very high costs and difficulty if they are removed. If they are removed, however, they expect:

- Increased fish abundance rather than decreased, because typically fishing increases around such devices to greater degree than the actual biological productivity does;
- Return and resurgence of finfish and other mobile organisms;
- Stabilization of prey numbers due to restored ecological balance due to the return of larger predators;
- Return of predators preventing "spill over" of predators and grazers into other areas;
- Restoration of appropriate movement and migration patterns.

They recommend changing permitting processes to account for the cost, and for whether removal is even feasible.
