= Trawling =

Method of catching fish

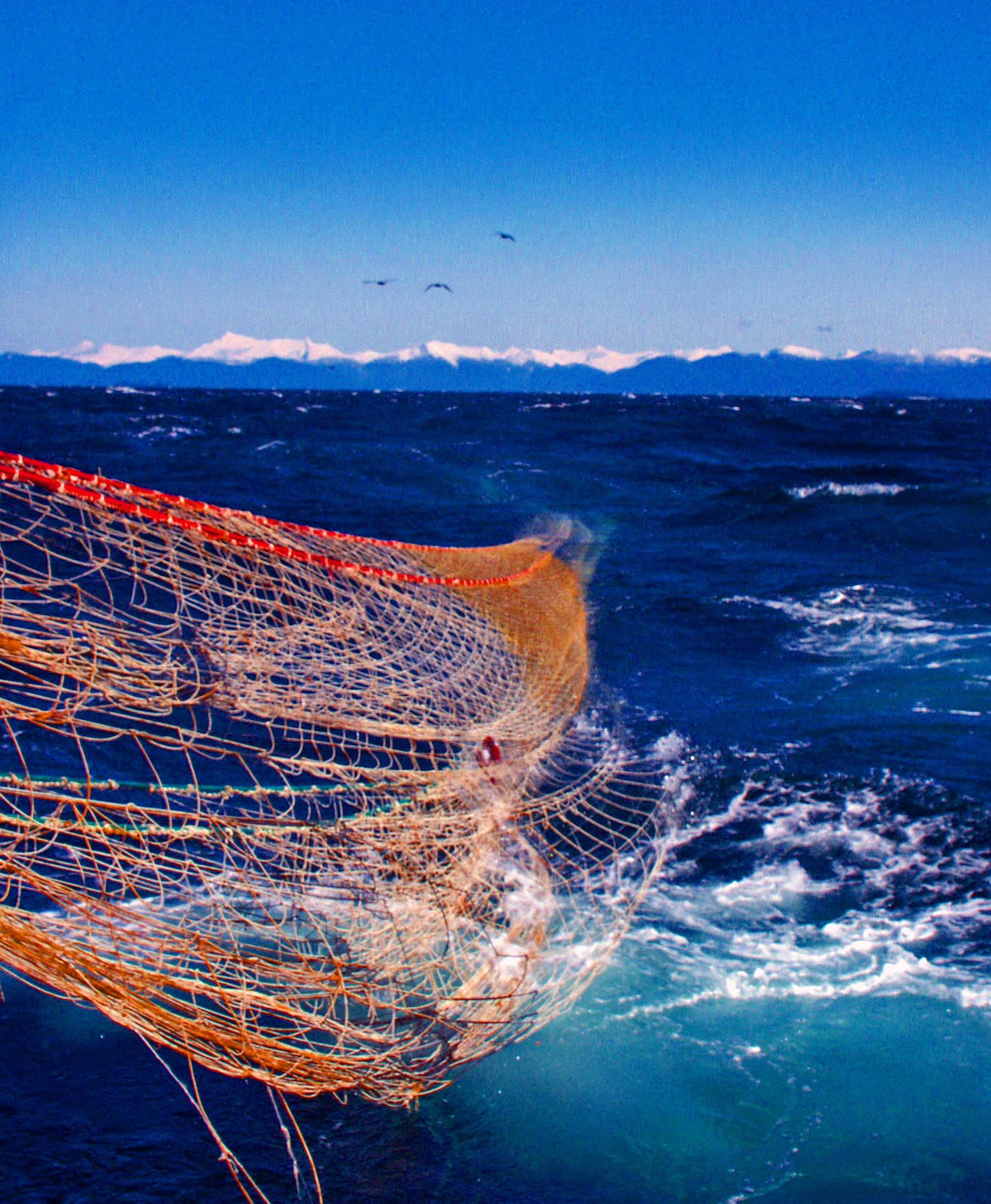
Setting a trawl in Stephens Passage in southeast Alaska

Trawling is an industrial method of fishing that involves pulling a fishing net through the water behind one or more boats. The net used for trawling is called a trawl. This principle requires netting bags which are towed through water to catch different species of fishes or sometimes targeted species. Trawls are often called towed gear or dragged gear.

The boats that are used for trawling are called trawlers or draggers. Trawlers vary in size from small open boats with as little as 30 hp (22 kW) engines to large factory trawlers with over 10,000 hp (7.5 MW). Trawling can be carried out by one trawler or by two trawlers fishing cooperatively (pair trawling).

Trawling can be contrasted with trolling. While trawling involves a net and is typically done for commercial usage, trolling instead involves a reel, rod and a bait or a lure and is typically done for recreational purposes. Trawling is also commonly used as a scientific sampling, or survey, method.

== Types ==
Trawling can be divided into bottom trawling and midwater trawling, depending on how high the trawl (net) is in the water column.

=== Bottom trawling ===
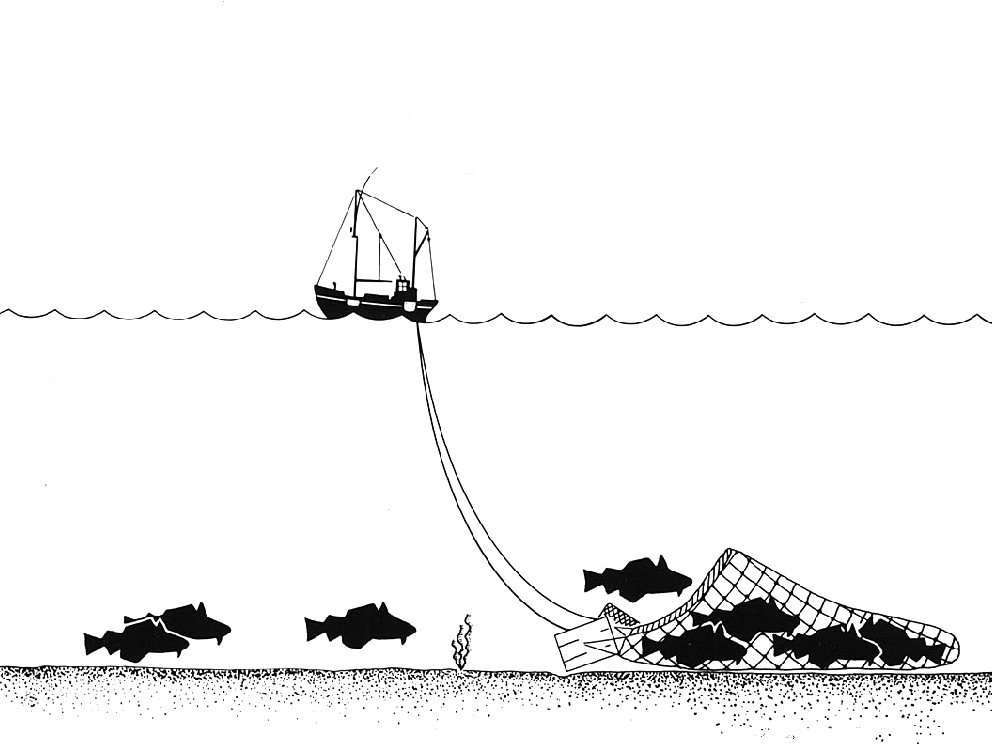
Illustration of bottom trawling

Bottom trawling is towing the trawl along (benthic trawling) or close to (demersal trawling) the sea floor. Bottom trawling is an industrial fishing method in which a large net with heavy weights is dragged across the seafloor, scooping up everything in its path. Bottom trawling can be disadvantageous because it can stir up significant amounts of sediments that lie on the sea bed and can harm some marine species. It also causes water pollutants to mix with some plankton, which in turn will move into the food chain, which will then create harmful algae blooms leading to insufficient oxygen.

A 2021 study estimated that greenhouse gas emissions from bottom trawling were as much as aviation. However, the estimation methods in the original article published in the journal Nature, have been criticized by other scientists, claiming that the greenhouse gas emission estimates are uncertain. Newer, trial methods employing bottom trawling gear that do not touch the seabed could potentially have lower environmental impact than livestock or fed aquaculture if employed.

=== Midwater trawling ===
Midwater trawling or pelagic trawling target fishes that live in the upper water column of the ocean. The funnel shaped trawl nets are hauled by one or two boats. This method is generally used to catch fishes of a single species. Unlike bottom trawling, this type of trawl does not come into contact with the sea bed and hence is not involved in damage of marine habitats. Some species caught with this trawling method are mackerel, herring and hoki. However, there may be some disadvantages in using this method as in the process of catching the targeted species of fish, non targeted fish species are also captured accidentally and thus discarding of these species impacts their populations. Still, bycatch level is typically lower.

Midwater trawling is also known as pelagic trawling as it targets pelagic fish, whereas bottom trawling targets both bottom-living fish (groundfish) and semi-pelagic fish. The gear itself can vary a great deal. Pelagic trawls are typically much larger than bottom trawls, with very large mesh openings in the net, little or no ground gear, and little or no chafing gear. Additionally, pelagic trawl doors have different shapes than bottom trawl doors, although doors that can be used with both nets do exist.

== Net structure ==
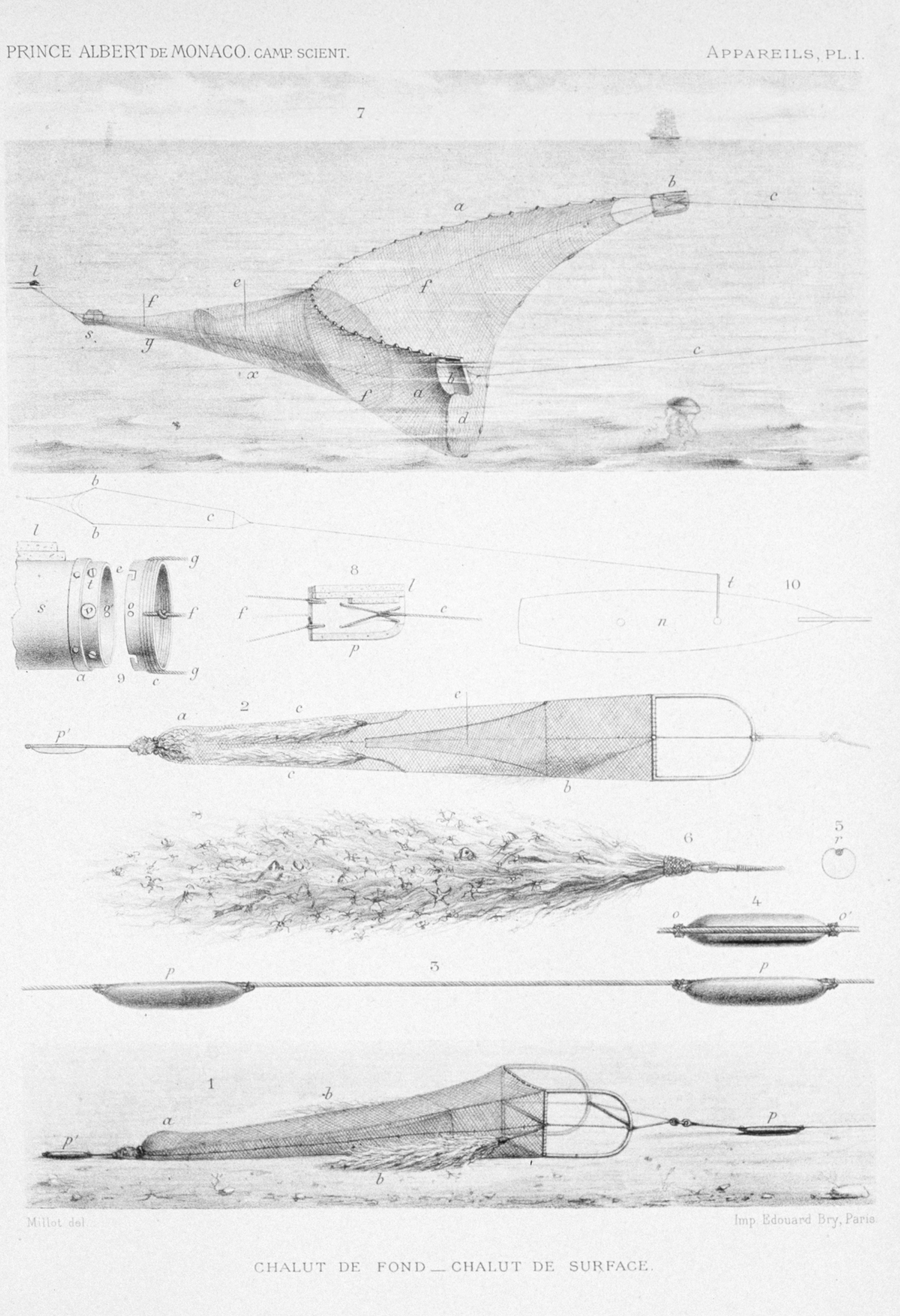
Nets for trawling in surface waters and for trawling in deep water and over the bottom. Note the "tangles" with ensnared marine life

When two boats are used (pair trawling), the horizontal spread of the net is provided by the boats, with one or in the case of pelagic trawling two warps attached to each boat. However, single-boat trawling is more common. Here, the horizontal spread of the net is provided by trawl doors (also known as "otter boards"). Trawl doors are available in various sizes and shapes and may be specialized to keep in contact with the sea bottom (bottom trawling) or to remain elevated in the water. In all cases, doors essentially act as wings, using a hydrodynamic shape to provide horizontal spread. As with all wings, the towing vessel must go at a certain speed for the doors to remain standing and functional. This speed varies, but is generally in the range of 2.5–4.0 knots.

The vertical opening of a trawl net is created using flotation on the upper edge ("floatline") and weight on the lower edge ("footrope") of the net mouth. The configuration of the footrope varies based on the expected bottom shape. The more uneven the bottom, the more robust the footrope configuration must be to prevent net damage. This is used to catch shrimp, shellfish, cod, scallops and many others. Trawls are funnel-shaped nets that have a closed-off tail where the fish are collected and is open on the top end as the mouth.

Trawl nets can also be modified, such as changing mesh size, to help with marine research of ocean bottoms.

== Environmental effects ==
Although trawling today is heavily regulated in some nations, it remains the target of many protests by environmentalists. Environmental concerns related to trawling refer to two areas: the lack of selectivity and the physical damage which the trawl does to the seabed.

=== Selectivity ===
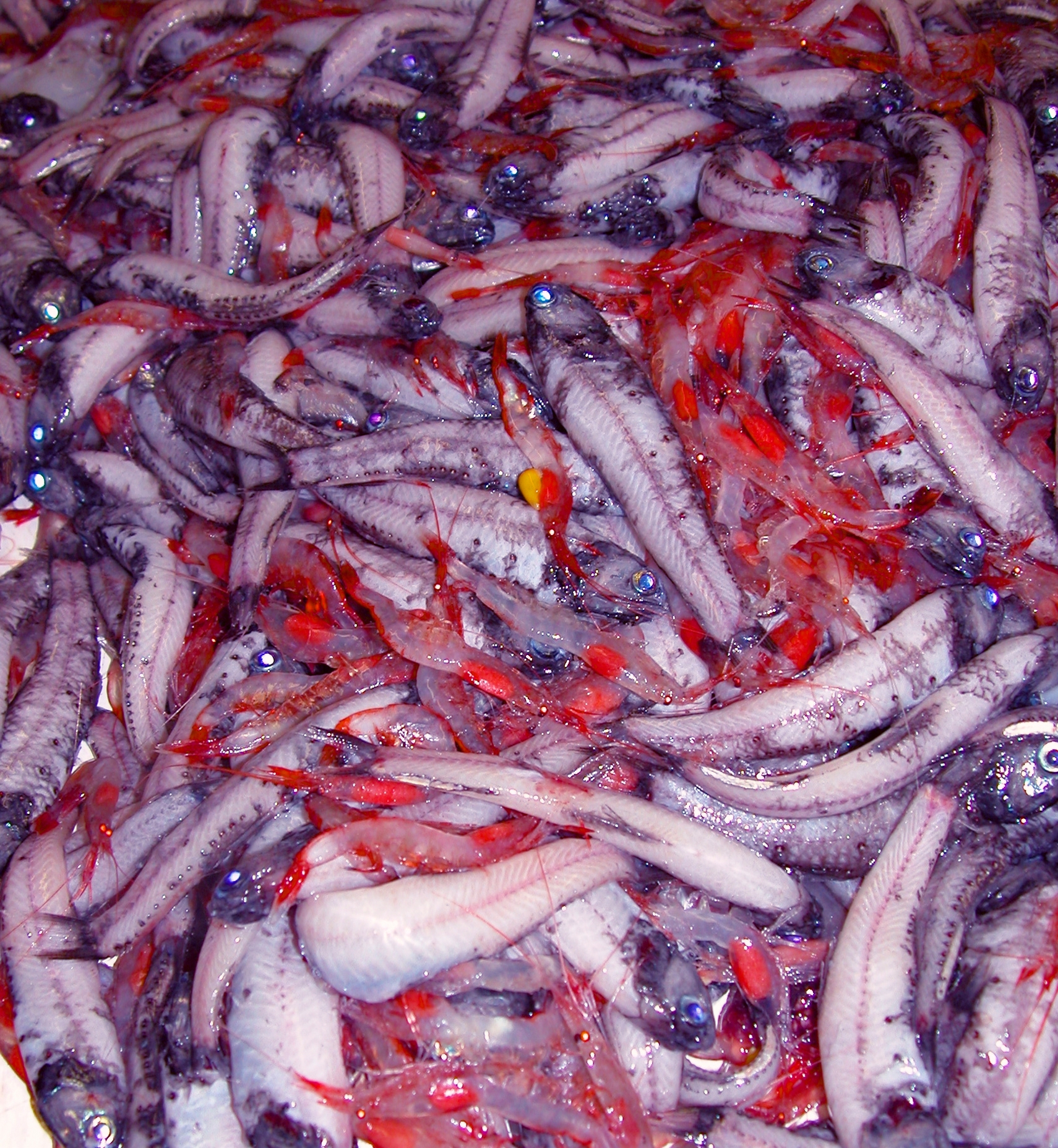
Trawl catch of myctophids and glass shrimp from the bottom at greater than 200 m (660 ft) depth

Since the practice of trawling started (c. 14th century), there have been concerns over trawling's lack of selectivity. Trawls may be non-selective, sweeping both marketable and undesirable fish and fish of both legal and illegal size. Any part of the catch which cannot be used is considered by-catch, some of which is killed accidentally by the trawling process. By-catch commonly includes valued species such as dolphins, sea turtles, and sharks, and may also include sublegal or immature individuals of the targeted species.

Many studies have documented large volumes of by-catch that are discarded. For example, researchers conducting a three-year study in the Clarence River found that an estimated 177 tons of by-catch (including 77 different species) were discarded each year.

Size selectivity is controlled by the mesh size of the "cod-end" — the part of the trawl where fish are retained. Fishermen complain that mesh sizes which allow undersized fish to escape also allow some legally catchable fish to escape. There are a number of "fixes", such as tying a rope around the "cod-end" to prevent the mesh from opening fully, which have been developed to work around technical regulation of size selectivity. One problem is when the mesh gets pulled into narrow diamond shapes (rhombuses) instead of squares.

The capture of undesirable species is a recognized problem with all fishing methods and unites environmentalists, who do not want to see fish killed needlessly, and fishermen, who do not want to waste their time sorting marketable fish from their catch. A number of methods to minimize this have been developed for use in trawling. By-catch reduction grids (typically made of stainless steel or plastic) or square mesh panels of net can be fitted to parts of the trawl, allowing certain species to escape while retaining others. In fish trawls, the grid is mounted so the smallest organisms (juvenile fish, shrimp) pass through the grid and enter the sea again. In shrimp trawls, the grid pushes the largest organisms (fish) through a hole in the roof of the net, reducing by-catch of fish. The latter type of grid is mandatory in Norway and has been in use for 20 years. The grids are typically equipped with sensors that measure the angle of the grid, so the fishermen can tell whether the grid is working correctly.

Studies have suggested that shrimp trawling is responsible for the highest rate of by-catch.

=== Physical damage ===
Trawling is controversial because of its environmental impacts. Because bottom trawling involves towing heavy fishing gear over the seabed, it can cause large-scale destruction on the ocean bottom, including coral shattering, damage to habitats and removal of seaweed.

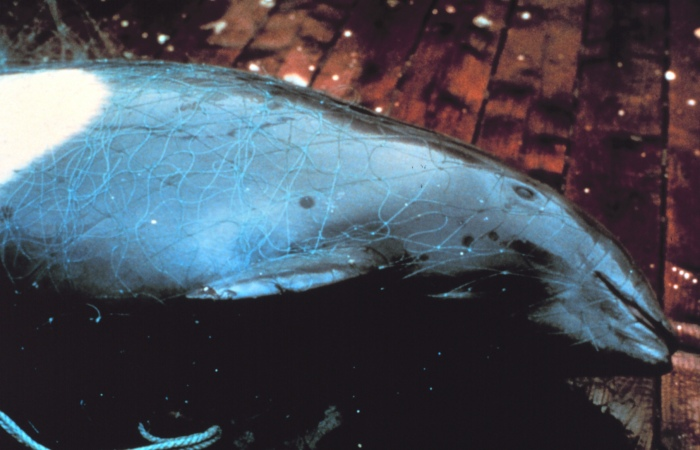
Porpoise Caught in Fishing Net

The primary sources of impact are the doors, which can weigh several tonnes and create furrows if dragged along the bottom, and the footrope configuration, which usually remains in contact with the bottom across the entire lower edge of the net. Depending on the configuration, the footrope may turn over large rocks or boulders, possibly dragging them along with the net, disturb or damage sessile organisms or rework and re-suspend bottom sediments. These impacts result in decreases in species diversity and ecological changes towards more opportunistic organisms. The destruction has been likened to clear-cutting in forests.

The primary dispute over trawling concerns the magnitude and duration of these impacts. Opponents argue that they are widespread, intense and long-lasting. Defenders maintain that impact is mostly limited and of low intensity compared to natural events. However, most areas with significant natural sea bottom disturbance events are in relatively shallow water. In mid to deep waters, bottoms trawlers are the only significant area-wide events.

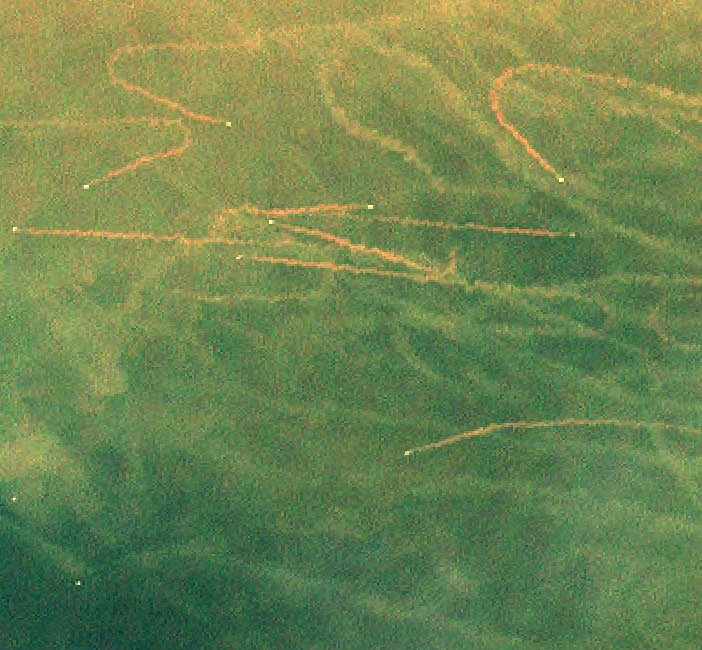
Aerial Photo of Trawling Turbidity Plume in Louisiana

Bottom trawling on soft bottoms stirs up bottom sediments, loading suspended solids into the water column. It is estimated that 21.87 gigatons of sediment from the sea floor is resuspended annually due solely to the activity of trawlers. For scale, the amount of sediment deposited into the ocean by all rivers in the world is estimated to be 17.8 to 20 gigatons annually. (Note: These turbidity plumes can be seen on Google Earth high resolution offshore photos. See bottom trawling.) When the turbidity plumes from bottom trawlers are below a thermocline, the surface may not be impacted, but less visible impacts can still occur, such as persistent organic pollutant transfer into the pelagic food chain. Rototilling the sea floor and resuspending bottom sediment affects the nutrient levels and changes the entire chemistry of the ambient water, greatly reducing the photosynthesizing ability of plants and kelps while also impacting any animal living on the ocean floor. An article published in New Zealand Journal of Marine and Freshwater Research determined that the resuspended sediment creates anaerobic turbid conditions capable of killing scallop larvae that use the ocean floor as a habitat as they mature. The study also revealed that for filter feeders, despite there being more particulate matter in the water after a trawl, the protein per unit weight of sediment decreased, meaning they have to filter much more water for the same nutritional value. A 2021 study estimated annual carbon emissions from bottom trawling at almost 1.5 billion tonnes (about 3% of the world total) and recommended that more marine protected areas be established. Both the findings and the conclusions in the study have been scrutinized in more recent scientific works that do not come to the same conclusions as the mentioned study does.

Despite these scientific disputes that to a large extent are oriented around scientific modelling, other effects of trawling are not disputed. A vast array of species are threatened by trawling around the world. In particular, trawling can directly kill coral reefs by breaking them up and burying them in sediments. In addition, trawling can kill corals indirectly by wounding coral tissue, leaving the reefs vulnerable to infection. The net effect of fishing practices on global coral reef populations is suggested by many scientists to be alarmingly high. Published research has shown that benthic trawling destroys the cold-water coral Lophelia pertusa, an important habitat for many deep-sea organisms.

Midwater (pelagic) trawling is a much "cleaner" method of fishing, in that the catch usually consists of just one species and does not physically damage the sea bottom. However, environmental groups have raised concerns that this fishing practice may be responsible for significant volumes of by-catch, particularly cetaceans (dolphins, porpoises, and whales).

== Studies on population and trawling ==
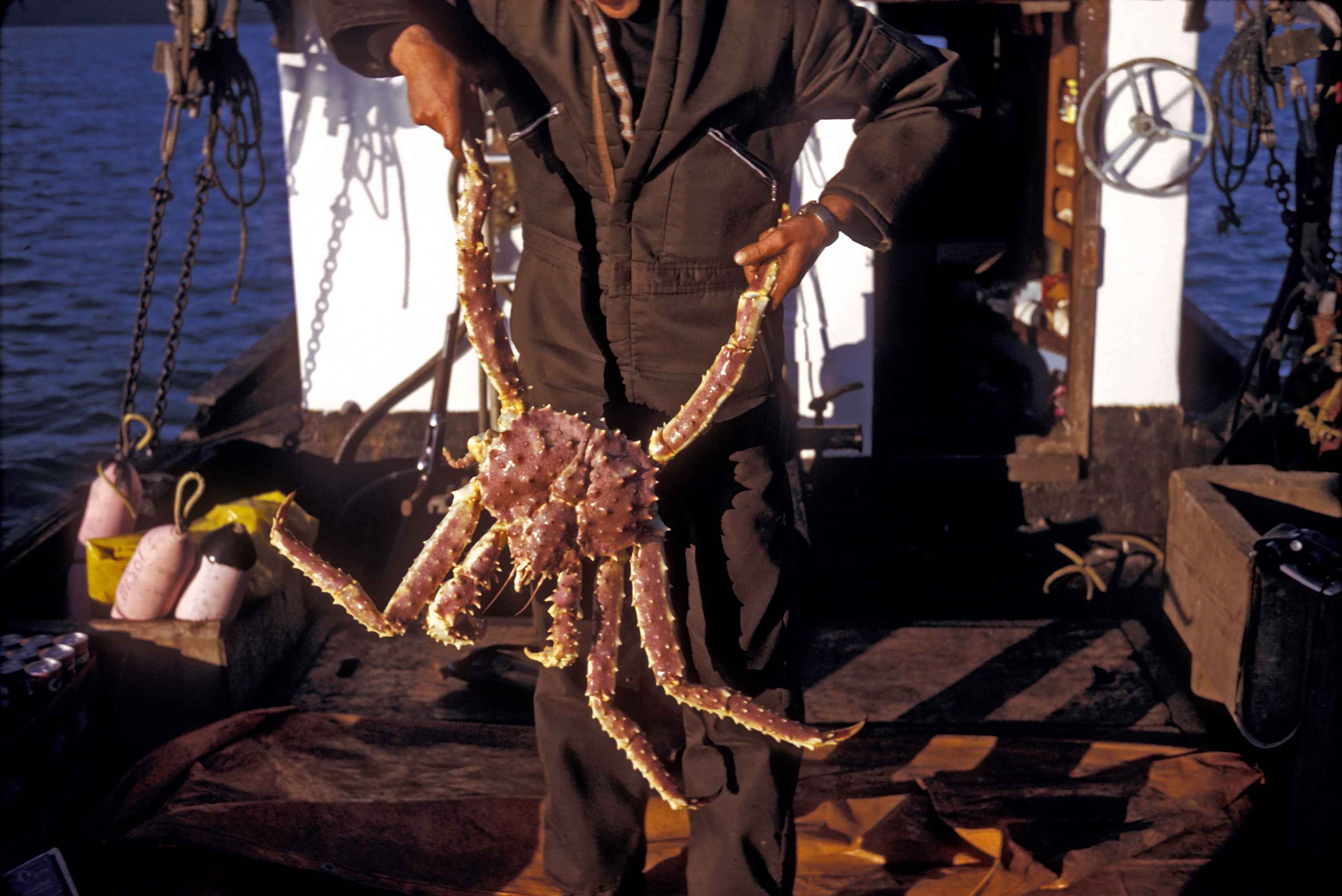
Red King Crab

The population of Alaska's Bristol Bay red king crab experienced an abrupt collapse during a three-year time span after 1980. During the 1970s the Bristol Bay red king crab fishery represented Alaska's most valuable single-species fishery until 1980, then in 1982 the catch had dropped to zero and was an incredible example of a population crash. The cause of this crash was controversial with U.S. and Alaskan crab managers and modelers, with some stating the phenomena was a natural occurrence due to Pacific decadal oscillation, a shift in the location of warm and cold waters at an irregular pattern, while other marine biologists questioned the involvement of the new trawling fishery targeting Yellowfin sole in the area. Subsequently, a study was conducted by C. Braxton Dew and Robert A. McConnaughey in 2005 using data from the yearly Bristol Bay bottom-trawl survey conducted by the National Marine Fisheries Service and from the North Pacific fishery-observer database (NORPAC), to determine the effect of trawling on the population collapse.

When the U.S. commercial harvest of the legal male red king crab reached its peak in 1980 after a 10-year increase, a trawl fishery for Yellowfin sole was introduced. The new trawl fishery was located in the same area as the Bristol Bay Pot Sanctuary, which was dissolved in 1976. The pot sanctuary was introduced to protect the brood stock of female king crab which congregate in Bristol Bay to lay their fertilized eggs. During the active years of the pot sanctuary the only catch allowed in the area was male red king crab of regulation size caught in crab pots. During the first year of the joint U.S.-Soviet Yellowfin sole fishery, 1980, the bycatch rates for red king crab in the Bering Sea and Aleutian Islands increased by 371% over the average rates from 1977-1979. The following year, in 1981, the bycatch rate increased again another 235% over the 1980 rate, with most of the bycatch being mature females. As more unmonitored domestic trawls, trawls where bycatch is not reported, began in the area that was formerly the sanctuary, anecdotal reports of "red bags," trawl bags with the cod-end, the end the fish are retained, plugged with red king crab began. During this time the percentage of males in the population jumped from 25% in 1981 and 16% in 1982 to 54% in 1985 and 65% in 1986. Due to the sudden change in the sex ratio, Dew and McConnaughey concluded that sequential, sex-specific sources of fishing mortality were at work.

Analyzing the findings of their study, Dew and McConnaughey determined a strong correlation between trawling activity and the sex ratio change as well as the total population decline. Dew and McConnaughey hypothesize that since female crabs return to and linger in Bristol Bay to lay pre-fertilized eggs, the trawling in the area disproportionally impacted the female population more than the male population and contributed to the change in sex ratio, as crabs do not die after they spawn. To account for the total change in population, they concluded the bycatch in trawls of female crabs with fertilized eggs contributed to the overall population decline, as less crab eggs were laid. Dew and McConnaughey noted that dissolving the Bristol Bay Pot Sanctuary exposed a vulnerable time in the red king crab's mating cycle to trawling. Dew and McConnaughey concluded that even though trawling contributed to altering the sex ratio and total population of red king crab, it cannot be declared the sole factor that led to the population collapse as additional factors, such as climate change, likely played a role.

== Bycatch ==
=== Bycatch reporting ===
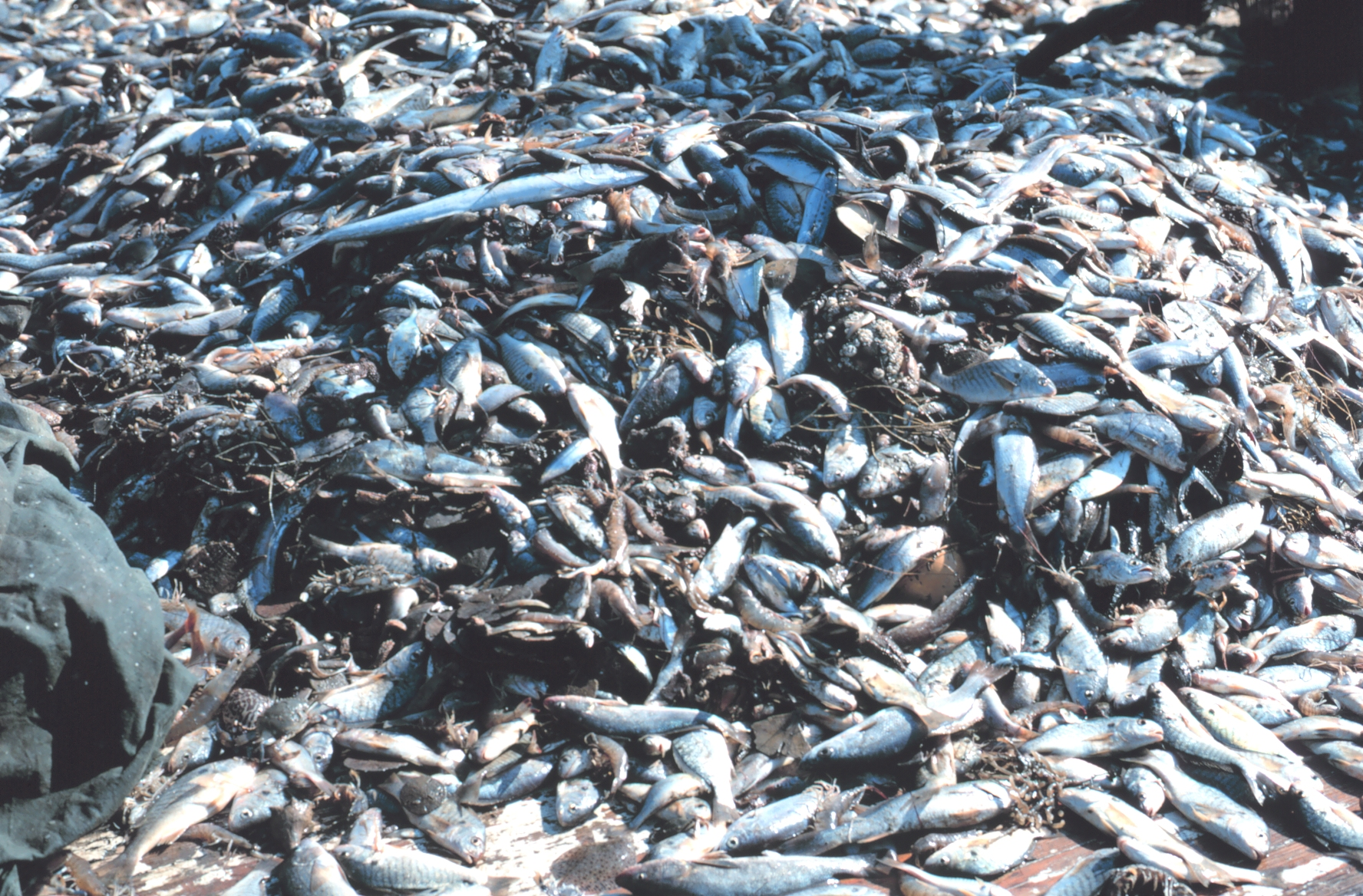
Bycatch from a Shrimp Trawl

To ensure a non-biased estimate of bycatch, a fisheries observer, an independent field biologist, is deployed to every US-based trawling vessel when required by the regulations of the fishery. The responsibilities of an observer are to collect data on fishing activity, including areas and depth fished, and gear set and retrieval times; determine catch estimates, including the amount of each species discarded; gather data on individual fish, such as sex, length, and weight; and to compile bycatch data of protected species like marine mammals and seabirds. During every trawl the observer is to stand on deck as the catch is sorted and actively estimate the catch weight of each species of bycatch using a standardized method. The data gathered by observers is shared with multiple organizations, including NOAA, which publishes its findings in the annual National Bycatch Reports, which is used to set bycatch limits for protected or regulated species and determine mortality estimates for endangered species. The observer lives aboard the vessel with the crew for the duration of the trip which can last for days or weeks. However, the observer method of monitoring trawls may not be entirely effective. Certain fisheries have bycatch limits that end a vessel's season if exceeded, and anecdotal reports of observers being pressured by crew and captain to lower their estimates have emerged. These reports center around the financial repercussions that the crew, who get paid a percentage of the total catch profits, would face if their vessel is barred from fishing. Although the reports are unverifiable, the observers claim that they underestimated the bycatch at rates of up to 50%. In 2006, an electronic method of observing bycatch that does not require an in-person observer was introduced in Canada. The monitoring method utilizes video cameras that record the retention or discarding of all fish at the hauling site during all fishing events and log time and GPS information. The data gathered from the cameras is used in conjunction with the vessel's logs and dockside monitoring of the catch as it is being unloaded to construct an estimate of the total bycatch. Each of three data sets are also used to verify one another and can alert fisheries management to dishonest practices.

Some fisheries, in the US and abroad, do not mandate an observer while the vessel operates. In these fisheries, the bycatch data is either self-reported or not reported at all. In some instances, fisherman voluntarily self-report their bycatch data to oversight bodies. The fisheries with unmonitored trawls often catch bycatch that is not as valuable as the bycatch monitored fisheries or utilize midwater trawling which yields less bycatch than the more standard bottom trawling. Fisheries that forgo bycatch reporting are encouraged by organizations such as NOAA to report their bycatch to aid the effort of tracking the health of the fishery. As the health of the ocean in the future is uncertain due to climate change and other factors, providing biologists with accurate data about a source of fish mortality is essential to preserve the renewable resource that is wild caught seafood.

=== Cost ===
Regardless of the ecological effects of trawling, the cost of bycatch as trawlers operate poses an economic issue. It is estimated by Oceana that, worldwide, fishermen lose at least $1 billion worth of potential catch annually due to the disposal of bycatch. Any animal that is caught and discarded as bycatch often dies and cannot reproduce, negatively impacting the stock of the species. Bycatch is not limited to only inexpensive species of fish. Often, well known and prized fish species are disposed of as bycatch due to size and sex restrictions or because the vessel's permit does not include the species. The highest cost associated with the bycatch of a single species is Pacific halibut, worth an annual $58.7 million. For halibut the massive bycatch cost can be attributed to trawlers catching more halibut as bycatch than the halibut fishery catches total. In 2014, seven times as many halibut were caught and discarded as trawl bycatch then in the directed fishery. Additionally, other prized fish species have an immense bycatch cost, the most costly are Sea trout worth $45.5 million, Atlantic sea scallop worth $32.7 million, red snapper worth $27.2 million, summer flounder worth $7.2 million, red grouper worth $6.7 million, Atlantic and Pacific cod worth $6.7 million, Tanner crab worth $4.6 million, king mackerel worth $4.3 million, sole worth $3.9 million, bluefin tuna worth $3.4 million, Chinook (king) salmon worth $1.4 million, and swordfish worth $1.3 million. The aforementioned estimates were determined using the wholesale market price that fishing vessels sell their fish to processors for, which is often cents on the dollar compared to the price at a store and were determined using bycatch reports from observed vessels, which have a dedicated observer to estimate the amount of bycatch a vessel captures and could be less than the true values.

Current estimates from Oceana find that 10% of all fish caught worldwide is disposed as bycatch, with some vessels returning more bycatch than what they keep per trawl. This lost potential catch of fish equates to upwards of 60,000 potential jobs for fisherman that would be needed to catch the same amount of fish in a directed fishery. Due to regulation, generally trawlers are unable to land and sell protected or regulated species caught as bycatch. Those who oppose trawling assert that since bycatch rarely returns to the ocean alive, the practice does not promote sustainable economic behavior, as each fish caught as bycatch from trawling becomes a waste product rather than being sold and eaten. Often fishermen have the means and knowledge to reduce the amount of bycatch, yet they lack the economic incentives. Examples of strategies to economically incentivize reducing bycatch are individual or pooled bycatch quotas, landings fees, risk pooling, or assurance bonds that have been implemented in other countries to encourage fishermen to adopt better practices. However, in Alaska some bycatch is utilized in a food share program created by a non-profit organization called SeaShare that is partnered with food banks across America. A group ex-trawler fishermen founded SeaShare in 1994 after successfully introducing changes to the National Marine Fisheries Service regulations to allow for the retention of bycatch solely for use by hunger-relief agencies. Since its inception SeasShare has donated 250 million servings of wild caught Alaskan seafood, totaling six million pounds (2,700,000 kg) of utilized bycatch.

== Anti-trawling devices ==
Besides the aforementioned environmental objections, trawlers also run afoul of international borders and exclusive economic zones. Sometimes more local fishermen look at particular waters as theirs even when there is no legal requirement being violated, so some environmental groups, fishermen, and even governments have deployed anti-trawling devices.

== See also ==
- Lift net – Catching fish by lifting submerged nets
- Artificial reef – Human-made underwater structure that functions as a reef
- Fisheries management – Regulation of fishing
- Overfishing – Removal of any species of fish from water at a rate that the species cannot replenish
- Environmental impact of agriculture
