= Whale Research Group =

The Whale Research Group was a research group focused on the problem of whale collisions with inshore fishing gear off the coast of Newfoundland. The group was organized by Jon Lien in 1979 and was affiliated with the Biology and Psychology departments, the Naval Architectural Engineering department, and the Ocean Sciences Centre at the Memorial University of Newfoundland. The group completed many studies to develop ways of reducing conflict between the whales and fishermen, including determining the extent of the damage to gear and whales caused by collisions, assessing fishermen's opinions on the issue, studying the causes of the collisions, developing ways to release entangled whales from gear, and designing alarms to alert whales of nearby fishing gear. The group's research on protecting different species of marine mammals from entrapment in fishing gear has been relied on by many scientists, researchers, fishermen, and other people who spend time on the ocean globally.

The group was active until 1998.

== History ==
During the 1970s, both fishing efforts and whale presence, particularly humpbacks, around Newfoundland were rising dramatically. Between 1974 and 1978, whale sightings were up between 70% and 300% depending on location and species of whale, and the amount of fishing gear in the water was increased by 300%. Because of this, there was a large rise in the number of humpback collisions with fishing gear. The Whale Research Group was founded to create solutions to this problem affecting the livelihood of many fishermen.

== Whale rescue ==
The Whale Research Group developed an Entrapment Assistance Program for fishermen to call if they encountered a whale tangled in their fishing gear. Lien and a group of staff would then travel to the scene, launch their zodiac, and remove all possible fishing gear from the whale. The group provided assistance year round, responding within 24 hours. They developed specialized tools and techniques for disentanglement. Some of the tools the group designed are catching grapnels to catch submerged lines or lines at a distance, cutting grapnels to catch and cut submerged lines or lines at a distance, and pipe knives, which are hook shaped knives which can be threaded onto a length of pipe to cut lines from a distance. All of the tools were developed to maximize the distance between the disentanglement team and the animal. Mortality rates of humpback whales entrapped in fishing gear dropped from as high as 50% to around 7% as a result of the program.

Releasing the whale as soon as possible after it gets entangled is essential to minimize damage to fishing gear, the whale, and downtime for fishermen. So the problem with having a single entrapment assistance program was that it needed to travel to the site of the entrapment, costing valuable time. Because of this, the Whale Research Group began training fishermen to release whales, giving them the tools necessary to do so.

Jon Lien and the Whale Research Group saved over 500 marine animals from entanglements, including a very significant number of the endangered North-Atlantic population of humpback whales.

Currently, marine animal release in Newfoundland has been performed by the independent Whale Release and Strandings group led by Wayne Ledwell and Julie Huntington. Since 2001, they have provided help to over 800 fishing communities for all of Newfoundland's 17,000 km coast, handling all strandings of marine mammals, and do education programs about whales. Both Ledwell and Huntington previously worked with the Whale Research Group.

== Fishing gear modifications ==
The Whale Research Group studied the effects of making modifications to fishing gear and alarm devices which could be fitted to the gear to deter whales from approaching, while not affecting fishing success. A necessity for the device was that the cost had to be low enough that it was worthwhile compared to the repair cost of a collision with the gear. The group tested several different devices including some passive devices like air filled tubes which when secured to a codtrap leader would increase echo characteristics of the net, and visual discs, which would move around slightly with the current around the net to produce a flickering of light. The group also tested active high and low frequency pinger alarms and mechanical sound devices which could be secured to the net.

Lien worked with acoustical engineers at Memorial University of Newfoundland's Centre for Cold Ocean Resources Engineering to develop the Aqualert: a device which "emits an acoustic warning signal which can be detected by whales, porpoises and dolphins at ranges exceeding 1 km, alerting them to the presence of the fishing gear and allowing them to avoid becoming entrapped."

== See also ==
- Whale entanglement
