= Wilderness Canoe Base =

Christian youth camp in Minnesota

Coordinates: 48°8′57″N 90°53′6″W

Wilderness Canoe Base is a Christian youth camp bordering the Boundary Waters Canoe Area Wilderness on Seagull Lake near the end of the Gunflint Trail, about 50 miles from Grand Marais, Minnesota. It hosts youth canoe camping trips and work-service trips during the summer and retreats for all ages year round. Part is on the northern half of Fishhook Island and another tract lays on nearby Dominion Island. It has been under the management of Lake Wapogasset Lutheran Bible Camp, Inc. since 2002.

== History ==
The first piece of land purchased in 1956 for $12,000 by Plymouth Christian Youth Center, included the upper half of Fishhook Island. Camp directors, Ham Muus and Bob Evans, led 120 boys in a camping experience which included little or no modern camp facilities.

By 1958, the number of facilities available increased severalfold. Among many other structures, three log cabins, a boathouse, fourteen sleeping units, and a trail shack were all built by campers and volunteers. Most of these structures were erected in the course of a single year, beginning early in 1958.

Fully accredited by the American Camping Association in 1963, Wilderness Canoe Base operated under the Plymouth Christian Youth Center until 2002, when Lake Wapogasset Lutheran Bible Camp, Inc of Amery, Wisconsin agreed to manage the camp's ministry and programming.

The camp has traditionally worked with youth from the inner city of Minneapolis and St. Paul. Since 1998, it has partnered with Project Success, a youth program in Minneapolis public schools, to introduce students to the Boundary Waters.

Almost one third of the 138 structures destroyed by the Ham Lake fire in May 2007 were part of Wilderness Canoe Base. Of the camp's 60 structures, 40 were consumed by flames, including outhouses and staff cabins. A year later Wilderness raised nearly $200,000 to rebuild the camp. Another $100,000 came in the form of matching funds from Thrivent Financial for Lutherans. Reconstruction and fund-raising are ongoing as many of the structures have yet to be rebuilt.
