= Greenseas =

Brand of seafood products

Greenseas is a brand of shelf-stable fish products owned by the H. J. Heinz Company. They produce a range of popular goods, including tuna, salmon and sardines.

== See also ==
- Canned tuna
