= Dolphin safe label =

Label denoting compliance with laws or policies during fishing for tuna for canning

Dolphin-safe labels are used to denote compliance with laws or policies designed to minimize dolphin fatalities during fishing for tuna destined for canning.

Some labels impose stricter requirements than others. Dolphin-safe tuna labeling originates in the United States. The term Dolphin Friendly is often used in Europe, and has the same meaning, although, in Latin America, the standards for Dolphin Safe/Dolphin Friendly tuna is different than elsewhere. The labels have become increasingly controversial since their introduction, particularly among sustainability groups in the U.S., but this stems from the fact that Dolphin Safe was never meant to be an indication of tuna sustainability. Many U.S. labels that carry dolphin-safe labels are amongst the least sustainable for oceans, according to Greenpeace's 2017 Shopping Guide.

While the Dolphin Safe label and its standards have legal status in the United States under the Dolphin Protection Consumer Information Act, a part of the US Marine Mammal Protection Act, tuna companies around the world adhere to the standards on a voluntary basis, managed by the non-governmental organization Earth Island Institute, based in Berkeley, California. The Inter-American Tropical Tuna Commission has promoted an alternative Dolphin Safe label, which requires 100% coverage by independent observers on boats and limits the overall mortality of dolphins in the ocean. This label is mostly used in Latin America.

According to the U.S. Consumers Union, Earth Island and U.S. dolphin safe labels provide no guarantee that dolphins are not harmed during the fishing process because verification is neither universal nor independent. Still, tuna fishing boats and canneries operating under any of the various U.S. labeling standards are subject to surprise inspection and observation. For US import, companies face strict charges of fraud for any violation of the label standards, while Earth Island Institute (EII), an independent environmental organization, verifies the standards are met by more than 700 tuna companies outside the U.S through inspections of canneries, storage units, and audits of fishing logs. Earth Island Institute receives donations from the companies it verifies; and EII has never had an external scientific audit of its labeling program, a best practice for eco-labels. International observers are increasingly part of the Dolphin Safe verification process, being present on virtually purse seine tuna boats in the Eastern Pacific Ocean.

== Background ==
Dolphins are a common bycatch in fisheries. There are more than 90,000 dolphins estimated to be killed annually in tuna fisheries worldwide. These mortalities occur around the globe. True mortality associated with tuna is only known in fisheries with full regulation and onboard observation. The dolphins, who swim closer to the surface than tuna, may be used as an indicator of tuna presence. Labeling was originally intended to discourage fishing boats from netting dolphins with tuna.

The tuna fishery in the Eastern Tropical Pacific is the only fishery that deliberately targets, chases, and nets dolphins, resulting in estimates of 6-7 million dolphins dying in tuna nets since the practice was introduced in the late 1950s, the largest directed kill of dolphins on Earth. With the onset of the Dolphin Safe label program, started in the US in 1990 but soon spreading to foreign tuna operations, the deaths of dolphins has decreased considerably, with official counts, based on observer coverage, of around 1,000 dolphins per year. However, research by the US National Marine Fisheries Service has shown that chasing the dolphins causes baby dolphins to fall behind the pod, resulting in a large "cryptic" kill, likely damaging populations of dolphins, as the young starve or are eaten by sharks while the main pod is held by the nets. Thus, claims that tuna fishing can continue to chase and net dolphins and not cause harm are not backed by scientific research.

Dolphins do not associate with Skipjack tuna and this species is most likely to be truly "dolphin safe". However, the species of tuna is not always mentioned on the can.

== Criticism ==
=== Definition ===
In 1990, the organization Earth Island Institute and tuna companies in the US agreed to define Dolphin Safe tuna as tuna caught without setting nets on or near dolphins. This standard was incorporated into the Marine Mammal Protection Act later that year as the Dolphin Protection Consumer Information Act. Those standards were also adopted by Earth Island Institute in developing agreements with more than 700 tuna companies around the world — the companies pledged to adhere to the standards and open their operations up to Earth Island's international monitors.

In 1997, the standards for Dolphin Safe tuna were expanded by Congress with the passage of the International Dolphin Conservation Program Act, amending the Marine Mammal Protection Act to include the standard that no dolphins were killed or seriously injured in a net set to qualify that tuna for a Dolphin Safe label.

In 1999, via the Inter-American Tropical Tuna Commission, several nations adopted the Agreement on the International Dolphin Conservation Program, which set up standards for a different Dolphin Safe/Dolphin Friendly label by nations that continue to chase and net dolphins to catch tuna. The AIDCP standard allows up to 5,000 dolphins be killed annually in tuna net sets, while encouraging the release of dolphins unharmed. Critics note that the AIDCP standard ignores the cryptic kill of baby dolphins and still subjects dolphins to extreme physiological stress, injuries, and mortality.

In a 2008 report, Greenpeace notes dolphin-safe labels may make consumers believe the relevant tuna is environmentally friendly. However, the dolphin-safe label only indicates the by-catch contained no dolphins. It does not specify that the by-catch contained no other species, nor does it imply anything about the environmental impact of the hunt itself.

In May 2012, the World Trade Organization ruled that the dolphin safe label, as used in the U.S., focuses too narrowly on fishing methods, and too narrowly on the Eastern Tropical Pacific. The U.S. label does not address dolphin mortalities in other parts of the world. The US subsequently expanded reporting and verification procedures to all oceans of the world, while maintaining the strong standards for the Dolphin Safe label, to come into compliance with the WTO decision.

In 2013, the Campaign for Eco-Safe Tuna launched a formal campaign to end the use of the dolphin-safe label in the U.S. The grassroots activist group advocates adoption of the International Dolphin Conservation Program (AIDCP) label in place of the current U.S. Department of Commerce label. The AIDCP label is currently in use in the following states or countries: Belize, Colombia, Costa Rica, Ecuador, El Salvador, European Union, Guatemala, Honduras, Mexico, Nicaragua, Panama, Peru, United States, Venezuela. The Campaign for Eco-Safe Tuna represents the tuna fishing industry and government agencies of Latin America that continue to advocate chasing and netting dolphins to catch tuna.

=== Pricing ===
Tuna consumption has declined since awareness of the dolphin-safe issue peaked in 1989. Some critics attribute this to the strict standards of U.S. laws, which they claim have lowered the quality of tuna.

The impact of dolphin-safe standards on the price of tuna is debatable. While the trend in cost has been downward, critics claim that the price would have dropped much further without the dolphin-safe standards.

=== Non-dolphin bycatch ===
Early on, Earth Island instituted additional protections for sea turtles and sharks with its cooperating tuna companies. Earth Island first proposed that sea turtles in tuna nets be released in 1996, a provision which has now been adopted by international agreement by all tuna fishing treaty organizations. Earth Island further banned shark finning on tuna vessels in the Dolphin Safe program, a measure which is also slowly being adopted by treaty organizations.

The dolphin-safe labeling program has also been criticized for not providing consumers with information on non-dolphin bycatch. Critics have suggested the "cuteness" of dolphins is improperly used by environmental groups to raise money and draw attention for the labeling program, while tuna bycatch is in fact a much more significant problem for other species. Over a million sharks die each year as bycatch, as do hundreds of thousands of wahoo, dorado, thousands of marlin and many mola mola. The resulting reduction in numbers of such major predators has a huge environmental impact that is often overlooked. These figures do not reflect the increasing efforts of tuna fishermen to reduce bycatch through research and improved fishing practices introduced by the tuna fishing treaty organizations and the industry group International Seafood Sustainability Foundation.

Trade organizations, industry groups and environmental advocates have sharply criticized Earth Island's program in the United States and elsewhere, which is mostly based on self-certifications by fishing captains that they killed no dolphins. The groups argue that Earth Island's dolphin-safe tuna “label means absolutely nothing in terms of sustainability. That label has been used to can tuna that could have caused severe mortalities of dolphins and other marine species of the ecosystem.” The issue has created economic and diplomatic tension between the U.S. and Mexico. The U.S. ban has been blamed for severe economic problems in fishing villages like Ensenada.

== World Trade Organization ==
Starting 2008, Mexico raised complaints with the World Trade Organization's (WTO) about US import restrictions and use of dolphin safe labeling on Tuna products. It was taken to the body's dispute settle system and the case was given the short title US-Tuna II (Mexico).

Two reports were issued on the discriminatory aspects of the US legislation regarding dolphin-safe labels. The WTO Panel Report was published on 15 September 2011 and the WTO's Appellate Body Report was published on 16 May 2012.

The US government has strongly opposed these decisions and continues to improve the Dolphin Safe implementation procedures to expand provisions in keeping with the WTO concerns without weakening the Dolphin Safe label standards.

On November 20, 2015, the WTO Appellate Body ruled against the United States.

The US strongly opposes the claims by the WTO, noting that US Dolphin Safe standards provide more protection to dolphins than other weaker standards promoted by the government of Mexico and the Inter-American Tropical Tuna Commission (mainly concerned with promoting tuna fishing) and that the US has strengthened review of Dolphin Safe tuna in other areas of the world.

Hundreds of environmental organizations condemned the WTO for putting support for free trade over environmental considerations, such as protection of dolphins.

In January 2019, the WTO ruled in favor of the US that the dolphin safe labelling was compliant and consistent with WTO rules.

== Countries of usage ==
=== Australia ===
Some Australian tuna brands self-certify as "Dolphin Safe" or "Dolphin Friendly". Dolphins generally don't associate with tuna in the regions where tuna is predominantly sourced for the Australian market.

Labels
Greenseas dolphin safe label.	This label is used on Greenseas tuna cans in Australia. According to Greenseas, the tuna is not caught in the Eastern Tropical Pacific Ocean, nor are driftnets or gillnets used during the capture. The tuna is caught in either Australian waters or in the Western Pacific Ocean. Greenseas meets the standards set by the Earth Island Institute mentioned above.
John West Australia dolphin friendly label.	This label is used on John West Australia tuna cans. According to John West Australia, the tuna is caught using purse seine nets, with the exception being their pole and line caught range.

=== Netherlands ===
Labels
Princes Foods dolphin friendly label in Dutch	A Dutch label used by Princes Group on tuna cans. The text translates to "Caught dolphin friendly". More often, the label is in English and Princes products are sold in many European countries, especially the United Kingdom. According to the company, the label assures that no dolphins were chased or netted while fishing for the tuna, that the boats try to fish for tuna only when no dolphins are present, and that when dolphins accidentally end up in nets, they are released. It also meets the standards set by the Earth Island Institute mentioned above.

=== New Zealand ===
Labels
Sealord dolphin friendly logo.	Sealord, a major fishing company in New Zealand, has a dolphin friendly label. The company states that they purchase tuna from companies that are certified and monitored by the Earth Island Institute.

=== United Kingdom ===
Virtually all canned tuna in the UK is labelled as dolphin-safe because the market is almost exclusively skipjack tuna. It is thus not implicated in the dolphin by-catch problem associated with the yellowfin tuna of the Eastern Tropical Pacific consumed in the US. The concerns being addressed in the UK are different from those in the US: they are preventative to ensure that tuna sold does not become unsafe for dolphins, rather than rectifying an existing environmental problem.

=== United States ===
The dolphin-safe movement in the U.S. was led by environmental and consumer groups in response to the use of total encirclement netting. With this method, fishermen surrounded dolphin pods along with the tuna they were catching and the dolphins were given no chance to escape before the nets were lifted. This resulted in large numbers of dolphins being killed, imperiling the survival of entire species of dolphin, specifically in the Eastern Tropical Pacific.

In 1990, the U.S. passed the Dolphin Protection Consumer Information Act (DPCIA). The law had three main provisions:

- Protecting dolphins from capture by purse seine nets.
- Providing labeling standards for tuna exported from or sold in the U.S.
- Setting penalties for noncompliance.

This protected dolphins in U.S. waters, but canneries were free to purchase tuna from domestic and foreign fisheries, so the U.S. regulations could not assure U.S. consumers they were purchasing dolphin-safe tuna. However, the US does have strict provisions for reviewing tuna imports, including requiring statements by onboard independent observers (most tuna purse seine vessels in areas that export tuna to the US now have observers onboard), as well as strong fraud protection laws against false claims of Dolphin Safe.

Labels
United States Department of Commerce dolphin safe label.	The United States Department of Commerce dolphins safe label was established in 1990. Standards for the label state that tuna caught using purse seine fishing methods within the Eastern Tropical Pacific Ocean did not involve the deliberate netting or circling of any dolphins. This must have been verified by an observer from the National Marine Fisheries Service on the fishing vessel that caught the fish. Tuna caught using a different method or in most other ocean areas may be given this label without any outside observation.
"Flipper Seal of Approval" dolphin safe label.	The Flipper Seal of Approval dolphin safe label is an initiative by the organization EarthTrust. Most notable requirements are that it does not allow tuna caught using driftnets, gillnets, by the intentional setting of purse seine nets on dolphins, or, in the Eastern Tropical Pacific Ocean, any method except for hook and line fishing. Independent observers from EarthTrust must be allowed to monitor the fishing process. The label also features the character, Flipper.
Earth Island Institute dolphin safe label.	This dolphin safe tuna label is an initiative from the Earth Island Institute. Requirements are that dolphins may not be intentionally chased, circled or netted; driftnets and gillnets cannot be used. Fish from a dolphin unfriendly source may not be added at any stage. This label has come under scrutiny by the World Trade Organization and environmental groups in the U.S. for failing to ensure that dolphins are not harmed and for failing to account for non-dolphin bycatch. These claims do not take into account that the Dolphin Safe label was never meant to be a "sustainability" label for tuna and that Earth Island works with tuna fishermen to avoid and reduce bycatch of non-target species.
