= Species Survival Network =

- Founded: 1992
- Type: International Organization
- Purpose: international wildlife trade
- Region served: Worldwide
- Website: www.ssn.org

The Species Survival Network (SSN), founded in 1992, is an international coalition of over 80 non-governmental organizations (NGOs) committed to the promotion, enhancement, and strict enforcement of the Convention on International Trade in Endangered Species of Wild Fauna and Flora (CITES). Through scientific and legal research, education and advocacy, the SSN is working to prevent over-exploitation of animals and plants due to international trade.

The trade in parrots for pets, alligator hide handbags, dried seahorse curios, elephant ivory, and ramin pool cues are just a few examples of the billion dollar international trade in wildlife and plants. The scope and impact of this trade that has been responsible for the decline of wild populations of a number of species of animals and plants.

SSN believes that such trade can occur only when evidence positively demonstrates that survival of the species, subspecies or populations and their role in the ecosystems in which they occur will not be detrimentally affected by trade and when trade in live animals minimizes the risk of injury, damage to health or cruel treatment. The species must always receive the benefit of the doubt if available evidence is uncertain.

== Criteria for sustainability ==
The CITES Parties have recognized, in Articles III and IV of the CITES Treaty, that international commercial trade in plants and animals must not be detrimental to the survival of species, or in other words, that it must be sustainable. Too often, use of a species is claimed to be sustainable in the absence of evidence to support this claim. Such evidence should be provided by those who wish to label a use “sustainable”. SSN has developed the following criteria to assist Parties when assessing the sustainability of trade in wild fauna and flora. Proposals to remove or reduce the level of protection afforded, or to start or increase international commercial trade in, a species should meet all of the following criteria:

- Information is collected
- A science-based management system is in place
- The Precautionary Principle is applied
- Government policies, laws and institutions are in place
- People living in the vicinity of the used population are empowered and experience benefits
- Economic sustainability is demonstrated
- Long-term conservation benefits are demonstrated
- The use is compatible with other uses of the species and is not detrimental to other species
- Animals are protected from cruelty and suffering, and incidental mortality is avoided

For more detail on the individual criteria, please see the link below on SSN's Criteria for Assessing the Sustainability of Trade in Wild Fauna and Flora

== See also ==
- Wildlife smuggling
