= Pair trawling =

Fishing activity using two boats

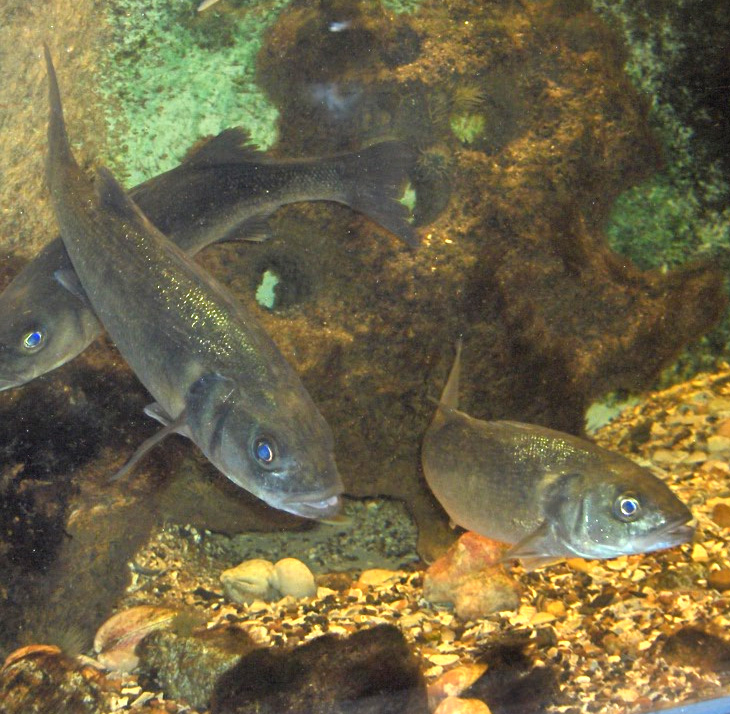
European seabass (Dicentrarchus labrax), once target of a pair-trawl fishery in the English Channel, now banned due to the high level of cetacean bycatch

Pair trawling is a fishing activity carried out by two boats, with one towing each warp (the towing cables). As the mouth of the net is kept open by the lateral pull of the individual vessels, otter boards are not required. With the towing power of two boats and no otter boards, a larger net may be worked than would otherwise be possible, or alternatively, the two boats can share increased fuel efficiency.

As doors are not necessary, the gear arrangements are simplified, with the warps attaching directly to the wings of the net. Setting and hauling of the nets are carried out by one boat, while the other is only used for towing; usually each will take turns at these operations.

Pair trawling is effective on all demersal species. In shallow waters, where the noise from a single vessel may scatter fish, two vessels operating a distance apart tend to herd fish into the path of the net. Catch per vessel often considerably exceeds that attainable through standard bottom trawling. Pair trawlers targeting cod off the coast of New England have reported average per vessel catches of three to six times that from single trawls.

Because of the increased efficiency of pair trawling, vessels are able to tow their gears in mid-water at a faster speed to target species which are normally able to escape trawl nets, such as the European seabass. This has caused some controversy, due to the high level of marine mammal bycatch associated, leading to the British government introducing a ban on pair trawling for bass in UK territorial waters.
