= Midwater trawling =

Fishing method that involves a vessel towing a net in the water column

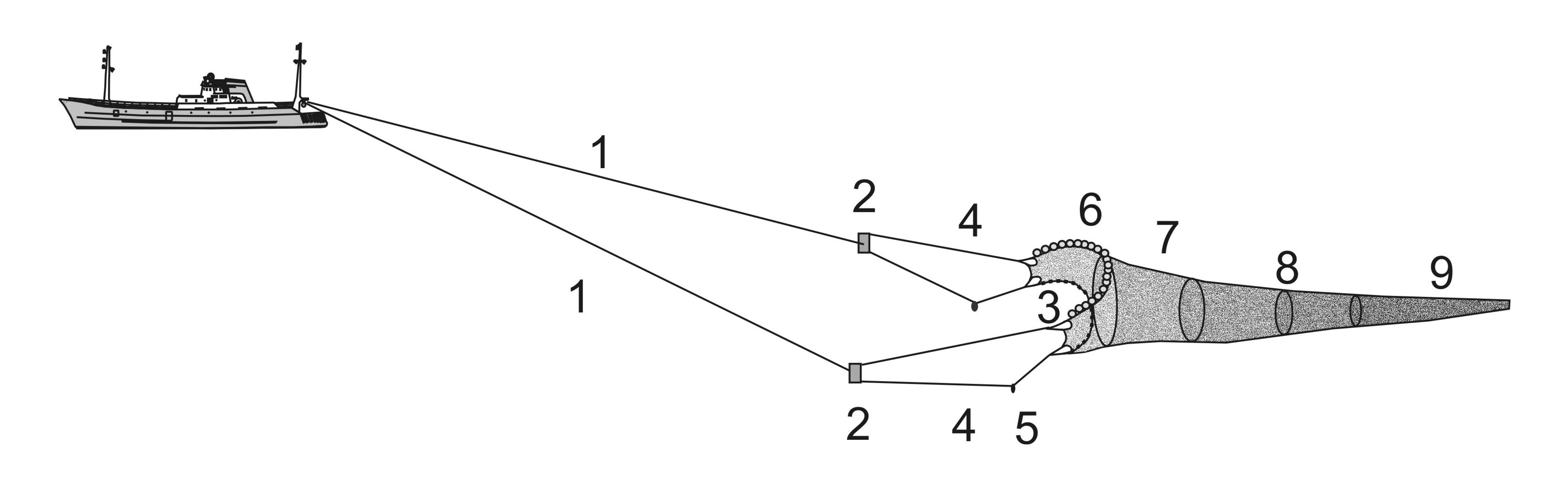
Midwater (pelagic) otter trawl 1: trawl warp, 2: otter boards, 3: longline chains, 4 hunter, 5: weights 6: headline with floats, 7: pre-net, 8: tunnel and belly, 9: codend

Midwater trawling is trawling, or net fishing, at a depth that is higher in the water column than the bottom of the ocean. It is contrasted with bottom trawling. Midwater trawling is also known as pelagic trawling and bottom trawling as benthic trawling.

In midwater trawling, a cone-shaped net can be towed behind a single boat and spread by trawl doors, or it can be towed behind two boats (pair trawling) which act as the spreading device. Midwater trawling catches pelagic fish such as anchovies, shrimp, tuna and mackerel, whereas bottom trawling targets both bottom living fish (groundfish) and semi-pelagic fish such as: cod, squid, halibut and rockfish.

Whilst midwater trawling does not damage the seafloor (like bottom trawling), the method is not perfectly selective and results in relatively high levels of discards of unwanted catches.

== See also ==
- Trawling
- Bottom trawling
