= Drift netting =

Fishing technique

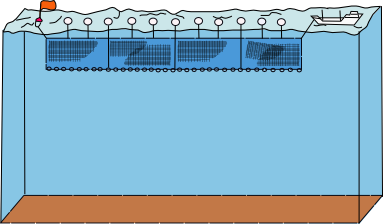
Drift netting.

Drift netting is a fishing technique where nets, called drift nets, hang vertically in the water column without being anchored to the bottom. The nets are kept vertical in the water by floats attached to a rope along the top of the net and weights attached to another rope along the bottom of the net. Drift nets generally rely on the entanglement properties of loosely affixed netting. Folds of loose netting, much like a window drapery, snag on a fish's tail and fins and wrap the fish up in loose netting as it struggles to escape. However, the nets can also function as gill nets if fish are captured when their gills get stuck in the net. The size of the mesh varies depending on the fish being targeted. These nets usually target schools of pelagic fish.

Traditionally drift nets were made of organic materials, such as hemp, which were biodegradable. Prior to 1950, nets tended to have a larger mesh size. The larger mesh only caught the larger fish, allowing the smaller, younger ones to slip through. When drift net fishing grew in scale during the 1950s, the industry changed to synthetic materials with smaller mesh size. Synthetic nets last longer, are odourless and may be nearly invisible in the water, and do not biodegrade. Most countries regulate drift net fisheries within their territories. Such fisheries are also often regulated by international agreements.

Drift net fishing became a commercial fishing practice because it is cost effective. Nets can be placed by low-powered vessels making it fuel efficient. Drift nets are also effective at bringing in large amounts of fish in one catch.

Prior to the 1960s net size was not limited, and commercially produced nets were commonly as long as 50 kilometres (31 mi). In 1987 the U.S. enacted the Driftnet Impact, Monitoring, Assessment and Control Act limiting the length of nets used in American waters to 1.5 nautical miles (1.7 mi; 2.8 km). In 1989 the United Nations General Assembly (UNGA) placed a moratorium on the practice of drift net fishing. In 1992 the UN banned the use of drift nets longer than 2.5 km long in international waters.

== Controversy ==
=== Bycatch ===
Any fish that crosses the path of a drift net in the ocean may be tangled or caught in the net. This leads to fish species becoming endangered or even extinct. Non-target individuals caught in the net are called by-catch. In 1994 United Nations Food and Agriculture Organization (UNFAO) estimated global by-catch rates to be as high as 27 million tons of fish discarded by fisheries each year. Many individuals of non-target species perish as by-catch in the cast of each drift net. As a result, many such species are now endangered. Species caught as by-catch include sharks, dolphins, whales, turtles, sea birds, and other marine mammals. Since nets are placed and may not be retrieved for days, air-breathing mammals that become tangled in the nets drown if they are unable to free themselves. In certain areas, exemption from punitive measure due to the unintentional by-catch of marine mammals, as outlined by the Marine Mammal Protection Act, is extended to commercial drift fishermen.

In the 1990s, drift net fisheries were responsible for 30,000 tons of sharks and skates in global by-catch annually. While filming National Geographic's Incidental Kill in the California Channel Islands where swordfish and various sharks swim north, the divers discovered that many drift net boats had placed nets that night. The nets were one mile long each and nearly 100 feet (30 m) high placed to target swordfish and thresher sharks. They swam half the length of one net and in that length discovered 32 dead blue sharks in the net as well as 2 hammerhead sharks, a sea lion, and a manta ray all of which were thrown back into the ocean when the net was hauled in.

Although long line fisheries are the main contributor to sea bird by-catch, sea birds are also caught in drift nets in significant numbers. Studies conducted on 30 small-scale drift net fisheries in the Baltic Sea estimate that 90,000 sea birds die annually in drift nets.

Bycatch is thrown back to the ocean either dead or with injuries that may result in death. If not eaten, dead animals decompose, as bacteria use oxygen to break down the organic matter. Large amounts of dead matter decomposing in the ocean causes the surrounding levels of dissolved oxygen to decrease.

=== Environmental damage ===
Drift nets lost or abandoned at sea due to storms causing strong currents, accidental loss, or purposeful discard become ghost nets. Synthetic nets are resistant to rot or breakdown, therefore ghost nets fish indefinitely in the oceans. Marine animals are easily tangled in ghost nets as are the predators the dead animals attract. The float line on the net allows it to be pushed in the current which causes ecological damage to plant life and substrate habitats as the nets drag the sea floor.

In addition, oceanic microplastics pollution is largely caused by plastic-made fishing gear like drift nets, that are wearing down by use, lost or thrown away.

=== Illegal fishing ===
Most countries have jurisdiction over the waters within 200 nautical miles of their shores, called the exclusive economic zone, set by the Law of the Sea. Outside these boundaries lie international waters, or the high seas. While fishing in international waters, vessels must comply with regulations of the country in whose flag they fly, but there are no enforcers on the high seas. International waters make up 50% of the world's surface, yet are its least protected habitat.

Declining fish stocks have caused illegal fishing practices to increase. Illegal, unregulated, or unreported fishing catch between 11 and 26 million tons a year which accounts for one quarter of global catch. Illegal fishing includes taking undersized fish, fishing in closed waters, taking more fish than permitted, or fishing during seasonal closures. Illegal fishing is prominent due to lack of enforcement or punishments.

Despite controls, violations of drift net fishing laws are commonplace. The Mediterranean Sea is the most overexploited. With 21 modern states with coastline on the sea, there are many fisheries harvesting one small area. When drift net gear was banned, manufacturers modified the design of the nets so they no longer fell under the banned definition. A new definition was established in 2007 as "any gillnet held on the sea surface or at a certain distance below it by floating devices, drifting with the current, either independently or with the boat to which it may be attached. It may be equipped with devices aiming to stabilize the net or to limit drift".

Japanese drift net fishing began to draw public attention in the mid-1980s when Japan and other Asian countries began to send large fleets to the North Pacific Ocean to catch tuna and squid. Japan operated about 900 drift net vessels, earning around $300 million a year. Those fishing boats were blamed not only for indiscriminate destruction of marine life, but also for poaching North Pacific salmon, harming the U.S. and Canadian fishing industries, and threatening the jobs of fishermen who did not use such methods. The first Bush administration opposed a U.S. driftnet ban because it would allegedly conflict with a treaty with Japan and Canada regarding salmon fishing in the North Pacific.

== Other uses ==
Drift nets also are used in ecological studies in studying the downstream drift of invertebrates and Ichthyoplankton. The nets are strung across a stream and allowed to sit overnight, collecting samples. These nets are crucial in the understanding of how watersheds function. Quantitative estimates derived from drift nets used in this way in rivers need careful consideration given the clogging of the nets and decay in performance that can occur as a result.

== See also ==
- Earthtrust
- Catastrophic drift netting
