= Marine Fish Conservation Network =

Non profit organization in Arlington, Virginia, US

The Marine Fish Conservation Network is a not-for-profit organisation located in Arlington, Virginia. Its primary function is the conservation of marine ecosystems through lobbying for regulations concerning overfishing, and revitalising fish populations. It is the largest organisation in the United States dedicated to sustainable fishing. The organisation has undertaken lobbying to shift the United States' fishing regulation from exploitation-orientated to conservation-and-rehabilitation-orientated. It is made up of a number of smaller fishermen, conservation and scientist groups. The Marine Fish Conservation Network also has an associated blog, which covers topics such as current issues affecting marine ecosystems, as well as other marine ecosystem related articles. The current executive director of the Marine Fish Conservation Network is Robert Vandermark.

== History ==
The Marine Fish Conservation Network was founded in 1993 in an attempt to reverse the decline in fish populations, particularly through the 1980s. In particular, this was done by campaigning for major legislation changes, in the Sustainable Fisheries Act of 1996 and the amendment of the Magnuson–Stevens Fishery Conservation and Management Act 2006. They have also been involved in fundraising to ensure the enforcement of the regulations, as well as producing a series of reports into the effectiveness of these legislative changes.

== Achievements ==
The main achievements of the Marine Fish Conservation Network are underpinned by their campaigning to alter laws and regulations surrounding fishing, from exploitation towards conservation. The two main regulations changes campaigned for by the Network are outlined below:

=== Sustainable Fisheries Act 1996 ===
The Marine Fish Conservation Network took part in a campaigning effort lasting four years to assist in the implementation of the Sustainable Fisheries Act 1996. The campaign was led to attempt to change regulations surrounding fishing, which had previously been defined by the Magnuson-Stevens Fishery Conservation and Management Act 1976 and is the original reason for the foundation of the organisation. As a result of this change, fishing regulations in the United States became focused around rehabilitating fish populations and conserving marine ecosystems, as opposed to the previous pro-exploitation agenda. Following the implementation of the Sustainable Fisheries Act, the Marine Fish Conservation Network also worked to block members of Congress from removing key policies from the act. They also produced a number of reports that found the act was not being sufficiently implemented and overfishing was still occurring, and ineffective plans had been implemented to allow for rehabilitation of marine ecosystems.

=== Magnuson-Stevens Fishery Conservation Act Amendment 2006 ===
The Marine Fish Conservation Network also pushed for reforms to fishing legislation in 2006, which resulted in the amendment of the Magnuson-Stevens Fishery Conservation and Management Act 1976. The act included many of the recommendations made by the Network, such as the use of a quota system for allocating catch limits to commercial and recreational fishermen. Currently, the Network continues to be involved in campaigning for changes to this act to improve sustainability and management of the act. They have also opposed proposed the removal of restrictions within the bill made by members of Congress.

== Current Efforts ==
=== Recreational Fishing Management Act 2017 ===
The Marine Fish Conservation Network is currently pushing for another amendment to the Magnuson-Stevens Fishery Conservation Act to encompass recreational fishing as well as commercial fishing. This change has been targeted by the group as they believe recreational fishing has a large impact on fisheries, because these fishermen tend to target high-value fish as opposed to large quantities of low value fish mostly targeted by commercial fisheries. This has so far resulted in the submission of an Amendment in the Nature of a Substitute. The Network is still campaigning for this change, as well as for some changes to be made to the current amendment that has been proposed. The most notable is the ability for regional fishery management councils to implement further management measures beyond simple catch limits, such as regular studies of fisheries and the ability to set different annual catch limits if required.
