= Western Pacific Regional Fishery Management Council =

Offshore fisheries agency

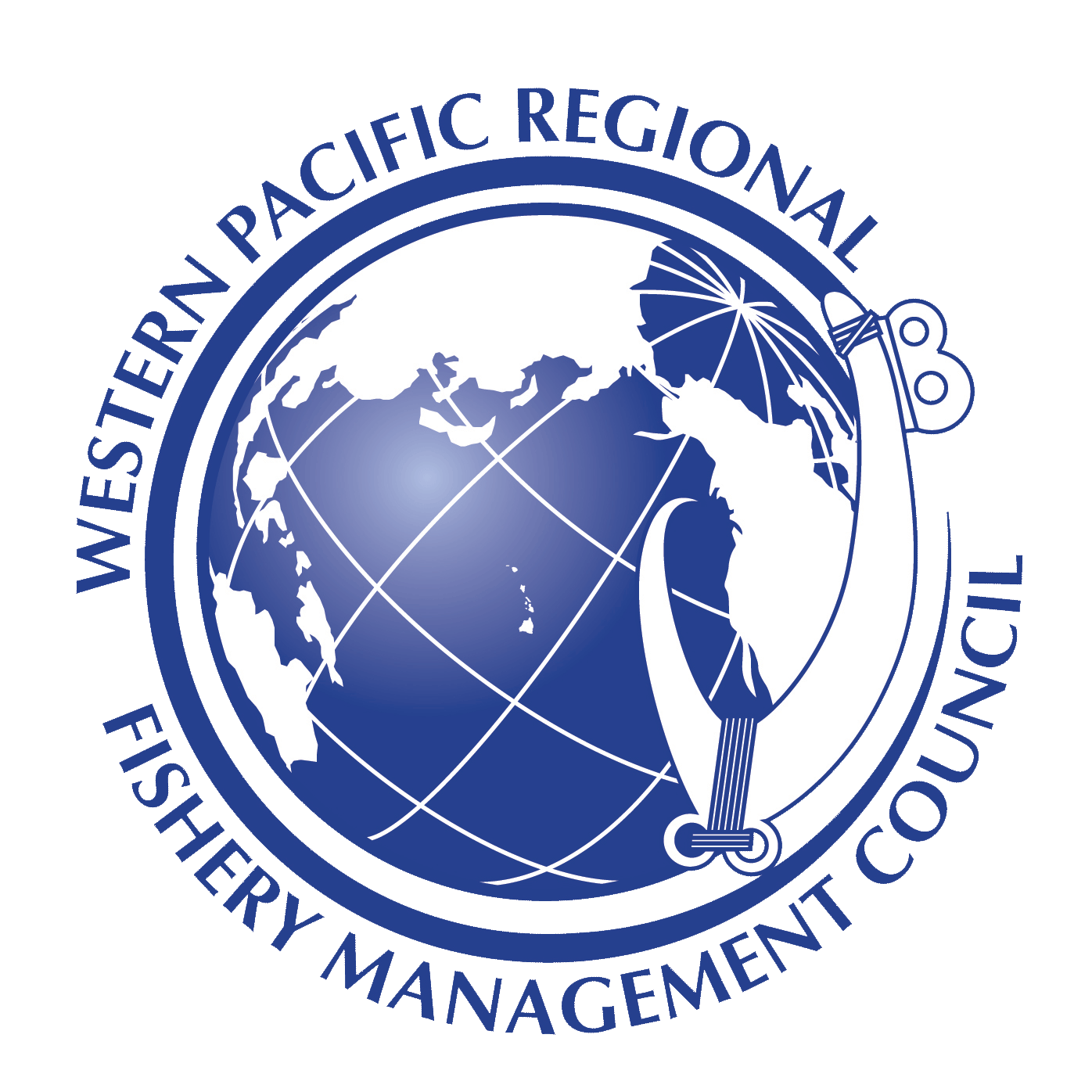

The Western Pacific Regional Fishery Management Council (WPRFMC, also referred to as "Westpac", WestPac", or the "Council") is one of eight regional councils established under the Magnuson-Stevens Fishery Conservation and Management Act (MSA) in 1976 to manage offshore fisheries. The Council is based in Honolulu, Hawaii.

The Council's jurisdiction includes the US exclusive economic zone (EEZ) waters (generally 3–200 miles offshore) around the State of Hawaii; US Territories of American Samoa and Guam; the Commonwealth of the Northern Mariana Islands (CNMI); and the US Pacific remote island areas of Johnston, Midway, Palmyra and Wake Atolls; Baker, Howland and Jarvis Islands; and Kingman Reef. This area of nearly 1.5 million square miles is the size of the continental United States and constitutes about half of the entire US EEZ. It spans both sides of the equator and both sides of the dateline. The Council also manages domestic fisheries based in the US Pacific Islands that operate on the high seas.

== Role ==
The WPRFMC fulfills a central role in the management of the nation's marine fisheries resources. Its primary role is to prepare, monitor and amend management plans for offshore fisheries based in the Western Pacific Region. Each plan contains a suite of management measures and associated regulations that have been implemented to support sustainable fisheries, reduce and mitigate interactions with protected species, and conserve marine habitat and ecosystems.

The plans and fishery regulations are dynamic and reflect the WPRFMC's adaptive management, which monitors and addresses changing conditions based on the best available information. In developing these plans, the WPRFMC provides a public forum for decision-making and works closely with communities, local governments, federal agencies and local and international organizations.

The MSA authorizes fishery management councils to create Fishery Management Plans (FMP). Since the 1980s, the WPRFMC has managed fisheries throughout the Western Pacific Region through separate species-based FMPs – the Bottomfish and Seamount Groundfish FMP., the Crustaceans FMP, the Precious Corals FMP, the Coral Reef Ecosystems FMP and the Pelagic FMP

However, in 2010, the WPRFMC began moving towards an ecosystem-based approach to fisheries management and is restructuring its management framework from species-based FMPs to place-based FEP. Recognizing that a comprehensive ecosystem approach to fisheries management must be initiated through an incremental, collaborative, and adaptive management process, a multi-step approach is being used to develop and implement the FEPs. To be successful, this will require increased understanding of a range of issues including, biological and trophic relationships, ecosystem indicators and models, and the ecological effects of non-fishing activities on the marine environment.

The WPRFMC currently has five place-based FEPs, one each for Hawaii, American Samoa and Mariana (Guam and CNMI) Archipelagos; one for the US Pacific Remote Island Areas (PRIAs); and another for the Pacific Pelagic fisheries. The approach of these management plans allows explicit consideration to be given to the ecosystem interactions within each of the areas managed by the WPRFMC.

=== International roles ===
Vessels from Hawaii fish on the high seas in both the Western and Central Pacific Ocean and the Eastern Pacific Ocean, which are included in the jurisdictions of the Western and Central Pacific Fisheries Commission and the Inter-American Tropical Tuna Commission, respectively. The Council is involved in these regional fishery management organizations and other international bodies and initiatives to address resource management issues such as marine debris, marine education, and conservation of tuna and tuna-like species, seamount resources, deepwater corals and protected species, including seabirds, sea turtles, marine mammals and sharks.

=== Local roles ===
The WPRFMC also plays a significant facilitation role in the Community Demonstration Project Program (CDPP), Community Development Program, and Marine Education and Training Program. These programs were created by Congress through the MSA to promote continued participation of indigenous communities in Pacific Island fisheries. The WPRFMC also supports fishery development and resource management projects identified in the Marine Conservation Plans of American Samoa, Guam and CNMI through the Western Pacific Sustainable Fisheries Fund (SFF), also established by the MSA.

== Components of the WPRFMC system ==
The WPRFMC system is composed of Council Members, Council Staff, and advisory bodies that advise the Council and the public that participates in the Council decision-making process.

=== Composition ===
The Council has 13 voting members and three non-voting members.

- 8 of the 13 voting members are private citizens who are familiar with the commercial and/or non-commercial fisheries, marine conservation or both. Four members must be from each of the island areas of American Samoa, CNMI, Guam and Hawaii. The other four seats are at-large seats. All eight members are appointed by the Secretary of Commerce from lists submitted by the Governors of each of the island areas. They serve 3 year terms and can serve up to 3 consecutive terms.
- The last 5 voting members represent: the American Samoa Department of Marine and Wildlife Resources, the CNMI Department of Lands and Natural Resources, the Guam Department of Agriculture, the Hawaii Department of Land and Natural Resources and the NMFS Pacific Islands Regional Office.
- The 3 non-voting members who assist the Council in decision making are: The US Coast Guard-14th District, US Department of State and the US Fish and Wildlife Service.

=== Advisory bodies ===
When reviewing potential regulatory changes, the WPRFMC also draws upon the services of knowledgeable people from local and federal agencies, universities and the public, who serve on WPRFMC panels and committees. Advisory bodies include the Scientific and Statistical Committee (SSC), the Advisory Panel (AP), the Archipelagic and Pelagic Plan Teams, Regional Ecosystem Advisory Committees (REAC) and other committees.

- Scientific and Statistical Committee (SSC) – The SSC reviews the scientific and technical aspects of fisheries in the western Pacific Region and provides the Council with management recommendations. SSC members are resource economists, biologists, sociologists, population modelers and other experts.
- Plan Teams – The council has teams of scientists, managers and industry representatives who make recommendations to the Council based on their annual review of the region's bottomfish and seamount groundfish, coral reef ecosystem, crustaceans, pelagics and precious coral fisheries.
- Advisory Panel (AP) – The council receives advice from a panel of recreational and commercial fishermen, charter boat operators, buyers, sellers, consumers and other knowledgeable about the fisheries in the region, including indigenous fisheries. the panel includes sub panels for the American Samoa Archipelago, Hawaii Archipelago, Mariana Archipelago and Pacific Pelagic Ecosystem.
- Regional Ecosystem Advisory Committees (REAC) – The Council receives advice from the American Samoa, Hawaii and Mariana Archipelago REACs. each REAC brings together Council members and representatives from federal, state and local government agencies; businesses; and non-governmental organizations with responsibility and interest in land-based and non-fishing activities that potentially affect the marine ecosystem of the relevant archipelago.
- Other Advisory Bodies – The Council convenes and solicits recommendations from a variety of other committees as warranted, such as its Protected Species Advisory Committee, Social Science Planning Committee, Non-Commercial Advisory Committee, Marine Protected Area Advisory Committee, Hawaii Bottomfish Advisory Review Board (BARB), Marine Planning and Climate Change Committee and Fisheries Data Coordinating Committee.

== Achievements ==
- In 1983, thru the Precious Corals Fishery Management Plan (FMP),
  - the WPRFMC prohibited bottom trawling and other non-discriminatory and destructive coral collection methods throughout the WPRFMC's 1.5 million square mile jurisdiction.
- Also in 1983, the WPRFMC established the Crustacean FMP which helped to pioneer satellite-monitoring of fishing vessels and develop an observer program for on-site collection from commercial vessels.
- In 1984, WPRFMC cohosts the 1st of 3 international marine debris conferences, the 2nd in 2000, the 3rd in 2003. These conferences helped development the Honolulu Derelict Net Recycling Program in 2006
- 1986 WPRFMC establishes Bottomfish & Seamount Groundfish FMP
  - Bottom trawling and other potentially destructive gear banned throughout the Region's entire 1.5 million square nautical miles of EEZ waters.
  - Fishing by large commercial vessels are restricted around Guam, the Commonwealth of the Northern Mariana Islands (CNMI) and Northwestern Hawaiian Islands(NWHI). Seamount groundfish moratorium at Hancock Seamount in NWHI. The WPRFMC instituted limited entry and observers for fishing vessels utilizing the NWHI.
  - The WPRFMC set up quotas for NWHI and main Hawaiian Islands (MHI). Both commercial and non-commercial fishing vessels have to get permits and report catches around the MHI. Vessel monitoring system (VMS) requirements for >40-foot vessels in CNMI.
- 1987 WPRFMC establishes Pelagics FMP. The Pelagics FMP and its later amendments completed the below accomplishments:
  - Drift gillnetting banned throughout the Region's entire 1.5 million square nautical miles of EEZ waters prior to Congress passing the Driftnet Impact Monitoring Assessment & Control Act.
  - Limited entry programs for Hawaii and American Samoa. Spatial management near coastal areas—e.g., Protected Species Zone around the NWHI—to minimize impacts on protected species and user conflicts throughout Region.
  - Automated satellite VMS utilized by WPRFMC, which implements its first application worldwide for fishing vessels.
  - In 2006, Hawaii longline fishery deemed first environmentally responsible longline fishery in the world, using effective sea turtle (circle hooks and mackerel bait) and seabird mitigation (side- and night-setting) methods.
  - Hawaii longline fishery determined to be 94% compliant when evaluated by the UN FAO Code of Conduct for Responsible Fisheries. Longline observer coverage (100% Hawaii swordfish trips, 20% Hawaii tuna trips, 8–10% American Samoa trips).
  - Mandatory closure after 17 loggerhead or 16 leatherback sea turtle interactions for Hawaii longline swordfish fishery.
  - First workshop on South Pacific albacore longline fisheries convened by WPRFMC.
- 1990 Congress includes tunas in Magnuson Act
- 1996 WPRFMC instrumental in achieving amendments to the Magnuson Act to recognize indigenous fishing rights for native peoples and the unique historical, cultural, legal, political, and geographical circumstances of the Pacific Insular Areas and the critical importance of fisheries resources for their economic growth.
- 1997 WPRFMC initiates program to reduce albatross interactions with longline fisheries. Conducted a research project on Hawaii longline vessels to test mitigation techniques. First international black-footed albatross population dynamics workshop convened by WPRFMC. WPRFMC strategic goal of reducing seabird bycatch by over 90 percent achieved.
- 1999 WPRFMC convenes Recreational Fishing Data Task Force to work with State of Hawaii to re-implement the NMFS Recreational Fisheries data survey, which is accomplished in 2002
- Also in 1999, WPRFMC hosts the Fourth Session of the Multilateral High-Level Conference for the Conservation and Management of Highly Migratory Fish Stocks in the Central and Western Pacific Ocean in February.
  - The Fifth Session in September 1999 hosted by WPRFMC.
  - The Sixth Session in April 2000 hosted by WPRFMC.
  - The Seventh and Final Session in August–September 2000 was hosted by WPRFMC, at which time the convention became open for signature. Convention enters into force in June 2004, establishing the Western and Central Pacific Fisheries Commission.
- 2000 WPRFMC adopts international turtle research and mitigation resolution. Its instrumental in the evolution of
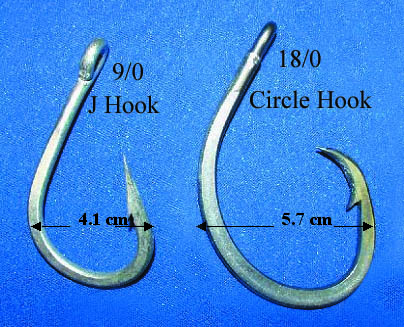
  Hawaii as a center of excellence for developing bycatch solutions for longline and static net fisheries. The WPRFMC develops nesting beach and foraging ground conservation projects in Melanesia, Indonesia, Japan and Mexico for loggerhead and leatherback sea turtles. Instrumental in circle hook exchange program in South American artisanal longline fisheries. International Fishers Forums convened by WPRFMC in Hawaii, Japan and Costa Rica to transfer best practices to reduce bycatch and tackle other issues. Turtle tagging database for Pacific Islands and Southeast Asia developed and maintained through WPRFMC partnership with the Secretariat of the Pacific Regional Environment Programme (originally South Pacific Regional Environment Programme til 2004). The strategic goal of reducing sea turtle bycatch by longline vessels by 90 percent achieved by WPRFMC.
- 2001 The WPRFMC developed an FMP for Coral Reef Ecosystem. It was the first ecosystem plan for fisheries in the US. Destructive and non-selective gears were prohibited. The FMP established no-take and low-take MPAs. It protected NWHI, Marianas, American Samoa and the PRIA marine resources, ensuring near pristine predator-dominated ecosystems prior to establishment of marine monuments.
- 2005 WPRFMC hosts Fisheries Legislation and Community-Based Fisheries Management Workshop, with support from FAO and the Secretariat of the Pacific Community.
- 2006 Congress Reauthorizes Magnuson Act, which includes implementing legislation for WCPFC. Key role of WPRFMC in international fisheries management recognized.
- 2007 WPRFMC approves Fishery Ecosystem Plans (FEPs) shifting management focus from a species-based to a place-based conservation ethic. Regional Ecosystem Advisory Committees were formed on each archipelago to increase participation by communities and agencies not typically involved in fisheries management (e.g., county governments, non-government organizations, businesses, universities and colleges, and the Offices of Samoan, Hawaiian, Chamorro and Carolinian Affairs). Traditional cultural practitioners from throughout Hawaii convened by WPRFMC to discuss establishment of cultural community consultation process with educators and policymakers.
- 2007 WPRFMC convenes International Pacific Marine Educators conference, which launches the International Pacific Marine Educators Network (IPMEN). IPMEN holds successful 2008 conference in Townsville, Australia, and 2010 conference in Fiji. Also in 2007, the WPRFMC implements quota based management program for Main Hawaiian Island “Deep-7” bottomfish fishery requiring complimentary and coordinated Federal and State regulatory changes.
- 2010 WPRFMC establishes annual catch limits (ACLs) for 100 management unit species/species groups/stock complexes.
- 2011 WPRMFC implements a risk-based ACL for the main Hawaiian Islands deepwater bottomfish fishery that includes considerations for management uncertainty and socioeconomic considerations resulting in annual catch target that is less than the ACL.
- 2014 – WPRFMC assisted the Village of Malesso (Merizo) with the development of a community management plan for fishing. This plan, vetted through the community and with the assistance of the local government, provides a placed-based management of resources based on community and historical practices.

== See also ==
- Fisheries management
- Longline bycatch in Hawaii
- North Pacific Fishery Management Council
- U.S. Regional Fishery Management Councils
