= Atlantic Coastal Cooperative Statistics Program =

ACCSP
- Atlantic Coastal Cooperative Statistics Program
- Formation: 1995
- Legal status: State-owned organization
- Purpose: Providing statistics of the USA's Pacific coast
- Location: United States
- Fields: Standards; Administration and outreach; Data collection and management
- Website: https://www.accsp.org/
- Formerly called: Atlantic coast fisheries-dependent program

The Atlantic Coastal Cooperative Statistics Program (ACCSP) is a cooperative state-federal program of U.S. states and the District of Columbia. ACCSP was established to be the principal source of fisheries-dependent information on the Atlantic Coast of the United States.

Initial planning for an Atlantic coast fisheries-dependent program began in 1994 to address deficiencies in the data available for fisheries management along the Atlantic coast. The ACCSP was established in 1995 through a Memorandum of Understanding signed by the 23 state and federal agencies responsible for marine fisheries management on the Atlantic coast.

The federal partners are the United States Fish and Wildlife Service (FWS), National Marine Fisheries Service of the National Oceanic and Atmospheric Administration (NOAA). The state partners are the Maine Department of Marine Resources, New Hampshire Fish and Game Department, Massachusetts Division of Marine Fisheries, Rhode Island Division of Fish and Wildlife, Connecticut Department of Environmental Protection, New York State Department of Environmental Conservation, New Jersey Division of Fish and Wildlife, Delaware Department of Natural Resources, Pennsylvania Fish and Boat Commission, District of Columbia Fisheries and Wildlife, Maryland Department of Natural Resources, Virginia Marine Resources Commission, North Carolina Department of Environment and Natural Resources, South Carolina Department of Natural Resources, Florida Fish and Wildlife Conservation Commission, and Georgia Department of Natural Resources. Other partners include the New England Fishery Management Council, Potomac River Fisheries Commission, Atlantic States Marine Fisheries Commission, South Atlantic Fishery Management Council, and Mid-Atlantic Fishery Management Council.

The Program is separated into three divisions: a staff dedicated to handling the ACCSP standards, administrative aspects and outreach requirements of the program; a data team that seeks to identify, transform and audit datasets and answer data queries regarding fisheries' activities; and a software team that designs and builds the data collection systems for the program manages on behalf of its partners, and internal systems that support Program activities.
