= Mississippi Department of Marine Resources =

- MDMR official logo c.2015
- Company type: State Government
- Industry: Maritime
- Founded: 1994
- Headquarters: 1141 Bayview Avenue, Biloxi, MS, USA
- Area served: Jackson, Harrison, Hancock Counties
- Key people: Joe Spreggins, Executive Director; Rick Burris, Chief Scientific Officer; Charmaine Schmermund, Public Information Officer; Kyle Wilkerson, Chief of Marine Patrol
- Number of employees: 150-201
- Website: www.dmr.ms.gov

The Mississippi Department of Marine Resources (MDMR) is a state agency of Mississippi headquartered in the Eldon Bolton State Office building in Biloxi, Mississippi.

It was created by the legislature as a new state agency in 1994 to manage Mississippi's coastal resources through the authority of the Commission on Marine Resources (CMR). The MDMR is dedicated to enhancing, protecting and conserving the marine interests of Mississippi for present and future generations.

Through the several offices and bureaus composing the MDMR, the agency, together with the CMR, provides public services and plays a role in administering and enforcing Mississippi Seafood Laws, the Mississippi Coastal Wetlands Protection Act, the Public Trust Tidelands Act, the Boat and Water Safety Act, the Derelict Vessel Act, the Non-Point Source Pollution Act, the Magnuson Act, the Wallop-Breaux Sportfish Restoration Act, Marine Litter Act and other state and federal mandates.

== Miss. Advisory Commission on Marine Resources ==
The Mississippi Advisory Commission on Marine Resources has five members, appointed by the governor for four-year terms, to represent the following areas: commercial seafood processors, nonprofit environmental organizations, charter boat operators, recreational fishermen and commercial fishermen. The current members are:

- Ronnie Daniels, Chairman (Harrison County, Charter Boat Operators)
- Natalie Guess, Vice Chairman (Hancock County, Mississippi, Nonprofit Environmental Organizations)
- Cammack (Cam) A. Roberds (Jackson County, Mississippi, Recreational Sports Fishermen)
- Vacant, Commercial Fishermen
- Vacant, Commercial Seafood Processors

== Marine Patrol ==
The Mississippi Marine Patrol is the law enforcement arm of the department. It enforces federal and state marine laws and ordinances made by the Commission on Marine Resources. It operates to protect, preserve and conserve seafood, aquatic life and associated coastal wetland habitats in Mississippi. The Marine Patrol is also responsible for the enforcement of state and federal laws relating to boating safety, and it provides emergency assistance to incidents affecting the marine environment. The Marine Patrol comprises three divisions: Patrol, Administrative and Investigative.

== Corruption ==
In 2014, the previous director of the agency, Bill Walker, was convicted of public corruption and sentenced to five years in prison. Under Walker's leadership, the DMR spent almost $1.4 million on recreational fishing boats leased from Walker's private foundation. A former DMR employee said Walker used the boats 95 percent of the time for entertainment.
