= EFH =

EFH may refer to:

- EF Hutton, an American stock brokerage firm
- Energy Future Holdings, an American electric utility
- Essential fish habitat
