= Bank of Ocean City =

The Bank of Ocean City is a community bank headquartered in Ocean City, Maryland, established in 1916 to serve the local economy, including the tourism and fishing industries. It operates seven branches across Maryland and Delaware, serving areas such as Ocean City, Berlin, Fenwick Island, and Selbyville. The bank has expanded its operations and donated its original building for use by the Ocean City Life-Saving Station Museum.

== History ==
The Bank of Ocean City began operations on January 3, 1916, in Ocean City, Maryland. The idea for a local bank emerged in 1914, but the first application to establish the State Bank of Ocean City was withdrawn. A second attempt in 1915 succeeded after a protracted regulatory process. The incorporators—Levin D. Lynch, John M. Mumford, William B. S. Powell, Thomas W. Taylor, and Charles T. Jackson—secured approval from the Maryland State Bank Commissioner on the condition that a proposed associate, Paul Clark, would not be involved in the bank's management due to his controversial financial history. The bank opened with an initial capital of US$20,000 (equivalent to $591,743 in 2025).

The bank was located in the McGregor Building, a two-story structure at the corner of Dorchester Street and Baltimore Avenue. It shared space with other businesses, including a general store and a butcher shop. The bank primarily served Ocean City's fishing industry and the seasonal influx of summer visitors.

The Bank of Ocean City faced its first major challenge during the Great Depression. In October 1931, it temporarily closed due to declining deposits and losses from bond investments. After raising additional capital and limiting withdrawals for 90 days, the bank reopened in November 1931. It weathered another closure in March 1933 during the national "bank holiday" declared by U.S. president Franklin D. Roosevelt but resumed operations without restrictions shortly thereafter. After World War II, the bank modernized its facilities, including renovations in 1947 that added a brick façade, modern teller desks, and a new vault.

In the 1970s, the bank opened a branch at 59th Street. Additional branches followed, including a location in West Ocean City, Maryland in 1976, initially housed in a temporary trailer before a permanent structure was completed in 1981. By the late 1980s, the bank had established a branch in North Ocean City, repurposing a location vacated by another bank. Expansion continued in 2007 with the opening of a branch in Berlin, Maryland, on the site of a former restaurant.

The bank entered Delaware in 2016, relocating its North Ocean City branch to Fenwick Island to better serve the tourism-driven market. In 2023, it planned to further expand into Selbyville, Delaware, with a 1,700-square-foot branch aimed at meeting the needs of residents commuting between Sussex County, Delaware and Ocean City.

== Branch network and properties ==
The McGregor Building, the bank's original location, was central to its early operations. This structure, situated at Dorchester Street and Baltimore Avenue, was originally built by Charles McGregor as a general store and apartment building. The Bank of Ocean City occupied one of its commercial spaces when it began operations in 1916. Over the decades, the building changed hands multiple times, with the bank acquiring full ownership in 1986. It was subdivided into two parcels, and while the bank continued operations there, the other section housed commercial tenants.

In 2019, the bank ceased operations at the Dorchester Street location. It was donated to the Town of Ocean City to be repurposed as additional exhibit space for the Ocean City Life-Saving Station Museum.

The Bank of Ocean City expanded its physical footprint in response to the growing needs of the local and regional population. The West Ocean City branch, established in 1976, initially operated from a temporary trailer before transitioning to a brick and mortar building in 1981. The Berlin branch, opened in 2007, was located across from Atlantic General Hospital.

The move into Delaware began with the relocation of the North Ocean City branch to Fenwick Island in 2016, targeting a community closely tied to Ocean City’s economy. The forthcoming Selbyville branch, scheduled to open in 2023, reflects the bank's focus on serving residents of eastern Sussex County who commute to Ocean City. This new branch is part of the Mason Dixon Shopping Center off U.S. Route 113. The opening ceremony took place on June 1, 2023.
