= Magnuson-Stevens Act Provisions; National Standard Guidelines =

The Magnuson-Stevens Act includes provisions that is necessary to help assure compliance to end and prevent overfishing, rebuild overfished stocks, and achieve maximum yield

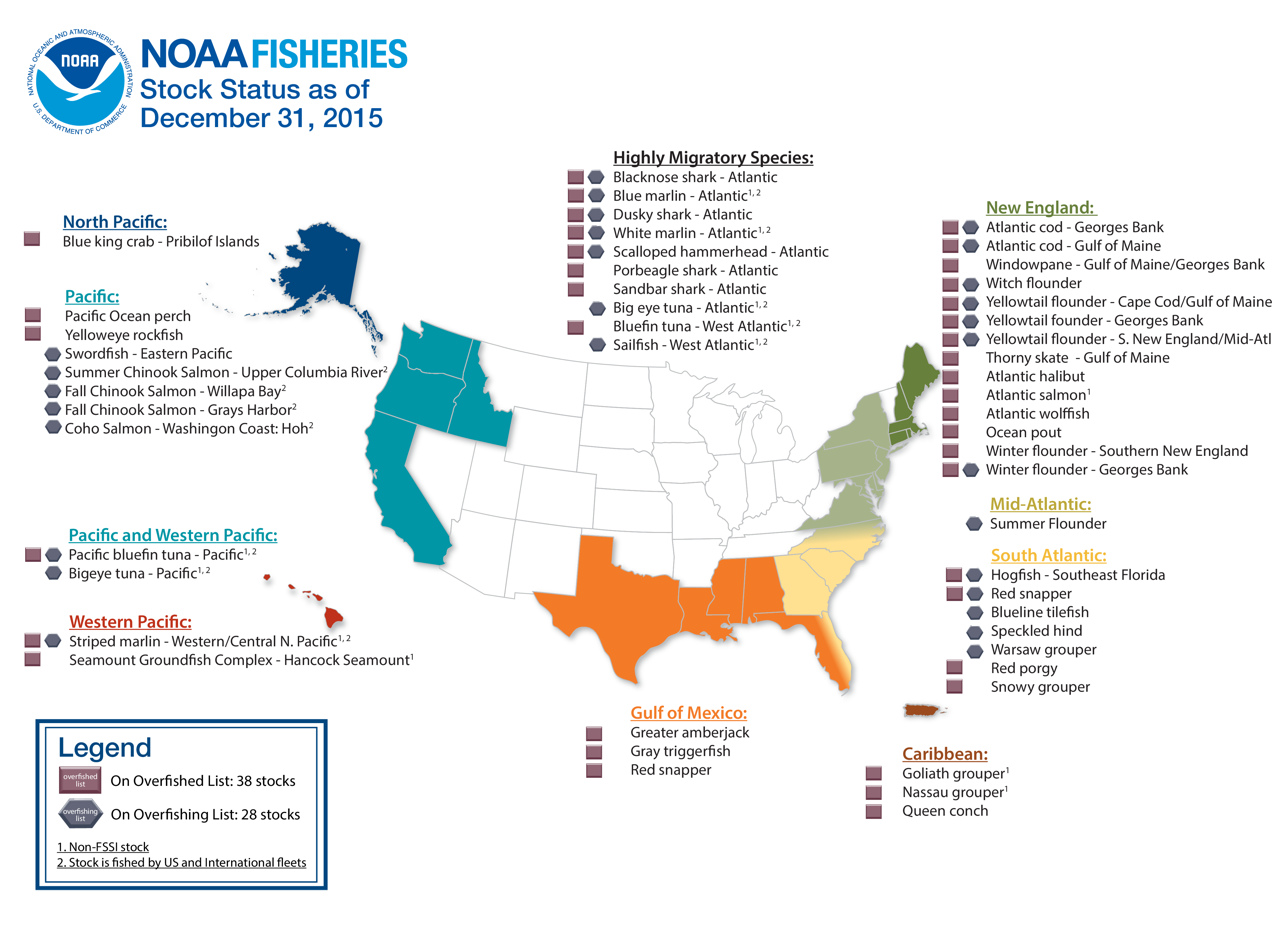
NOAA Fisheries stock status of 2015

== Background ==
In 2006, the Magnuson-Stevens Fishery Conservation and Management Reauthorization Act was established to end and prevent overfishing though the use of annual catch limits and accountability measurements. Some reasons for why the Magnuson-Stevens Fishery Conservation and Management Reauthorization act was created was because of:

- A handful of fish stocks has declined to the point of their survival being threatened
- To make it possible for small fishing companies to compete with massive fishing fleets
- Failure to prevent or terminate overfishing of the International fishery agreement
- To provide optimal yields on a continuing basis to preserve and maintain fisheries

== National Standard 1 - Optimum Yield ==
The National Standard 1 pertains:

- Providing Stability for Fisheries
- Adding Flexibility to rebuilding plans
- Updating optimal yield and maximum sustainable yield concepts
- Improving guidance on managing data-limit stocks
- Consolidating guidance on identifying stocks to be included in federal fishery management plans
- Provisions to further advance ecosystem-based fisheries management

== National Standard 2 - Scientific Information ==
The counsel may decide to allow this type of overfishing if the fishery is not overfished and if all of the following lower conditions are satisfied:

- Such action will result in longterm net benefits to the Nation
- Mitigating measures have been considered and it has been demonstrated that a similar level of longterm net benefits cannot be achieved by modifying fleet behavior, gear selection/configuration, or other technical characteristic in a manner such that no overfishing would occur
- The resulting rate of fishing mortality will not cause any stock or stock complex to fall below its MSST more than 50 percent of the time in the long term, although it is recognized that persistent overfishing is expected to cause the affected stock to fall below its Bmsy more than 50 percent of the time in the long term.

== National Standard 3 - Management Units ==
The SAFE report provides information to the Councils for determining annual harvest levels for each stock. To the extent practicable, an individual stock of fish shall be managed as a unit throughout its range, and interrelated stocks of fish shall be managed as a unit or in close coordination. National Standard 3 is to induce a comprehensive approach to fishery management. The geographic scope of the fishery, for planning purposes, should cover the entire range of the stocks of fish and to not be overly constrained by Political boundaries. Whenever possible, a Fishery Management Plan should manage interrelated stocks of fish.

== National Standard 4 - Allocations ==
Defined by National Oceanic and Atmospheric Administration's (NOAA) National Marine Fisheries Service (NMFS), Allocation is "a direct and deliberate distribution of the opportunity to participate in a fishery among identifiable, discrete user groups or individuals"

National Standard 4 pertains to the conservation and management measures avoiding discrimination between residents of different states. If it is or becomes necessary to assign fishing privileges among various U.S. fishermen, such allocation shall be:

1. Fair and equitable to all such fishermen
2. Reasonably calculated to promote conservation
3. Managed in a manner that no particular individual, corporation or other entity squires an excessive share of such privileges

A Fishery Management Plan may not differentiate amount U.S. citizens, nationals, resident aliens, or corporations on the basis of their state or residence.

== National Standard 5 - Efficiency ==
Conservation and Management measures shall, where practicable, consider efficiency in the utilization of fishery resources; except that no measure shall have economic allocation of its sole purpose. The term "utilization", is meant to be interpreted as; harvesting, processing, marketing, and nonconsumptive use of the resource. In theory, an efficient fishery would harvest the optimal yield with the minimum use of economic inputs as labor, capital, interest and fuel.

This standard highlights one process that a fishery can/should contribute to the planet's benefit with a low effect society:

- Given a set of objectives for the fishery, a Fishery Management Plan should contain management measures that result in as efficient a fishery as is practicable or desirable.

Another efficient Fishery Management Plan includes:

- Management Plan that allows a fishery to manage at the lowest cost possible (e.g., fishing effort, administration and enforcement) for a particular level of catch and initial size

== National Standard 6 - Variations and Contingencies ==
Conservation and management measures shall take into account and allow for variations among, and contingencies in, fisheries, fishery resources, and catch. The phrase "Conservation and management" implies the wise use of fishery resources through a management plan that includes some protection against the following uncertainties: Timely respond to resource, industry, and other national and regional needs.

Fishery Management Plans should consist of a suitable impact in favor of conservation. Allowances for uncertainties should be factored into the backbone of a Fishery Management Plan. Examples include:

- Reduce optimal yield from lack of information of a stock
- Establish a reserve as the creation of a reserve may include uncertainties in estimating domestic harvest, stock conditions, or environmental factors
- Adjust management techniques as a council could guard against producing drastic changes in fishing patterns, allocations, or practices
- Highlight habitat conditions as knowing the original habitat condition can help address the impacts of pollution and habitat degradation
- Contingencies can establish a flexible management plan that contains a range of management options for unpredicted events (e.g., unexpected resource surges or failures, fishing effort greater than expected, disruptive gear conflicts)

== National Standard 7 - Costs and Benefits ==
Conservation and management measures shall, where practicable, minimize costs and avoid unnecessary duplication. The Magnuson-Stevens Act requires Councils to prepare Fishery Management Plans for overfished fisheries and for other fisheries where regulation will be beneficial according to cost whether its in the present or future.

The following factors shall be considered, among others to implement a Fishery Management Plan:

- The importance of fishery to the Nation and to the regional economy
- The condition of the stock or stocks of fish and whether a Fishery Management Plan can improve or maintain that condition
- The extent to which the fishery could be or is already adequately managed by states, by state/Federal programs, by Federal regulations pursuant to Fishery Management Plans or inter nation commissions, or by industry self-regulation, consistent with the policies and standards of the Magnuson-Stevens Act.
- The need to resolve competing interests and conflicts among user groups and whether a Fishery Management Plan can further that resolution
- The economic condition of a fishery and whether a Fishery Management Plan can produce more efficient utilization
- The needs of a developing fishery, and whether a Fishery Management Plan can foster orderly growth
- The costs associated with a Fishery Management Plan, balanced against the benefits

== National Standard 8 - Communities ==
Conservation and Management measures shall, consistent with the conservation requirements with the Magnuson-Stevens Act (including the prevention of overfishing and rebuilding of overfished stocks), take into account the importance of fishery resources to fishing communities by utilizing economic and social data that are based upon the best scientific information available in order to:

1. Provide for the sustained participation of such communities; and
2. To the extent practicable, minimize adverse economic impacts on such communities.

This standard is meant to take into account the importance of fishery resources to fishing communities from a Fishery Management Plan. This consideration, however, is within the context of the conservation requirements of the Magnuson-Stevens Act. Careful consideration regarding the importance of fishery resources to affected fishing communities, thus, must not compromise the achievement of conservation requirements and goals of the Fishery Management Plan.

== National Standard 9 - Bycatch ==
Conservation and management measures shall, to the extent practicable:

1. Minimize bycatch; and
2. To the extent by catch cannot be avoided, minimize the mortality of such bycatch.

The term "bycatch" is to be interpreted as fish that are harvested in a fishery, but are not sold or kept for personal use.

National Standard 9 requires Councils to consider the bycatch effects of existing and planned conservation and management measures. Bycatch may delay or prevent efforts to protect marine ecosystems, efforts to achieve sustainable fisheries and delay or prevent the full benefits they may provide to the Nation.

Bycatch can increase substantially the uncertainty concerning total fishing-related mortality, which increases difficulty to assess the status of stocks, to set the appropriate Optimal Yield and define overfishing levels. and to ensure that Optimal Yields are attained and overfishing levels are not exceeded. Bycatch may also preclude other more productive uses of fishery resources.

== National Standard 10 - Safety of Life at Sea ==
Conservation and management measures shall, to the extent practicable, promote the safety of human life at sea. National Standard 10 promotes Councils to reduce the risk in crafting their management measures. If the management measures can meet the other national standards and the legal and practical requirements of conservation and management then there should be no problem. This standard is not meant to give preference to one method of managing a fishery over another.

Non-inclusive list of safety considerations that shall be considered in evaluating management measures under national standard 10:

1. Operating environment shall be put into consideration of a Fishing Management Plan that should try to avoid creating situations resulting in vessels going out further, fishing longer, or fishing in weather worse than if there were no management measures.
2. Gear and vessel loading requirements shall be put into consideration of a Fishing Management Plan that should consider the safety and stability of fishing vessels when required specific gear or requiring the removal of gear from the water.
3. Limited season and area fisheries shall be put into consideration of a Fishing Management Plan that should attempt to reduce the impacts of fishermen fishing in bad weather and overlaid their vessel with catch and/or gear.
