= North Pacific Fishery Management Council =

The North Pacific Fishery Management Council (NPFMC) is one of eight regional councils established by the Magnuson–Stevens Fishery Conservation and Management Act in 1976 to manage the fisheries of the United States. With jurisdiction over the 900,000-square-mile (2,300,000 km^{2}) Exclusive Economic Zone (EEZ) off Alaska, the Council has primary responsibility for groundfish management in the Gulf of Alaska, Bering Sea and Aleutian Islands, including cod, pollock, flatfish, mackerel, sablefish, and rockfish species. Other large Alaska fisheries such as salmon, crab and herring are managed primarily by the State of Alaska.

== Community Development Program Quotas ==
The Western Alaska Community Development Quota (CDQ) Program was created by the Council in 1992 to provide western Alaska communities an opportunity to participate in the Bering Sea and Aleutian Islands (BSAI) fisheries that had been foreclosed to them because of the high capital investment needed to enter the fishery. The purpose of the CDQ Program is to:

- to provide eligible western Alaska villages with the opportunity to participate and invest in fisheries in the Bering Sea and Aleutian Islands Management Area
- support economic development in western Alaska
- alleviate poverty and provide economic and social benefits for residents of western Alaska
- achieve sustainable and diversified local economies in western Alaska

== Habitat protection ==
An ecosystem-oriented management approach is being used to preserve the productivity of fishery resources in the ocean habitat. Habitats such as corals are important for food, reproduction, and shelter for certain fish. Other structural habitats include boulders, sea anemones, and kelps. There are many activities that could destroy these underwater habitats. This is why in various areas of the North Pacific, activities such as groundfish trawling and scallop dredging have been banned; moreover, these areas have become marine reserves on the continental shelf.

All fishery management plans include a description and identification of essential fish habitat, adverse impacts, and actions to conserve and enhance habitat; furthermore, maps of essential fish habitat areas are useful for understanding potential effects of proposed development and other activities.

== Aleutian Islands Fishery Ecosystem Plan (AI FEP) ==
The Aleutian Islands are chain of rugged volcanic islands of southwest Alaska curving about 1,931 km (1,200 mi) west from the Alaska Peninsula and separating the Bering Sea from the Pacific Ocean. These islands came under the United States control once Alaska was purchased in 1867. Since then the islands are the site of U.S. military bases and research stations.

The importance of the islands and an extremely unpredictable weather pattern, prompted the NPFMC's creation of the Aleutian Islands Fishery Ecosystem Plan (AI FEP), which serves as a strategic policy and planning document to guide the Council in its management actions relating to the Aleutian Islands. The FEP is intended to be an educational tool and resource that can provide the Council with both an ‘early warning system,’ and an ecosystem context for fishery management decisions affecting the Aleutian Islands area.

== Alaska Marine Ecosystem Forum ==
Alaska Marine Ecosystem Forum is formed by Councils signing a Memorandum of Understanding with 10 federal agencies and 4 state agencies. The purpose of the forum is to establish cooperation among the agencies, in order to understand the issues related to marine ecosystems off Alaska's coast. The forum also designed to improve the sharing of data between agencies.

== Protected species ==
Marine mammals, seabirds, and other species in the Arctic region are affected by excess fishing.

Protected Species: The adverse effects of fishing in these areas have caused higher death rates in these species, which has led to ecological imbalance. To combat this dilemma, the NPFMC and the NOAA Fisheries Service has tried to minimize the interactions of the fishermen and the animals; furthermore, the local fishing industry has also collaborated with the Council to help achieve the objective.

== Non targeted species management ==
During fishing trips, fishermen collect their intended species along with unintended or non-targeted species. The Council is working with the BSAI and the GOA Groundfish FMPs to create guidelines for the management of groundfish groups and species that are considered to be vulnerable to the adverse effects of overfishing. The animals are ranked for management priority based on complexes, groups, and then species.

== Bycatch controls ==
Even though fishermen try only to target specific species, it is impossible for the catch to consist 100% of the selected fish. Non-targeted organisms are also caught, and this is considered bycatch. Bycatch is not kept to sell or for personal use, and is supposed to be discarded back into the sea.

Bycatch controls are applied to the following groups:

- Salmon Bycatch
- Bering Sea Chinook Bycatch
- Bering Sea Chum Bycatch
- Gulf of Alaska Salmon Bycatch
- Crab Bycatch
- BSAI Crab Bycatch
- Gulf of Alaska Crab Bycatch
- BSAI/GOA Halibut Bycatch

== Fishery Management Plans ==
The Council endorses a Fishery Management Plan that corresponds to groundfish, crab, salmon, scallop, etc. The Arctic region contains a very fragile ecosystem. Factors such as prolonged ice-free seasons and increasing water temperatures could have unforeseen effects on the environment. This is why the region is being monitored more frequently and adequately than before.

In 2009, the Council's new management plan was developed under the power of the U.S. Magnuson-Stevens Fishery Conservation and Management Act. This newly developed plan states that finfish, mollusks, crustaceans, and other marine animals are not open to commercial fishing. However the management plan does not have precedence over recreational fishing or Alaska-monitored fisheries in the Arctic region. The NOAA pushed for the prohibition of commercial fishing in the arctic region until research of the region can prove that a fishery is sustainable. Moreover, commercial activities regarding marine mammals and birds are not regulated by this plan.

== See also ==
- Magnuson–Stevens Fishery Conservation and Management Act
- U.S. Regional Fishery Management Councils
- Western Pacific Regional Fishery Management Council
