= U.S. Regional Fishery Management Councils =

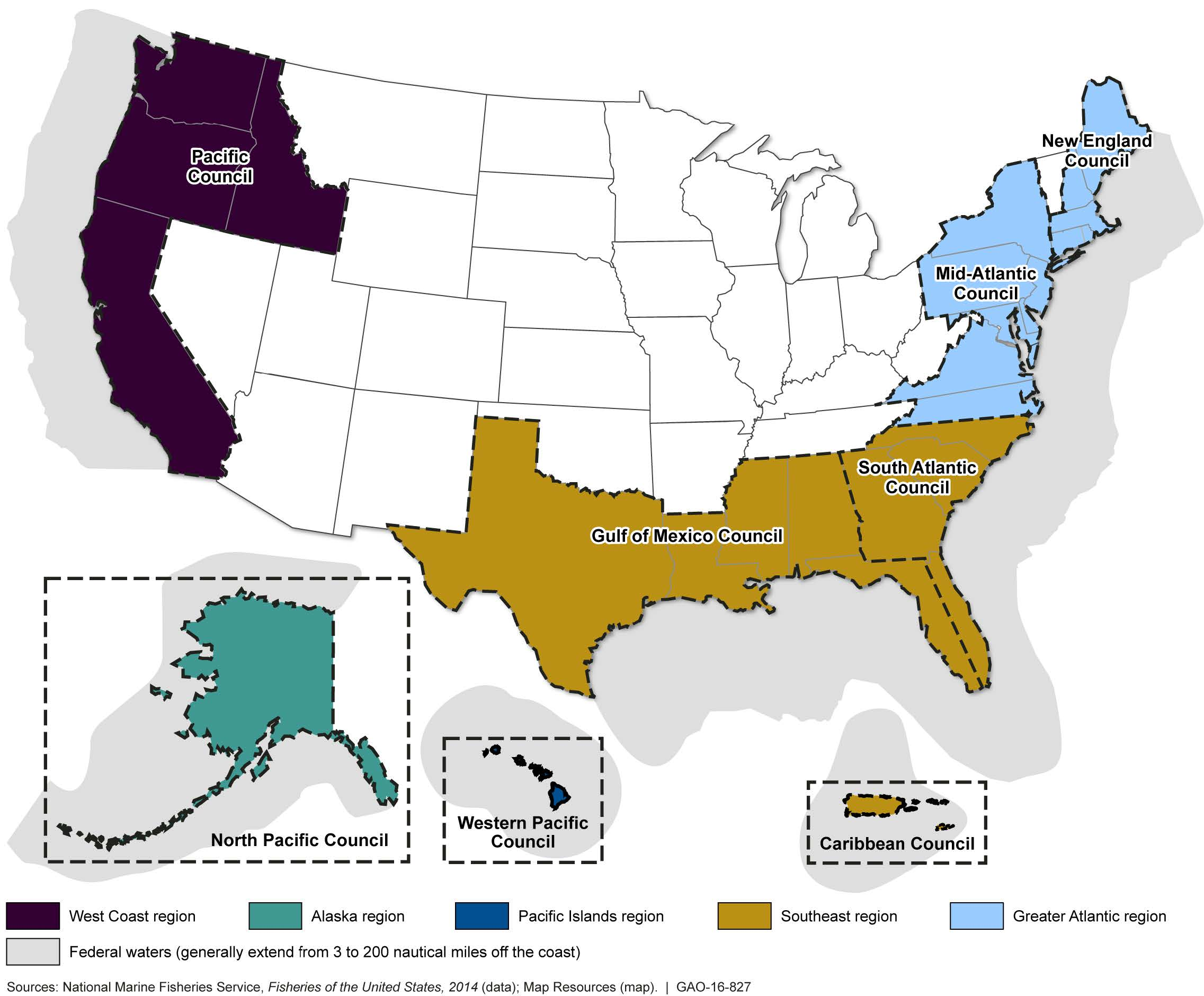
A map of the area managed by each U.S. regional fisheries management councils. This map excludes the Mariana Islands archipelago, American Samoa, and a range of remote island areas in the central and western Pacific which are under the jurisdiction of the Western Pacific Council.

The eight U.S. regional fishery management councils are the primary forums for developing conservation and management measures for U.S. marine fisheries. The regional councils recommend management measures for fisheries in the exclusive economic zone (EEZ); which are subject to approval and implemented by the National Marine Fisheries Service (NMFS). The councils were established by the Magnuson–Stevens Fishery Conservation and Management Act in 1976. In 1996, revisions to the laws governing the regional fishery management councils were made by the Sustainable Fisheries Act, which includes provisions to reduce bycatch, consider the effects of management decisions on communities, and protect essential fish habitats.

The councils are composed of individuals with a stake in the fishery. This includes federal and state officials, primarily from the NMFS and the Fish and Wildlife Service. Additionally, councils have at-large and obligatory members selected by state governors to represent non-government stakeholders and special interests such as commercial fishermen, fisheries scientists, and charter boat owners.

U.S. Regional Fishery Management Councils
Regional council	Note
Western Pacific	The Western Pacific Regional Fishery Management Council’s jurisdiction includes the U.S. exclusive economic zone (EEZ) waters (generally 3–200 miles offshore) around the State of Hawaii; U.S. territories of American Samoa and Guam; the Commonwealth of the Northern Mariana Islands (CNMI); and the U.S. Pacific remote island areas of Johnston, Midway, Palmyra and Wake Atolls; Baker, Howland and Jarvis Islands; and Kingman Reef. This area of nearly 1.5 million square miles is the size of the continental United States and constitutes about half of the entire U.S. EEZ. It spans both sides of the equator and both sides of the dateline. The Council also manages domestic fisheries based in the U.S. Pacific Islands that operate on the high seas.
North Pacific	The North Pacific Fishery Management Council (NPFMC) is one of eight regional councils established by the Magnuson Fishery Conservation and Management Act in 1976 to manage the fisheries of the US. With jurisdiction over the 900,000-square-mile (2,300,000 km2) exclusive economic zone (EEZ) off Alaska, the Council has primary responsibility for groundfish management in the Gulf of Alaska, Bering Sea and Aleutian Islands, including cod, pollock, flatfish, mackerel, sablefish, and rockfish species. Other large Alaska fisheries such as salmon, crab and herring are managed primarily by the State of Alaska.
Pacific	Develops regulations for fisheries in the U.S. exclusive economic zone (EEZ) off Washington, Oregon, and California. This area of ocean is also known as the California Current Large Marine Ecosystem.
Gulf of Mexico	Prepares fishery management plans for the exclusive economic zone (EEZ) in the Gulf of Mexico. The Gulf of Mexico Fishery Management Council (Gulf Council) consists of 17 voting members: the Southeast Regional Administrator of the National Marine Fisheries Service (NMFS), the directors of the five Gulf state marine resource management agencies (Texas, Louisiana, Mississippi, Alabama, and Florida), and 11 members who are nominated by the state governors, and appointed by the United States secretary of commerce. The Gulf Council currently has 10 fishery management plans that set management parameters for: Coastal Migratory Pelagics, Red Drum, Reef Fish, Shrimp, Spiny Lobster, Florida Stone Crab, Coral and Coral Reefs, Essential Fish Habitat, Aquaculture, and generic amendments in the EEZ of the Gulf of Mexico.
New England	The New England council develops fisheries management plans for the exclusive economic zone (EEZ) off the coasts of Maine, New Hampshire, Massachusetts, Rhode Island, and Connecticut. There are 18 voting members and 4 non-voting members in total. The first member is the NOAA Fisheries Regional Administrator of the Greater Atlantic Region, they serve as the federal representative. The next 5 members are the directors of the marine fishery management programs in each state. The remaining 12 members are nominated by the governors of each state. There are currently 9 fisheries management plans (FMPs) enacted in the New England region. They focus primarily on economically and historically valuable fisheries such as Groundfish and Sea Scallop.
Mid-Atlantic	The Mid-Atlantic council is responsible for the 3-200 mile exclusive economic zone (EEZ) off the coasts of New York, New Jersey, Pennsylvania, Delaware, Maryland, Virginia, and North Carolina. One of the largest councils, there are 21 voting members and 4 non-voting members. Since the Mid-Atlantic council has seven states there are seven state representatives consisting of either the head of state marine fisheries management program or related designee. Additionally, there are 13 private citizens appointed by the governors of their states. The Mid-Atlantic council has Fisheries Management Plans involving multiple species at a time. First, is the Summer Flounder, Scup, and Black Sea Bass FMP which successfully rebuilt the Black Sea Bass fishery. Second, is the Atlantic Mackerel, Squid, and Butterfish FMP. Third, is the Surfclams and Ocean Quahogs FMP which was the first plan in the United States to introduce Individual Transferable Quotas (ITQ). Finally, the Mid-Atlantic council manages Bluefish and Tilefish. The Monkfish and Spiny Dogfish fisheries management plans are actually a collaborative effort between the Mid-Atlantic and New England councils.
South Atlantic	The South Atlantic Council maintains the fisheries management plans in North Carolina, South Carolina, Georgia, and Florida. They are responsible for the fishing within the 3-200 mile exclusive economic zone (EEZ) and must account for the boundary interaction with Bermuda, Cuba, and the Bahamas. The council is made up of only 13 voting members and 4 non-voting members making it one of the smallest councils. Despite being one of the smallest councils, the South Atlantic has 8 Fisheries Management Plans. They primarily focus on economically valuable fisheries like the Rock Shrimp fishery. Additionally, they have Coral and Sargassum plans unlike other councils which only have fish plans or an overarching habitat plan.
Caribbean	The Caribbean Council represents the Commonwealth of Puerto Rico and the U.S. Virgin Islands. They are the smallest council with only seven voting members and 3 non-voting members. The Fisheries management plans of the Caribbean region are primarily reef dwellers including reef fish, corals, and reef associated invertebrates. Queen Conch and Spiny Lobster are vital, economically important species in the region so they each have their own FMPs.

== See also ==
- Fisheries management
- North Pacific Fishery Management Council
- Western Pacific Regional Fishery Management Council
