= Sustainable Fisheries Act of 1996 =

1996 US fishery law

- Long title: An Act to amend the Magnuson Fishery Conservation and Management Act to authorize appropriations, to provide for sustainable fisheries, and for other purposes.
- Acronyms (colloquial): SFA; FFA
- Nicknames: Fisheries Financing Act
- Enacted by: the 104th United States Congress
- Effective: October 11, 1996

Citations
- Public law: 104-297
- Statutes at Large: 110 Stat. 3559

Codification
- Titles amended: 16 U.S.C.: Conservation
- U.S.C. sections amended: 16 U.S.C. ch. 38, subch. II § 1812; 16 U.S.C. ch. 38, subch. III §§ 1821, 1822, 1823, 1824, 1826; 16 U.S.C. ch. 38, subch. IV §§ 1851, 1852, 1853, 1854, 1855, 1856, 1857, 1858, 1860, 1861, 1861a, 1862, 1863; 16 U.S.C. ch. 38, subch. V §§ 1881, 1881a, 1881b, 1881c, 1881d, 1882, 1883

Legislative history
- Introduced in the Senate as S. 39 by Ted Stevens (R–AK) on January 4, 1995; Committee consideration by Senate Commerce, Science, and Transportation, House Resources; Passed the Senate on September 19, 1996 (Roll call vote 295, via Senate.gov 100-0); Passed the House on September 27, 1996 (Roll call vote 448, via Clerk.House.gov 384-30); Signed into law by President Bill Clinton on October 11, 1996

The Sustainable Fisheries Act of 1996 is an amendment to the Magnuson-Stevens Fishery Conservation and Management Act, a law governing the management of marine fisheries in the United States. Another major amendment to this legislation was later made under the Magnuson-Stevens Fishery Conservation and Management Reauthorization Act of 2006. The SFA was enacted to amend the outdated MSFCMA of 1976. The amendment included changes to the purpose of the act, definitions, and international affairs, as well as many small changes.

The U.S. Senate bill S. 39 was passed by the 104th United States Congressional session and enacted into law by the 42nd President of the United States Bill Clinton on October 11, 1996.

== Purpose ==
There were several major changes to the purpose of the law:

1. Prohibiting fisheries managers from using social, economic, or any other justifications to allow catch targets to exceed a calculated "maximum sustainable yield."
2. Mandating that for each managed species, fisheries managers quantitatively define "overfishing" (certain specified maximum allowed rates of fishing mortality) and "overfished" (depletion below a certain population level).
3. Mandating regular assessment of which fish populations that are overfished, and creating an official list of overfished species in U.S. waters.
4. Mandating that for overfished species, plans must be enacted allowing them to recover to quantitatively specified target population levels (usually about one-third of the estimated pre-fishing population) within ten years (with certain exceptions).
5. Adding that catches of unintended species or unmarketable fish be reduced, to the extent practicable.
6. Adding the promotion of protection of "Essential Fish Habitat."
7. Adding the promotion of catch and release programs to conservation and management principles.

== Definitions ==
The following terms which became relevant in the twenty years following the original act were added:

- bycatch
- charter fishing
- commercial fishing
- economic discards
- essential fish habitat
- fishing community
- individual fishing quota
- optimum yield
- overfishing (overfished)
- Pacific Insular Area
- recreational fishing
- regulatory discards
- special areas
- vessel subject to the jurisdiction of the United States

== International affairs ==
Besides establishing the Pacific Insular Area fishery agreement regulations, the SFA directs the Secretary of State to "seek to secure an international agreement to establish standards and measures for bycatch reduction that are comparable to the standards and measures applicable to United States fishermen."
