= National Marine Fisheries Service =

Office of the U.S. National Oceanic and Atmospheric Administration

Agency overview
- Formed: 1970; 56 years ago
- Jurisdiction: United States Department of Commerce
- Headquarters: Silver Spring, Maryland, US; 38°59′32.1″N 77°01′50.3″W
- Employees: 4,200 (2019)
- Annual budget: US$1.027 billion (2019)
- Agency executive: Emily Menashes, Acting Assistant Administrator for Fisheries
- Parent agency: National Oceanic and Atmospheric Administration
- Website: fisheries.noaa.gov

The National Marine Fisheries Service (NMFS), informally known as NOAA Fisheries, is a United States federal agency within the U.S. Department of Commerce's National Oceanic and Atmospheric Administration (NOAA) that is responsible for the stewardship of U.S. national marine resources. It conserves and manages fisheries to promote sustainability and prevent lost economic potential associated with overfishing, declining species, and degraded habitats.

== History ==
Founded in 1871 as the U.S. Commission of Fish and Fisheries, the National Marine Fisheries Service is the oldest federal conservation and environmental research agency in the United States. The commission was formed when President Ulysses S. Grant named zoologist Spencer Fullerton Baird, United States National Museum director and assistant secretary of the Smithsonian Institution, the first commissioner of the United States Fish Commission.

The commission was divided into three research categories: the study of U.S. waters and fish and its biological problems, the study of past and present fishing methods and collection of fish catch and trade statistics, and the introduction and propagation of food fishes throughout the nation. This structure remained through the transition of the commission's placement within the U.S. Commerce Department's National Oceanic and Atmospheric Administration (NOAA), in 1970.

=== U.S. Fish Commission placement within NOAA ===
Initially the commission investigated the reasons for an apparent decline in fish stocks along the shores of southern New England and recommended regulatory measures. The commission also conducted broad, scientific surveys and collections of marine species from scientific research vessels, initially in Northeast Atlantic coastal and deep-sea waters and then in the Mid-Atlantic and South Atlantic, the Gulf of Mexico, and off the coasts of Mexico, Texas, Florida, and Cuba. The commission's scientists collected marine invertebrate and fish species, made hydrographic surveys, and studied fish populations.

In 1903, the U.S. Fish Commission was reorganized and named the Bureau of Fisheries. In 1939, the Bureau of Fisheries and its functions were transferred to the United States Department of the Interior. The Bureau of Fisheries merged with the Bureau of Biological Survey in 1940 to become the Fish and Wildlife Service, still under the U.S. Department of the Interior. In 1956, the Fish and Wildlife Service underwent a reorganization and became the United States Fish and Wildlife Service. The 1956 reorganization established two components of the U.S. Fish and Wildlife Service: The Bureau of Commercial Fisheries, which focused primarily on commercial fisheries, whales, seals, and sea lions; and the Bureau of Sport Fisheries and Wildlife, which focused on migratory birds, game management, wildlife refuges, sport fisheries, and sea mammals, excluding those managed under the Bureau of Commercial Fisheries.

In 1970, President Richard Nixon transferred the Bureau of Commercial Fisheries and almost all its functions from the U.S. Fish and Wildlife Service to the Department of Commerce. Simultaneous with its transfer, the office was renamed the National Marine Fisheries Service. It was placed under the control of NOAA, which was created as a component of the Department of Commerce on October 3, 1970, primarily through a reorganization of the Environmental Science Services Administration, which NOAA replaced.

== Fisheries management ==
NOAA Fisheries regulates commercial and recreational marine fishing in the United States under the Magnuson-Stevens Fishery Conservation and Management Act (MSA). Established in 1976, the MSA is the primary law governing marine fisheries conservation and management in U.S. federal waters. NOAA Fisheries is responsible for fisheries management of waters in the U.S. Exclusive Economic Zone, typically 3–200 miles from land. NOAA Fisheries manages 461 stocks or stock complexes in 46 fishery management plans, using stock assessments to determine their status. Under the MSA, fisheries management decisions in the United States are made primarily by eight regional fishery management councils. These councils may include representatives from state government agencies, academia, the fishing industry and environmental nonprofits, as well as representatives from NOAA Fisheries. These councils serve as regulatory advisors that make region-specific recommendations to NOAA Fisheries, who implements the regulations.

The MSA was reauthorized and revised in 2007 to include annual catch limits to end overfishing. Overfishing, which NOAA Fisheries is tasked with preventing, is a major threat to biodiversity, global food security, and the fishing sector.

The MSA also requires that overfished stocks be rebuilt within 10 years, except in cases where the life history characteristics of the stock, environmental conditions or management measures under an international agreement dictate otherwise. Fisheries managers use stock assessments to help determine if a stock is overfished, measuring the maximum sustainable yield. If a stock is designated as overfished, annual catch limits need to be low enough to allow stocks to rebuild. Worldwide, about one-third of fish stocks are being fished at biologically unsustainable levels. NOAA Fisheries has been successful at ending overfishing in U.S. waters, and science-based management has resulted in 47 once-overfished U.S. fish stocks being declared rebuilt. In July 2020, NOAA Fisheries published a report showing that the number of U.S. fish stocks subject to overfishing was at an all-time low in 2019—93 percent were not subject to overfishing.

=== Illegal, unreported, and unregulated fishing ===
NOAA Fisheries works with U.S. government agencies and foreign governments to implement domestic and international policies and plans for addressing illegal, unreported, and unregulated (IUU) fishing in United States waters and internationally. NOAA Fisheries works with the United States Department of State to evaluate international fisheries and identify vessels that have engaged in IUU fishing activities. If a nation is identified to have involvement in IUU fishing, NOAA Fisheries and the Department of State initiate a two-year consultation process to encourage that nation to take necessary measures to address the specific issue. NOAA Fisheries then determines whether to negatively or positively certify the identified nation in its next biennial report to Congress on international fisheries. If the nation can provide evidence that it has taken actions that address the IUU issue(s), a positive certification is issued. A negative certification may result in that nation's fishing vessels losing U.S. port access and potential import restrictions on fish or fish products.

In 2017, the Seafood Import Monitoring Program was established under NOAA Fisheries to increase transparency and traceability for 13 species of seafood particularly vulnerable to IUU fishing. Greater transparency and traceability helps NOAA enforcement agents locate and block IUU seafood imports from entering U.S. markets. The program requires full traceability—that is, documentation from the point of capture to the point of entry.

=== Seafood commerce and certification ===
NOAA Fisheries' Seafood Inspection Program certifies U.S. seafood products for domestic consumption and for export. This voluntary, fee-for-service program's inspection activities include vessel and plant sanitation inspections and seafood product quality evaluations. After inspecting a company's seafood products, a National Seafood Inspection Program officer issues and signs the certificates required to accompany U.S. seafood exports to countries that require health certification. The program also develops product grade standards, specifications, and international policies, and provides training and education within the industry and for consumers.

=== Fishery observers ===
NOAA Fisheries has placed trained fishery observers aboard commercial fishing vessels to collect a variety of data on catch, bycatch, and fishing operations since the 1970s. Fishery observers are trained biologists who collect data on fishing activities onboard commercial vessels in support of science and management programs. They collect a variety of data including catch, bycatch, fishing effort, biological characteristics, interactions with protected species, and socioeconomic information. This information is used by NOAA Fisheries to perform stock assessments, construct fishery management plan regulations, develop bycatch reduction devices, and identify the need for protective regulations for protected species. Observer programs across the United States are engaging in cross-sector partnerships to explore the potential of electronic monitoring to augment observer programs in a cost-efficient manner.

== Law Enforcement ==
The NMFS also has a federal law enforcement agency, working closely with state enforcement agencies, the United States Coast Guard, and foreign enforcement authorities. The National Oceanic and Atmospheric Administration Fisheries Office of Law Enforcement (NOAA OLE) was founded in 1930 as the Division of Law Enforcement, U.S. Fish Commission and Bureau. Responsible for conservation and ecosystem protection of national marine life - it is the only federal agency for such purposes. As of 2011 the agency has over 200 employees, divided into five regional offices (Northeast, Southeast, Alaska, West Coast, and Pacific Islands), each led by an Assistant Director.

== Regulations ==
The NMFS regulatory program is one of the most active in the federal government, with hundreds of regulations published annually in the Federal Register. Most regulations are published to conserve marine fisheries under the Magnuson-Stevens Fishery Conservation and Management Act; other regulations are published under the Marine Mammal Protection Act and Endangered Species Act. The NMFS also regulates fisheries pursuant to decisions of "regional fishery management organizations" (RFMOs)(RFMOs) and other RFMOs to which the U.S. is a party, such as the Inter-American Tropical Tuna Commission, the International Commission for the Conservation of Atlantic Tunas, the Western and Central Pacific Fisheries Commission, the Agreement on the International Dolphin Conservation Program, the International Pacific Halibut Commission, etc.

In 2007, the NMFS issued regulations to protect endangered whales from fatal fishing-gear entanglements after environmental groups sued to force action on the rules, which were proposed in early 2005. The rules were enacted to specifically protect the North Atlantic right whale, of which about only 350 remain. Marine-gear entanglements and ship strikes are the top human causes of right whale deaths. On July 1, the shipping lanes in and out of Boston Harbor were rotated to avoid an area with a high concentration of the right whales. In the fiscal year 2017, the Marine Mammal and Sea Turtle Program of NOAA's NMFS, Greater Atlantic Regional Fisheries Office, Protected Resources Division, carried out the mandates of the Marine Mammal Protection Act (MMPA) and the Endangered Species Act (ESA), and was charged with protecting the whales, dolphins, porpoises, seals and sea turtles that occur within the greater Atlantic region. This program currently includes marine mammal health and stranding response, large whale disentanglement, and sea turtle stranding and disentanglement. To implement this program, NMFS established several networks of volunteer organizations that it authorizes to respond to stranded marine mammals and sea turtles and entangled large whales and sea turtles. NMFS seeks the submission of proposals addressing Marine Animal Entanglement Response in the Commonwealth of Massachusetts.

=== Regional fisheries management councils ===
The eight domestic regional fisheries management councils make binding regulations for federal waters off various parts of the U.S. coast:

- North Pacific Fishery Management Council (Alaska)
- Pacific Fishery Management Council (West Coast)
- Western Pacific Regional Fishery Management Council (Hawaii and Pacific territories)
- Gulf of Mexico Fishery Management Council
- Caribbean Fishery Management Council (Puerto Rico and U.S. Virgin Islands)
- South Atlantic Fishery Management Council
- Mid-Atlantic Fishery Management Council (Upper North Carolina to New York)
- New England Fishery Management Council

== Science centers ==
The National Marine Fisheries Service operates six fisheries science centers covering marine fisheries conducted by the United States. The science centers correspond roughly to the administrative division of fisheries management into five regions, with the west coast utilizing two fisheries science centers.

The Northeast Fisheries Science Center is headquartered in Woods Hole, Massachusetts. It operates laboratories at five other locations, and an additional marine field station. Its primary mission is the management of fisheries on the Northeast shelf. However, it also oversees the operation of the National Systematics Lab, in conjunction with the Smithsonian Institution. The Northeast Fisheries Science Center also operates the Woods Hole Science Aquarium in conjunction with the Marine Biological Laboratory.

The NMFS maintains the Northwest and Alaska Fisheries Science Centers, both located in Seattle. The Alaska Fisheries Science Center is located on the grounds of the now-closed Naval Station Puget Sound. The Northwest Fisheries Science Center is located adjacent to the University of Washington. This site is also home to the Northwest and Alaska Fisheries Science Center Library, founded in 1931. As of 2011, this library contained 16,000 books and subscribed to 250 periodicals. Its subject interests include aquatic science, biochemistry, fisheries biology, fisheries management, food science, and marine science.

The Pacific Islands Fisheries Science Center is headquartered in Honolulu, Hawaii, on the campus of the University of Hawaii at Monoa. It operates several facilities, including facilities for NOAA ships at Ford Island.

The Southeast Fisheries Science Center is headquartered in Miami, Florida, and monitors marine fisheries in the American Southeast, including Puerto Rico and the US Virgin Islands. It additionally operates five labs, some of which operate multiple facilities.

The Southwest Fisheries Science Center, headquartered in La Jolla, California, monitors and advises fisheries in NOAA's Southwest region. It operates facilities on the campus of the Scripps Institution of Oceanography. In 2013, a large facility on La Jolla Shores Drive was built by the architects Gould Evans, replacing an older building that was threatened by coastal erosion. (Although the original architects, 50 years earlier, had been informed that they were building on a "block-glide landslide," they received exemption "from local building code requirements for a preconstruction engineering geology study because it was a U.S. government complex." A 1979 book on coastal erosion reported that the building was "disastrously located. The 'Tuna Hilton' rests partially on a piece of bluff known as a slump block. Designers say the building is specially articulated so that it should stay intact as the bluff falls from underneath its seaward end.")

== Controversies ==
In 2016, the NMFS caused the death of the L95 killer whale of the critically endangered southern resident population. This population travels along the coast of both the United States and Canada, and Canada does not use barbed satellite tags to track them because the method is invasive, but the NMFS made the unilateral decision to tag southern resident orcas. The L95 whale died 5 weeks after being shot with a barbed satellite tag and the Canadian necropsy concluded the barb caused a lethal fungal infection. Prior to L95's tagging, Center for Whale Research Senior Scientist Ken Balcomb documented tag detachment issues and was assured by the NMFS that these issues were "fixed", but the tag on L95 broke off and pieces of the barb remained in L95 until death. Although Balcomb documented infections where barbs had failed to detach on killer whales and presented his findings to the NMFS, the NMFS denied responsibility, stating: "Our experience with previous occurrences of tag attachment failure has shown no impact to the whale's general health." Though ocean water could enter the wound and whale skin is not sterile, the NMFS stated the fungal infection may have occurred because the barbed tag was dropped in the ocean and was sterilized with only alcohol, rather than both alcohol and bleach, prior to being aimed again at the orca. Two other members of the southern resident orca population disappeared within weeks of being tagged by the NMFS and are presumed dead, although the cause of death, if dead, is uncertain as the bodies were not recovered. Wildlife biologist Brad Hanson supervised the NMFS's killer-whale tagging program. He was not removed from his position following the incident.

== See also ==
- Atlantic Coastal Cooperative Statistics Program
- List of United States federal law enforcement agencies
- National Oceanic and Atmospheric Administration Fisheries Office of Law Enforcement
