= Magnuson–Stevens Fishery Conservation and Management Act =

US law for management of marine fisheries

- Other short titles: Interim Fisheries Zone Extension and Management Act
- Long title: An Act to provide for the conservation and management of the fisheries, and for other purposes.
- Acronyms (colloquial): MSFCMA; FCMA; MSA
- Nicknames: Fishery Conservation and Management Act of 1976
- Enacted by: the 94th United States Congress
- Effective: April 13, 1976

Citations
- Public law: 94-265
- Statutes at Large: 90 Stat. 331

Codification
- Titles amended: 16 U.S.C.: Conservation
- U.S.C. sections created: 16 U.S.C. ch. 38 § 1801 et seq.

Legislative history
- Introduced in the House as H.R. 200 by Gerry Studds (D–MA) on January 14, 1975; Committee consideration by House Merchant Marine and Fisheries, Senate Commerce; Passed the House on October 9, 1975 (208-101); Passed the Senate on January 28, 1976 (77-19, in lieu of S. 961); Reported by the joint conference committee on March 24, 1976; agreed to by the Senate on March 29, 1976 (Agreed) and by the House on March 30, 1976 (346-52); Signed into law by President Gerald Ford on April 13, 1976

Major amendments
- Magnuson-Stevens Reauthorization Act

United States Supreme Court cases
- Japan Whaling Ass'n v. American Cetacean Society, 478 U.S. 221 (1986); Loper Bright Enterprises v. Raimondo, No. 22-451, 603 U.S. ___ (2024)

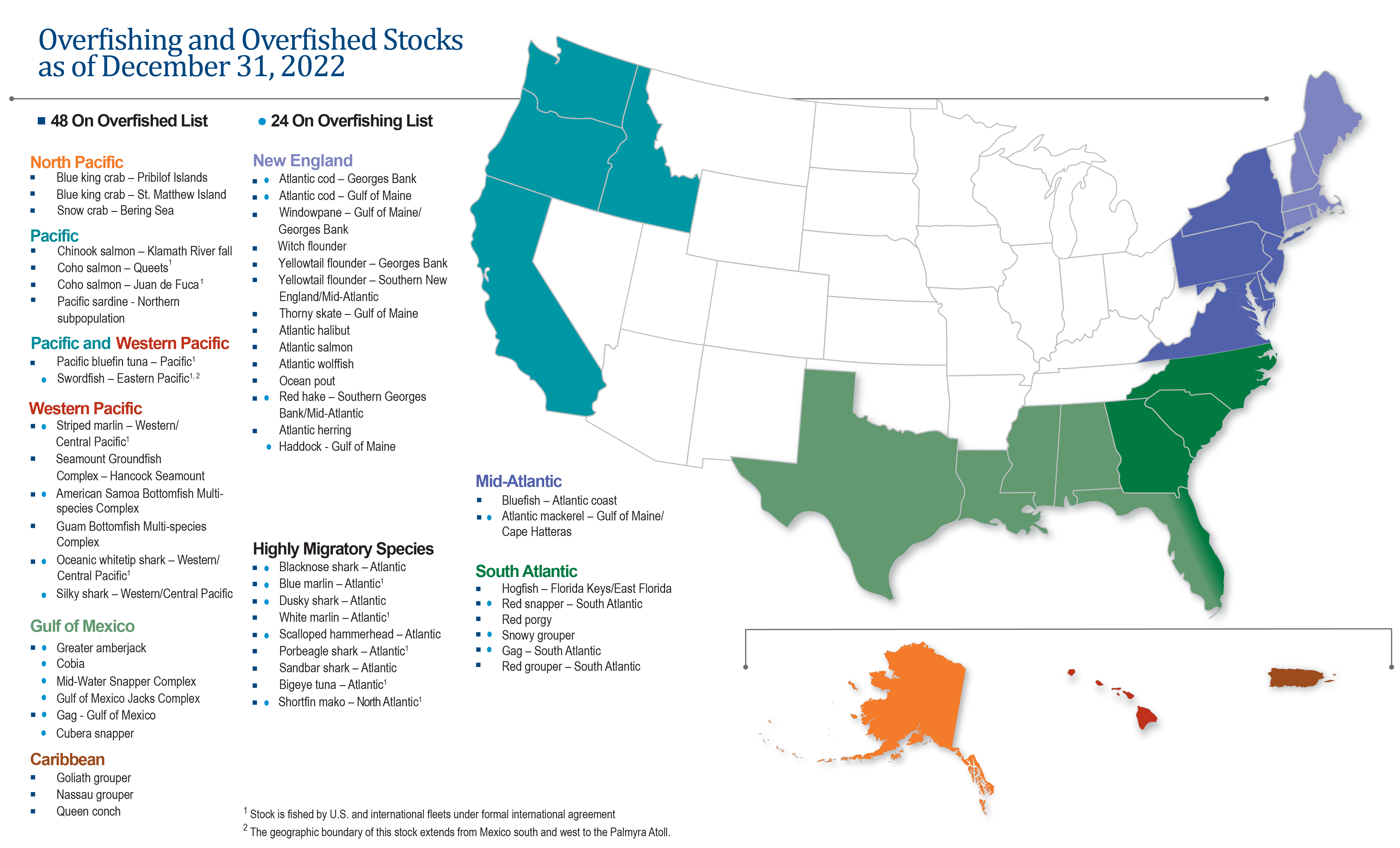
Overfished US stocks 2022

The Magnuson–Stevens Fishery Conservation and Management Act (MSFCMA), commonly referred to as the Magnuson–Stevens Act (MSA), is the legislation providing for the management of marine fisheries in U.S. waters. Originally enacted in 1976 to assert control of foreign fisheries that were operating within 200 nautical miles off the U.S. coast, the legislation has since been amended, in 1996 and 2007, to better address the twin problems of overfishing and overcapacity (i.e., too much fishing power). These ecological and economic problems arose in the domestic fishing industry as it grew to fill the vacuum left by departing foreign fishing fleets.

Eight regional fishery management councils, composed of representatives of the fishing industry and state fishery officials, prepare fishery management plans for approval and implementation by the National Marine Fisheries Service (NMFS), which is an agency within the National Oceanic and Atmospheric Administration (NOAA), a part of the Department of Commerce. The plans are amended frequently to adjust management policies and measures to changes in fish stock abundance and to meet the goals of the MSA as they are revised by the Congress. Acting on behalf of the Secretary of Commerce, who is responsible for implementing the MSA's mandates, the NOAA administrator must determine whether a council's proposed plan amendment or adjustment meets the MSA's National Standards. These standards require that management measures actually prevent overfishing, are based on the best scientific information available, and are fair and equitable. If allocations of allowable catches are necessary to prevent overfishing or rebuild overfished stocks, such allocation schemes do not allow sectors of the industry to obtain an excessive share.

== Background ==
The Magnuson–Stevens Fishery Conservation and Management Act is the primary law governing marine fisheries management in United States federal waters. The law is named after U.S. Senators Warren G. Magnuson of Washington state and Ted Stevens of Alaska, who sponsored the Senate bill, S. 200, that eventually was enacted.

The Magnuson–Stevens Act was originally enacted as the Fishery Conservation and Management Act of 1976. The U.S. House of Representatives bill, H.R. 200, was introduced by Representative Gerry Studds (D-Mass), who obtained bipartisan support for the bill from Rep. Don Young (R-Alaska) through common concern over the fishing power of the foreign fleets operating off their respective coasts. Their goal was to extend the exclusive fisheries zone of the U.S. from 12 to 200 nautical miles from the coastline. Opposed by national security and foreign relations officials in the White House, the 94th United States Congress nevertheless enacted the bill, and it was signed into law by the 38th President of the United States Gerald Ford on April 13, 1976. The final version of the law, Public Law 94-265, extended fisheries jurisdiction to 200 miles. It also created eight regional fishery management councils to assist the Secretary of Commerce in managing the fisheries of the United States. The role included advising the Secretary of State whether foreign fishing fleets could have access to fish stocks that U.S. fishermen did not have the capacity to harvest.

The United States fishery management law has been amended many times over the years. Two major recent sets of amendments to the law were the Sustainable Fisheries Act of 1996, and then 10 years later the Magnuson–Stevens Fishery Conservation and Management Reauthorization Act of 2006. In short, the goal of these amendments was to require the regional councils and the Secretary of Commerce to identify overfished stocks and to rebuild them in as short a time as possible.

== Purpose ==
The MSFCMA was enacted to promote the U.S. fishing industry's optimal exploitation of coastal fisheries by "consolidating control over territorial waters" and establishing eight regional councils to manage fish stocks. The act has been amended several times in response to continued overfishing of major stocks. The most recent version, authorized in 2007, includes seven purposes:

1. Acting to conserve fishery resources
2. Supporting enforcement of international fishing agreements
3. Promoting fishing in line with conservation principles
4. Providing for the implementation of fishery management plans (FMPs) which achieve optimal yield
5. Establishing Regional Fishery Management Councils to steward fishery resources through the preparation, monitoring, and revising of plans which (A) enable stake holders to participate in the administration of fisheries and (B) consider social and economic needs of states.
6. Developing underutilized fisheries
7. Protecting essential fish habitats

Additionally, the law calls for reducing bycatch and establishing fishery information monitoring systems.

== Regulatory mechanisms ==
Eight Regional Fishery Management Councils are charged with developing and recommending fishery management plans, both to restore depleted stocks and manage healthy stocks. The National Marine Fisheries Service (NMFS) aids the Secretary of Commerce, who evaluates, approves, and implements the Councils' FMPs. Regional Fishery Management Council members are nominated by the governors of their respective states, and appointed by the Secretary of Commerce. The eight councils are the Western Pacific, North Pacific, Pacific, Gulf of Mexico, Caribbean, South Atlantic, Mid-Atlantic, and New England fisheries management councils.

A FMP must specify the criteria which determine when a stock is overfished and the measures needed to rebuild it. Regional councils regulate fishers with mechanisms, including annual catch limits, individual catch limits, community development quotas, and others. The Marine Fish Conservation Network highlighted the most significant changes in the mechanisms utilized in a 2010 report:

"To achieve the goal of ending overfishing … Congress strengthened the role of science in the fishery management process and required fishery managers to establish science based annual catch limits (ACLs) and accountability measures (AMs) for all US fisheries with a deadline of 2010 for all stocks subject to overfishing… The new fisheries law requires the councils' science advisors, the scientific and statistical committees to make recommendations for 'acceptable biological catch' (ABC) which managers may not exceed…"

The ACL is the centerpiece of the report which is supplemented by other mechanisms regulating the types of gear used, licensing vessels, and using of observers on fishing boats. In section 303 b, the Act enumerates the types of actions authorized for use by councils to achieve optimal catch goals. Including

1. Permitting vessels or operators
2. Designating Zones and periods where fishing is limited
3. Limiting sale, catch or transport of certain fish.
4. Regulating types of fishing equipment
5. Requiring observers onboard vessels

== Regulatory effectiveness ==
The act's results vary for different regions and different fish stocks. It did not prevent the overfishing of many species throughout its first 20 years of existence. This prompted major amendments in 1996 and 2006. The National Marine Fisheries Service issued a report to Congress in 2010 on the status of U.S. fisheries. It reported that of the 192 stocks monitored for overfishing 38 stocks (20%) still have fish "mortality rates that exceed the overfishing threshold … and 42 stocks (22%) are overfished". This is down from 38% and 48% respectively in 2000. A 2003 NMFS report reviewed achievements of the act since 1996. Highlighting the inconsistent effects of the legislation, it revealed that overfishing was eliminated in 15 major fish stocks while overfishing was initiated in 12 major fish stocks. To improve their overfishing prevention programs, the NMFS has implemented the Fish Stock Sustainability Index (FSSI), which measures key stocks according to their overfishing status and biomass levels. Since the FSSI began the index has increased every year.

The act also has impacts on financial matters. While taxpayers have paid over $3 billion on NMFS programs since the acts inception, ultimately the fishing industry is most affected by the act's design flaws and incomplete implementation. According to Zeke Grader, Jr., the executive director of the Pacific Coast Federation of Fishermen's Associations, the largest active trade association of commercial fishermen on the west coast, "Most of the U.S. fisheries stocks are facing a disaster due to over capitalization of the fishing industry and the mismanagement practices of U.S. Department of Commerce's National Marine Fisheries Service (NMFS) and their appointed regional fishery management councils". Chris Kellogg, chief technical officer for the New England Fishery Management Council, emphasizes the tenuous position of many fishers, "On average, my guess is the fishing harvesting industry here in New England is basically covering costs and just on the border of solvency and insolvency".

== Stakeholders ==
Many interest groups are concerned with the forming of fisheries conservation legislation. Fishers, corporations, activist groups and the public all share interest in protecting fishing eco-systems and economies via the MSFCMA.

Fishers advocate measures that encourage regulatory processes to be scaled to the local level and which ensure fishing privileges aren't concentrated into small groups. They are also aware that if too much competition for finite resources prevails, their livelihood will suffer. Despite this, some fishermen prefer minimal government intervention in their market, defiantly demanding "the right to go broke".

The fishing industry is worth $4 billion annually, as of 2010. Fish harvesting and processing corporations are invested in the political process to maximize their profits, to protect against foreign competition and to prevent regulations from making their proprietary information available to the public. Candice May, of Colorado State University, argues that federal legislators can't forge these relationships largely because they haven't properly identified what a "fishing community" is. She highlights the successes of the Community Development Quota system employed in some Alaska fisheries.

Non-governmental organizations (NGOs) focusing on fish conservation and environmentalism were key forces behind the incremental improvements in the law's regulatory mechanisms. The Pew Oceans Commission and the US commission on Oceans Policy prompted many of the amendments found within the 2006 reauthorization. Many advocacy groups speak through coalitions. The Marine Fish Conservation Network, for example, represents over 90 member organizations from across the United States.

The public is represented as a stake holder by elected representatives, who ostensibly take them into consideration when drafting ways to protect public resources such as fish stocks.

== Critiques ==
The major criticisms of the act have been its failure to stem overfishing. This includes the failure of the Secretary of Commerce, acting through NOAA, to require regulations that minimize catches of non-target species (referred to as "bycatch") or to ban discarding at sea undersized or unwanted catches of target species, and to hold accountable regional councils that don't enforce or implement fisheries management plans. Additionally, some of the regional councils' policies, such as restarting the timeline for rebuilding overfished stocks, appear to critics to have shielded commercial fishermen from the consequences of their poor business decisions and thereby inadequately protected the marine ecosystems they depend upon. Additionally, the critics have contended that the management plans lack transparency requirements for fishery related data.

Limited federal enforcement and high levels of non-compliance with management regulations have contributed to stock depletion. Fishermen have accused each other of cheating on landings and chastised regulators for concentrating the quota allocations into too few hands. Other critics claim the regulatory framework is too "top-down" and alienates local fishers, thereby reducing the likelihood to achieve the cooperation needed to enforce many provisions.

In response to these criticisms, NOAA adopted a National Catch Share Policy, and encouraged regional management councils to allocate catch quotas to individual fishermen, groups of fishing companies operating through cooperatives, or fishing communities. "On May 1, 2010, the National Marine Fisheries Service (NMFS) implemented a new management system for ground fish in New England. It established 17 fishermen-run collectives, called sectors. Sectors were pioneered by fishermen as voluntary, cooperative and community-based, and were designed to protect fleet diversity and coastal communities. The new management system operates on three simple premises:

- It implements science-based catch limits to rebuild fish populations and prevent overfishing.
- It incorporates monitoring so fishermen and regulators know exactly how much fish is being caught, and as a result, fishing stops once catch limits have been reached.
- Each sector receives its own share of the annual catch. While respecting catch limits, the co-ops provide fishermen with the flexibility to set their own fishing guidelines so they can run their businesses more efficiently and profitably. Those who develop more innovative fishing gear can target more of the healthy fish populations and avoid those populations that are struggling."

As reported at the Council meeting, the first three months of sector operations resulted in (May 1 – August 15):

- Fishermen earning more money for less fishing under the new system. In 2010, landings are down compared to 2009. Only 85.8 percent of total landings last year were landed this year (for the same period of time). Meanwhile, revenues are up 112.4 percent.
- Sector fishermen are avoiding weak stocks and targeting robust stocks. The ratio of Georges Bank cod to Georges Bank haddock (in metric tons) in 2009 was 1121:1532. In 2010, it was 743:2768.
- Landings of Gulf of Maine winter flounder, a stock at very low abundance, are being effectively avoided under sectors. In 2009, 66 metric tons were landed. In 2010, 32 metric tons were landed."

== See also ==
- Fisheries management
- Sustainable fisheries
- North Pacific Fishery Management Council
