= Essential fish habitat =

Essential Fish Habitat (EFH) was defined by the U.S. Congress in the 1996 amendments to the Magnuson-Stevens Fishery Conservation and Management Act, or Magnuson-Stevens Act, as "those waters and substrate necessary to fish for spawning, breeding, feeding or growth to maturity." Implementing regulations clarified that waters include all aquatic areas and their physical, chemical, and biological properties; substrate includes the associated biological communities that make these areas suitable for fish habitats, and the description and identification of EFH should include habitats used at any time during the species' life cycle. EFH includes all types of aquatic habitat, such as wetlands, coral reefs, sand, seagrasses, and rivers.

NOAA Fisheries works with the regional fishery management councils to designate EFH using the best available scientific information. EFH has been described for more than a 1,000 managed species to date. The main purpose of EFH regulations is to minimize the adverse effects of fishing and non fishing impacts on EFH to the maximum extent practicable.

== Magnuson-Stevens Fishery Conservation and Management Act ==
In 1996, the Magnuson-Stevens Fishery Conservation and Management Act was amended to establish a new requirements to identify and describe EFH to protect, conserve and enhance EFH for the benefit of the fisheries. The Magnuson-Stevens Act has jurisdiction over the management and conservation of marine fish species. Federal agencies must consult with NOAA Fisheries when their actions or activities may adversely affect habitat identified by federal regional fishery management councils or NOAA Fisheries as EFH. On December 19, 1997, interim final rules were published in the Federal Register (Vol. 62, No. 244) which specify procedures for implementation of the EFH provisions of the Magnuson-Stevens Act. These rules were amended by publication of final rules on January 17, 2002 (Vol. 67, No. 12). he rules, in two subparts, address requirements for fishery management plan (FMP) amendment, and detail the coordination, consultation, and recommendation requirements of the Magnuson-Stevens Act.

== Regulatory Text ==
The Magnuson-Stevens Fishery Conservation and Management Act, defines essential fish habitat (EFH) as “...those waters and substrate necessary to fish for spawning, breeding, feeding, or growth to maturity.” Section 305 (b) 2-4 of the MSA describes EFH regulations and Council actions:

(2) Each Federal agency shall consult with the Secretary with respect to any action authorized, funded, or undertaken, or proposed to be authorized, funded, or undertaken, by such agency that may adversely affect any essential fish habitat identified under this Act.
(3) Each Council—
(A) may comment on and make recommendations to the Secretary and any Federal or State agency concerning any activity authorized, funded, or undertaken, or proposed to be authorized, funded, or undertaken, by any Federal or State agency that, in the view of the Council, may affect the habitat, including essential fish habitat, of a fishery resource under its authority; and
(B) shall comment on and make recommendations to the Secretary and any Federal or State agency concerning any such activity that, in the view of the Council, is likely to substantially affect the habitat, including essential fish habitat, of an anadromous fishery resource under its authority.
(4)(A) If the Secretary receives information from a Council or Federal or State agency or determines from other sources that an action authorized, funded, or undertaken, or proposed to be authorized, funded, or undertaken, by any State or Federal agency would adversely affect any essential fish habitat identified under this Act, the Secretary shall recommend to such agency measures that can be taken by such agency to conserve such habitat.
(B) Within 30 days after receiving a recommendation under subparagraph (A), a Federal agency shall provide a detailed response in writing to any Council commenting under paragraph (3) and the Secretary regarding the matter. The response shall include a description of measures proposed by the agency for avoiding, mitigating, or offsetting the impact of the activity on such habitat. In the case of a response that is inconsistent with the recommendations of the Secretary, the Federal agency shall explain its reasons for not following the recommendations.”

The EFH Final Rule 50 CFR Part 600 offers specific definitions, coordination procedures, and processes to consult on actions that adversely effect EFH.

== Council Actions ==
Impacts from certain fishing practices and coastal and marine development and may alter, damage, or destroy habitats essential for fish. NOAA Fisheries, the regional fishery management councils (FMCs), and other federal agencies work together to minimize these threats. Congress has created councils to classify unfavorable impacts on fishes in relation to types of fishing gear, coastal developments and nonpoint and point source pollution, as well as, evaluating how well each fishery is managed. The FMCs, with assistance from NOAA Fisheries, has delineated EFH for federally managed species. As new FMPs are developed, EFH for newly managed species will also be defined. FMPs must describe and identify EFH for the fishery, minimize to the extent practicable the adverse effects of fishing on EFH, and identify other actions to encourage the conservation and enhancement of EFH.

== EFH Consultations ==
Through consultations, NOAA Fisheries can recommend ways federal agencies can avoid or minimize the adverse effects of their actions on the habitat of federally managed commercial and recreational fisheries. Federal action agencies which fund, permit, or carry out activities that may adversely affect EFH are required to consult with NOAA Fisheries. The federal action agency must provide NOAA Fisheries with an assessment of all actions or proposed actions authorized, funded, or undertaken by the agency that may adversely affect EFH. Then NOAA Fisheries will provide the federal action agency with EFH Conservation recommendations. These Conservation Recommendations provide information on how to avoid, minimize, mitigate, or offset those adverse effects. Federal action agencies must provide a written explanation to NOAA Fisheries if any of these recommendations have not been adopted. NOAA Fisheries must also include measures to minimize the adverse effects of fishing gear and fishing activities on EFH as well. In addition, NOAA Fisheries and the FMCs may comment on and make recommendations to any state agency on their activities which may affect EFH.

Most consultations are done in the NMFS regional offices: Greater Atlantic Regional Fisheries Office (GARFO), Southeast Regional Office (SERO), West Coast Regional Office (WCRO), Alaska Regional Office (AKRO), and Pacific Islands Regional Office (PIRO). National consultations spanning multiple regions can be done at NOAA Fisheries Headquarters.

State agencies and private landowners are not required to consult with NMFS. EFH consultations are required if the federal government has authorized, funded, or undertaken part or all of a proposed activity, and if the action will adversely affect EFH. Adversely affecting EFH includes direct or indirect physical, chemical or biological alterations of the waters or substrate and loss of, or injury to species and their habitat, and other ecosystem components, or reduction of the quality and/or quantity of EFH.

== Habitat Areas of Particular Concern ==
Habitat areas of particular concern or HAPCs are considered high priority areas for conservation, management, and research. HAPCs are subsets of EFH that merit special attention because they meet at least one of the following 4 criteria:

1. provide important ecological function;
2. are sensitive to environmental degradation;
3. include a habitat type that is/will be stressed by development;
4. include a habitat type that is rare.

Current HAPCs include important habitats like estuaries, canopy kelp, corals, seagrass, and rocky reefs, among other areas of interest. HAPCs are afforded the same regulatory protection as EFH and do not exclude activities from occurring in the area, such as fishing, diving, swimming or surfing.

== EFH vs. Critical Habitat ==
Essential Fish Habitat is designated for all federally managed fish under the MSA whereas Critical Habitat is designated for the survival and recovery of species listed as threatened or endangered under the Endangered Species Act (ESA). Critical habitats include areas occupied by the threatened or endangered species that include physical and biological features that are essential to the conservation of the species. Critical Habitat is designated as critical at the time a species is listed under the ESA. EFH and Critical Habitat are different in terms of designation and regulation, but they may overlap for certain species such as salmon.

== Habitat Characteristics ==
Habitat characteristics include sediment type, type of bottoms (sand, silt and clay), structures underlying the water surface, and aquatic community structures. These habitats are essential for fish and ecosystem health. The fundamental habitat structure begins with sediment. Erosion is stabilized by submerged aquatic vegetation. There are two main types of bottoms, hard and soft. A study by Christensen at el. (2004) looked at three bottom habitat types (vegetated marsh edge, submerged aquatic vegetation, and shallow non-vegetated bottom) in relation to juvenile brown shrimp (Farfantepenaeus aztecus). The results from the study showed that brown shrimp selected vegetated areas in salinities 15-25 ppt and they would select vegetated areas over marsh edges when they co-occurred. Finding the areas that had the highest abundance helped to identify EFH of juvenile brown shrimp.

Hard bottom also known as coral reefs or live bottom provides hard complex vertical structure for attachment of sponges, seaweed, and coral, which in turn support a diverse reef fish community. This community can comprise invertebra, coral, hard coral, bryozoans, polychaete worms, tunicates, a variety of fin-fishes, alga, and sponges. Areas of compacted or sheered mud and sediment are also a form of hard bottom.

Soft bottom consists of unconsolidated sediment and unvegetated areas. In some regions soft bottoms are not protected even though they may be primary nursery areas, anadromous fish spawning areas, and anadromous nursery areas. Characteristics that affect soft bottom in relation to organisms that utilize them include sediment grain size, salinity, dissolved oxygen and flow.

== Artificial Structures ==
In September 2012, the Gulf of Mexico Fishery Management Council (Gulf Council) solicited applications for seats on an advisory panel to review if artificial reefs, or man-made structures and substrates could be considered EFH for federally managed species. The Gulf Council was concerned about the effect that the removal of structures serving as artificial reef habitat may have on reef fish fisheries in the region. Artificial reefs can be inhabited by federally managed species and may provide important habitat necessary to fish for spawning, breeding, feeding or growth to maturity. In June 2013, Amendment Number 4 to Fishery Management Plans was put forth. The purpose of this action was to consider the role of artificial substrate as EFH. At this point, a decision has not been made on designating artificial structures as EFH.
