= Fisheries observer =

Specialist who makes observations on fishing boats

A fisheries observer is an independent specialist who serves on board commercial fishing vessels, or in fish processing plants and other platforms, and is employed by a fisheries observer program, either directly by a government agency or by a third party contractor, such as the Northwest Atlantic Fisheries Organization. Observers spend anywhere from one day to three months with the vessel, recording data on catch composition, biological sampling, and fishing activity. After returning to land, the observer is debriefed, which involves reviewing any unusual occurrences or observations, violations observed, and any safety problems or other hardships they endured during the trip. These data are then integrated into the regional agency’s database used to monitor fish quotas.

Observers are usually the only independent data collection source for some types of at-sea information, such as bycatch, catch composition, and gear configuration data. Independent data collection in this context refers to data that is not potentially biased by the fishermen. Creel surveys, trip reports, and other data obtained directly from fishermen can have some dependent bias associated with it. Fisheries-dependent information is critical for the responsible management and conservation of living marine resources, and many worldwide marine resource management regimes utilize fisheries observers for the collection of this data.

The integrity of a fisheries observer program is a function of the conduct, morale, and performance of its employees. Moreover, the stature and stability of a program has direct bearing on the quality of its data products and on the level of confidence that scientists, managers, and policy makers are able to ascribe to the use of this data.

== Fisheries observer program ==
=== Hiring requirements ===
A fisheries observer program is responsible for providing the training and support necessary for deploying observers on board fishing vessels in order to collect the fisheries-dependent information essential to achieving the management objectives of the programme. Generally, fisheries observers are required to have an educational background in the biological sciences and a proven ability to handle life at sea. Specific programs have additional or less requirements. Also required is an independent attitude, an ability to get along with people in tight quarters and strong personal integrity. "Hang Loose" and "Stand By" are the general mottos for observers because conditions, boats and circumstances often change at the last minute.

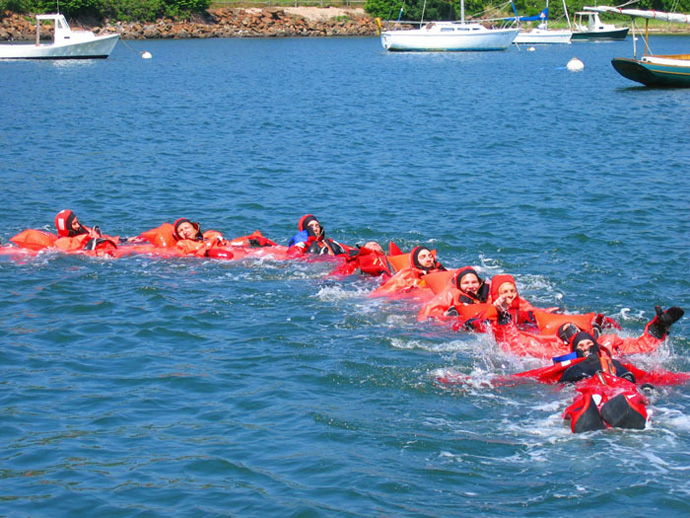
Observer training

=== Objectives ===
Fisheries observer programmes vary according to the management objective. The three main objectives are

- Scientific: including stock (targeted and / or bycatch species) assessments and predictions of future fisheries exploitation of stocks. Observer duties include collection of catch composition and environmental / ecological information, and biological sampling of catch
- Monitoring control and surveillance (MCS): including assessments of fishing and / or transhipment activities to ensure fisheries management measures are followed. Observer duties include verification of logbooks with fishing and / or transhipment activities and registering compliance with all regulations.
- Fisheries: including the objectives found in both scientific and MCS observer programmes. Observer duties also include the observer duties found in both scientific and MCS observer programs.

The International Fisheries Observer and Monitoring Conference develops, promotes and enhances effective fishery monitoring programs to ensure sustainable resource management throughout the world’s oceans. Their mission is to improve fishery monitoring and observing programs worldwide through sharing practices and development of data collection and analysis. Since many observing entities are contracted, this conference allows dialog between agencies and between those that rely upon the data collected by observers.

http://www.apo-observers.org/programs gives a list of observer programs around the world.

== NOAA National Observer Program (United States) ==
=== Mission ===
The mission of the National Observer Program is to provide a support system for observers ensuring that they are fully supported. The policies must reflect the diverse needs of regional observer programs while enhancing data quality and achieving consistency in key areas of national importance. Observers are fully assisted by the National Observer Program. Most gear is provided to observers for safety and sampling. Travel mileage, hotels, and expenses are paid while traveling to and from docks. Observers are also supported by extremely strict repercussions against any fisherman impeding or endangering them at the docks or while at sea.

=== Objectives ===
- Coordinate the National Observer Program Advisory Team.
- Communicate and advocate the mission of the National Observer Program and each regional observer program.
- Develop and support national standards and policies to create high quality, cost effective, efficient, and productive observer programs.
- Characterize and qualify the activities and resources of NOAA Fisheries observer programs and advocate for full support

=== Activities ===
Enhancements to Data Quality and Data Collection Procedures	To develop and evaluate Agency initiatives; To evaluate the procedures for collection of observer data; To develop technological and methodological improvements to data collection; To enhance the quality of observer data; To integrate observer data with other data collection programs; To update a national by catch report
Policy Development	To identify amendments in legislation to support observer program activities; To develop national continuity with regard to hiring, training, safety and health, and data confidentiality
Observer Support	To support observers to they are able to collect high quality data; To communicate NOP activities to observer community
Program Enhancements	To identify and make recommendations on NOAA’s priorities and how observers can help; To review regional observer programs and suggest improvements; To review cost efficiency and effectiveness of observer program
Outreach and Education	To communicate the goals and objective of NOAA at a national level; To design and implement outreach activities; To formalize working relationships
International	To support and participate in the International Fisheries Observer Conference; To maintain awareness of observer programs worldwide

=== Observer providers ===
Name	Fisheries Covered
A.I.S., Inc.	New England and Mid-Atlantic Gillnet and Trawl; Atlantic Scallop Dredge; North Pacific Groundfish and Halibut - Partial Coverage; Northeast Groundfish; Atlantic Longline; Gulf of Mexico and Southeastern Atlantic Shrimp Trawl; Gulf of Mexico Reef Fish
Australian Fisheries Management Authority	Eastern Tuna and Billfish Fishery; Heard Island and McDonald Island Fishery; Northern Prawn Fishery; Macquarie Island Fishery; Southern and Eastern Scalefish and Shark Fishery
Alaskan Observers, Inc.	At-Sea Hake; North Pacific Groundfish; West Coast Groundfish
East West Technical Services LLC	Atlantic Scallop Dredge; Northeast Groundfish
Fathom Research LLC.	Atlantic Scallop Dredge; Northeast Groundfish
Frank Orth & Associates	California/Oregon Driftnet; California Longline
Pacific States Marine Fisheries Commission	West Coast Groundfish
Saltwater Inc.	Alaska Crab; Alaska Marine Mammal Observer Program (AMMOP); Alaska Scallops; At-Sea Hake; North Pacific Groundfish; West Coast Groundfish

=== Data usage ===
Scientific data are the foundation of fisheries management. To manage fisheries, data are needed not only for species targeted by a fishery, but for all species in the ecosystem. Observers are the only source of independent data collection for some types of at-sea information. Bycatch, catch composition, and gear configuration cannot be seen otherwise. This data are used to support the National Marine Fisheries Service in their effort for conservation and management activities. These include: Bycatch Reduction, Stock Assessment, Protected Species, Gear Research, and Fisheries Regulations.

Fisheries inspection programmes, conducted by officials with enforcement powers are not to be considered observer programmes. Though observers may be tasked to register compliance with fisheries regulations, observers do not have enforcement powers and are not to be considered enforcement agents.

In the United States, the National Oceanographic and Atmospheric Administration oversees the Domestic Observer program.
