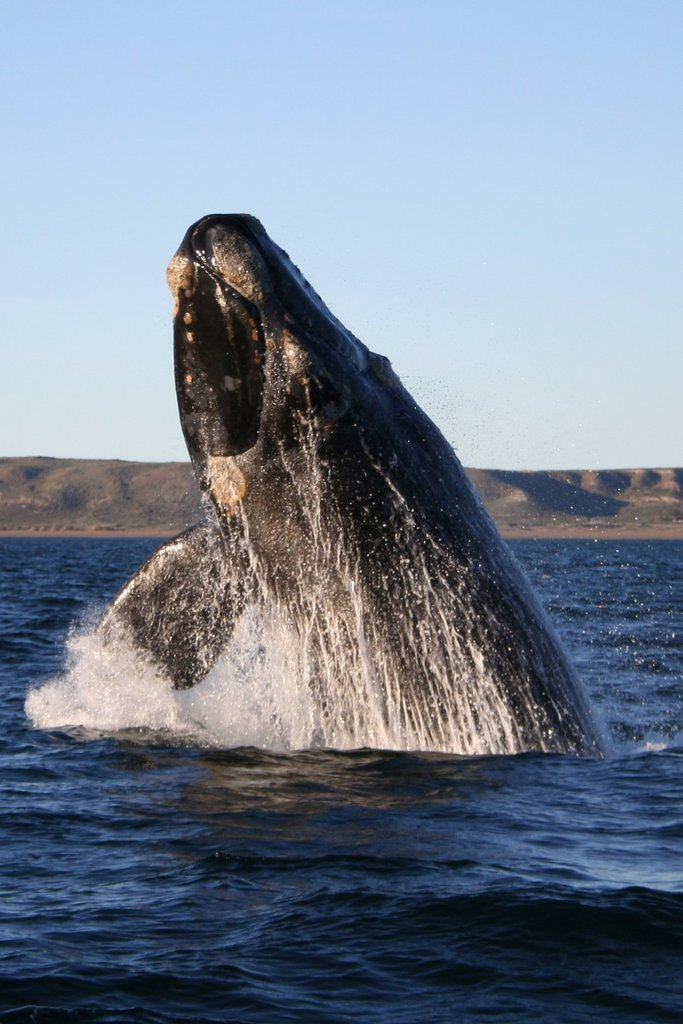
- Southern right whale

Scientific classification
- Kingdom: Animalia
- Phylum: Chordata
- Class: Mammalia
- Order: Artiodactyla
- Clade: Cetaceamorpha
- Infraorder: Cetacea

Groups included
- Parvorder Mysticeti (baleen whales); Parvorder Odontoceti (partially); Family Monodontidae (Arctic whales); Superfamily Physeteroidea (sperm whales); Family Ziphiidae (beaked whales)

Cladistically included but traditionally excluded taxa
- Family Delphinidae (oceanic dolphins); Family Phocoenidae (porpoises); Superfamily Platanistoidea (Asian river dolphins); Superfamily Inioidea (South American river dolphins)

= Whale =

Whale An informal group within the infraorder Cetacea Temporal range: Eocene - Present 50–0 Ma

Informal group of large marine mammals

Whales are a widely distributed and diverse group of fully aquatic placental marine mammals. As an informal and colloquial grouping, they correspond to large members of the infraorder Cetacea, i.e. all cetaceans apart from dolphins and porpoises. Dolphins and porpoises may be considered whales from a formal, cladistic perspective. Whales, dolphins and porpoises belong to the order Cetartiodactyla, which consists of even-toed ungulates. Their closest non-cetacean living relatives are the hippopotamuses, from which they and other cetaceans diverged about 54 million years ago. The two parvorders of whales, baleen whales (Mysticeti) and toothed whales (Odontoceti), are thought to have had their last common ancestor around 34 million years ago. Mysticetes include four extant (living) families: Balaenopteridae (the rorquals), Balaenidae (right whales), Cetotheriidae (the pygmy right whale), and Eschrichtiidae (the grey whale). Odontocetes include the Monodontidae (belugas and narwhals), Physeteridae (the sperm whale), Kogiidae (the dwarf and pygmy sperm whale), and Ziphiidae (the beaked whales), as well as the six families of dolphins and porpoises which are not considered whales in the informal sense.

Whales are fully aquatic, open-ocean animals: they can feed, mate, give birth, suckle and raise their young at sea. Whales range in size from the 2.6 metres (8.5 ft) and 135 kilograms (298 lb) dwarf sperm whale to the 29.9 metres (98 ft) and 190 tonnes (210 short tons) blue whale, which is the largest known animal that has ever lived. The sperm whale is the largest toothed predator on Earth. Several whale species exhibit sexual dimorphism, in that the females are larger than males.

Baleen whales have no teeth; instead, they have plates of baleen, fringe-like structures that enable them to expel the huge mouthfuls of water they take in while retaining the krill and plankton they feed on. Because their heads are enormous—making up as much as 40% of their total body mass—and they have throat pleats that enable them to expand their mouths, they are able to take huge quantities of water into their mouth at a time. Baleen whales also have a well-developed sense of smell.

Toothed whales, in contrast, have conical teeth adapted to catching fish or squid. They also have such keen hearing—whether above or below the surface of the water—that some can survive even if they are blind. Some species, such as sperm whales, are particularly well adapted for diving to great depths to catch squid and other favoured prey.

Whales evolved from land-living mammals, and must regularly surface to breathe air, although they can remain underwater for long periods of time. Some species, such as the sperm whale, can stay underwater for up to 90 minutes. They have blowholes (modified nostrils) located on top of their heads, through which air is taken in and expelled. They are warm-blooded, and have a layer of fat, or blubber, under the skin. With streamlined fusiform bodies and two limbs that are modified into flippers, whales can travel at speeds of up to 20 knots, though they are not as flexible or agile as seals. Whales produce a great variety of vocalizations, notably the extended songs of the humpback whale. Although whales are widespread, most species prefer the colder waters of the Northern and Southern Hemispheres and migrate to the equator to give birth. Species such as humpbacks and blue whales are capable of travelling thousands of miles without feeding. Males typically mate with multiple females every year, but females only mate every two to three years. Calves are typically born in the spring and summer; females bear all the responsibility for raising them. Mothers in some species fast and nurse their young for one to two years.

Once relentlessly hunted for their products, whales are now protected by international law. The North Atlantic right whales nearly became extinct in the twentieth century, with a population low of 450, and the North Pacific grey whale population is ranked Critically Endangered by the IUCN. Besides the threat from whalers, they also face threats from bycatch and marine pollution. The meat, blubber and baleen of whales have traditionally been used by indigenous peoples of the Arctic. Whales have been depicted in various cultures worldwide, notably by the Inuit and the coastal peoples of Vietnam. Whales feature in literature and film, as with the great white whale in Herman Melville's novel Moby-Dick. Small whales, such as belugas, are sometimes kept in captivity, but breeding success has been poor and the animals often die within a few months of capture. Whale watching has become a form of tourism around the world.

== Etymology and definitions ==
The word "whale" comes from the Old English hwæl, from Proto-Germanic *hwalaz, from Proto-Indo-European *(s)kʷálos, likely meaning either "large sea fish" or "sheatfish". The etymology is unrelated to the country of Wales.

The term "whale" is sometimes used to include dolphins and porpoises, acting as a synonym for Cetacea. Six species of oceanic dolphins (Delphinidae) have the word "whale" in their name, collectively known as blackfish: the orca or killer whale; the melon-headed whale; the pygmy killer whale; the false killer whale; and the two species of pilot whales.

The term "Great Whales" covers those species currently regulated by the International Whaling Commission: the Odontoceti family Physeteridae (sperm whales); and the Mysticeti families Balaenidae (right and bowhead whales), Eschrichtiidae (grey whales), and some of the Balaenopteridae (Minke, Bryde's, Sei, Blue and Fin; not Eden's and Omura's whales).

== Taxonomy and evolution ==
=== Phylogeny ===
The whales are part of the largely terrestrial mammalian clade Laurasiatheria. The immediate clade is Cetacea, but if the dolphins and porpoises are excluded, the whales are paraphyletic. If on the other hand the dolphins and porpoises are accepted as whales, then the sensu lato group is a clade, the Cetacea. The phylogenetic tree shows the relationships of whales and other mammals, with whale groups marked in green boldface.

- Laurasiatheria c. 99 Mya
  - Ferae
    (carnivorans and allies)
  - Perissodactyla
    (horses, rhinos, tapirs)
  - Artiodactyla c. 53 Mya
    - Tylopoda
      (camels, llamas)
    - Artiofabula
      - - Suina
          (pigs, hogs, peccaries)
        - Cetruminantia
          - Ruminants
            (cattle, sheep, antelopes)
          - Whippomorpha
            - Hippopotamidae
              (hippos)
            - Cetacea "whales", sensu lato
              - - †Archaeocetes ancient whales
                  (†Ambulocetus, †Protocetus, †Basilosaurus)
              - - Mysticeti baleen whales
                  (right whales, grey whales, rorquals)
                - Odontoceti toothed whales
                  - Delphinoidea
                    (dolphins, porpoises, beluga whales, narwhals)
                  - Lipotoidea
                    (river dolphins)
                  - Physeteroidea
                    (sperm whales)
                  - Ziphoidea
                    (beaked whales)

Cetaceans are divided into two parvorders. The larger parvorder, Mysticeti (baleen whales), is characterized by the presence of baleen, a sieve-like structure in the upper jaw made of keratin, which it uses to filter plankton, among others, from the water. Odontocetes (toothed whales) are characterized by bearing sharp teeth for hunting, as opposed to their counterparts' baleen.

=== Evolution ===
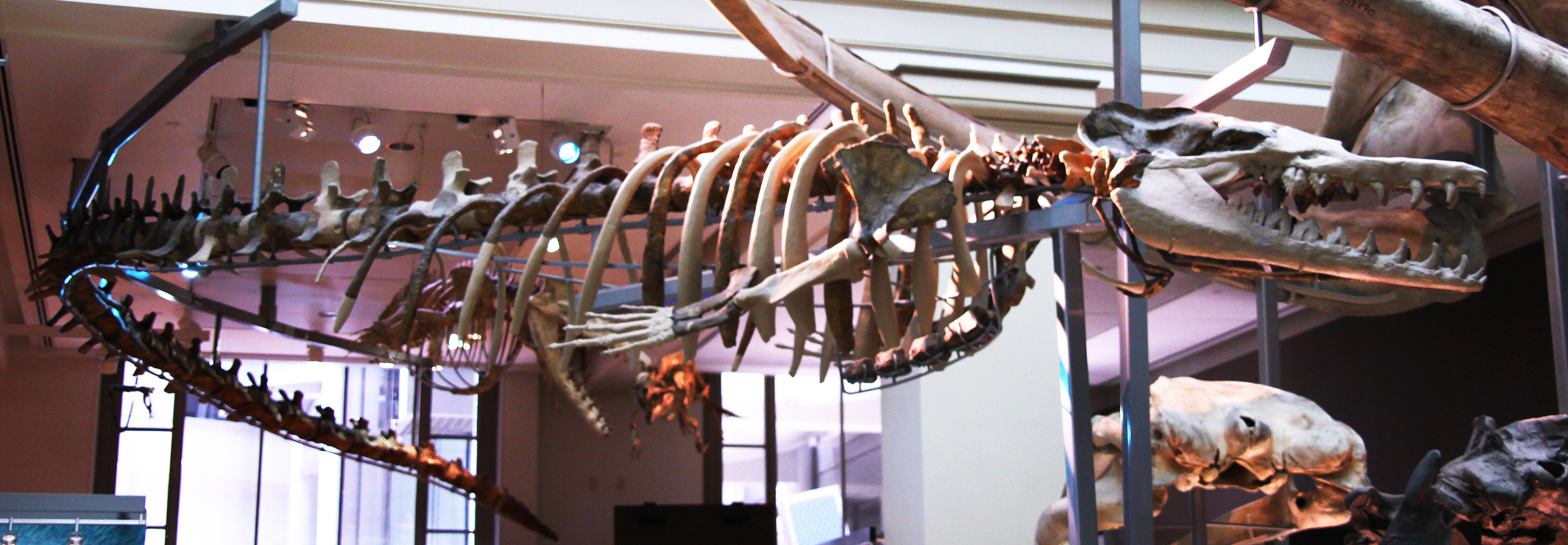
Basilosaurus skeleton

Whales are descendants of land-dwelling mammals of the artiodactyl order (even-toed ungulates). They are related to the Indohyus, an extinct chevrotain-like ungulate, from which they split approximately 48 million years ago. Primitive cetaceans, or archaeocetes, first took to the sea approximately 49 million years ago and became fully aquatic 5–10 million years later. What defines an archaeocete is the presence of anatomical features exclusive to cetaceans, alongside other primitive features not found in modern cetaceans, such as visible legs or asymmetrical teeth. Their features became adapted for living in the marine environment. Major anatomical changes included their hearing set-up that channeled vibrations from the jaw to the earbone (Ambulocetus 49 mya), a streamlined body and the growth of flukes on the tail (Protocetus 43 mya), the migration of the nostrils toward the top of the cranium (blowholes), and the modification of the forelimbs into flippers (Basilosaurus 35 mya), and the shrinking and eventual disappearance of the hind limbs (the first odontocetes and mysticetes 34 mya).

Whale morphology shows several examples of convergent evolution, the most obvious being the streamlined fish-like body shape. Other examples include the use of echolocation for hunting in low light conditions — which is the same hearing adaptation used by bats — and, in the rorqual whales, jaw adaptations, similar to those found in pelicans, that enable engulfment feeding.

Today, the closest living relatives of cetaceans are the hippopotamuses; these share a semi-aquatic ancestor that branched off from other artiodactyls some 60 mya. Around 40 mya, a common ancestor between the two branched off into cetacea and anthracotheres; nearly all anthracotheres became extinct at the end of the Pleistocene 2.5 mya, eventually leaving only one surviving lineage – the hippopotamus.

Whales split into two separate parvorders around 34 mya – the baleen whales (Mysticetes) and the toothed whales (Odontocetes).

== Biology ==
=== Anatomy ===
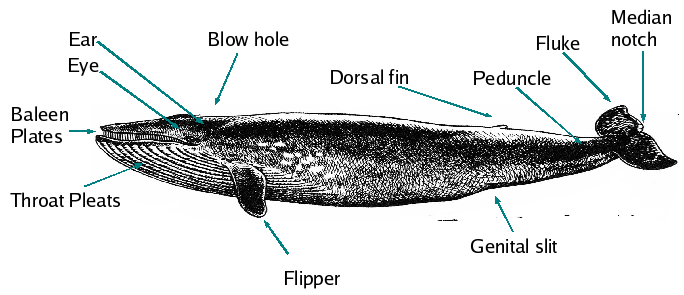
Features of a blue whale

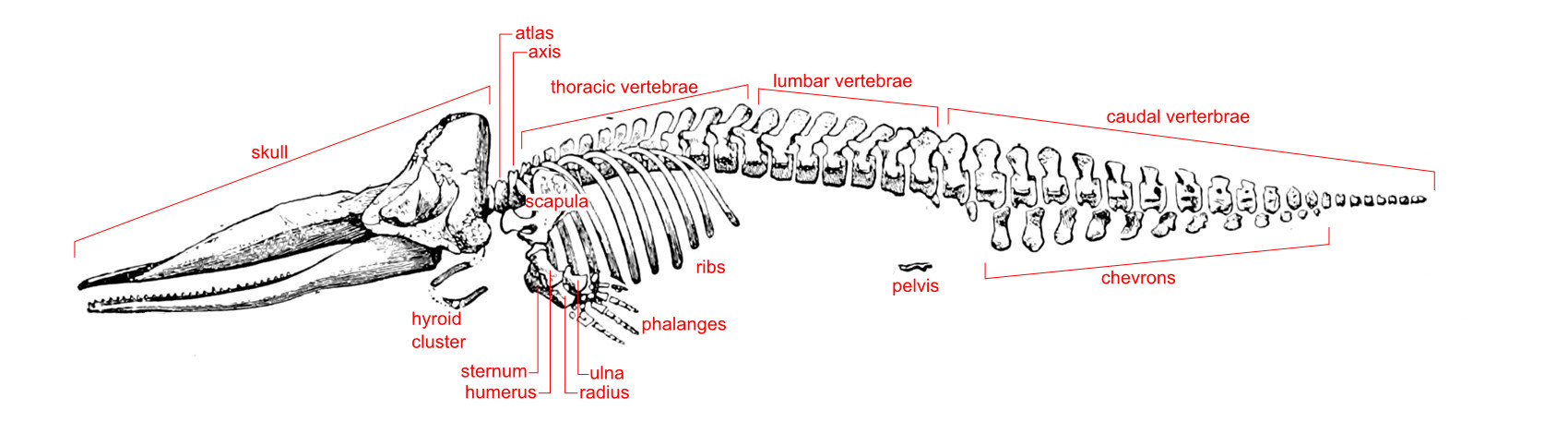
Features of a sperm whale skeleton

Whales have torpedo-shaped bodies with non-flexible necks, limbs modified into flippers, non-existent external ear flaps, a large tail fin, and flat heads (with the exception of monodontids and ziphiids). Whale skulls have small eye orbits, long snouts (with the exception of monodontids and ziphiids) and eyes placed on the sides of its head. Whales range in size from the 2.6-metre (8.5 ft) and 135-kilogram (298 lb) dwarf sperm whale to the 34-metre (112 ft) and 190-metric-ton (210-short-ton) blue whale. Overall, they tend to dwarf other cetartiodactyls; the blue whale is the largest creature on Earth. Several species have female-biased sexual dimorphism, with the females being larger than the males. One exception is with the sperm whale, which has males larger than the females.

Odontocetes, such as the sperm whale, possess teeth with cementum cells overlying dentine cells. Unlike human teeth, which are composed mostly of enamel on the portion of the tooth outside of the gum, whale teeth have cementum outside the gum. Only in larger whales, where the cementum is worn away on the tip of the tooth, does enamel show. Mysticetes have large whalebone, as opposed to teeth, made of keratin. Mysticetes have two blowholes, whereas Odontocetes contain only one.

Breathing involves expelling stale air from the blowhole, forming an upward, steamy spout, followed by inhaling fresh air into the lungs; a humpback whale's lungs can hold about 5,000 litres (1,300 US gal) of air. Spout shapes differ among species, which facilitates identification.

All whales have a thick layer of blubber. In species that live near the poles, the blubber can be as thick as 11 inches (28 cm). This blubber can help with buoyancy (which is helpful for a 100-ton whale), protection to some extent as predators would have a hard time getting through a thick layer of fat, and energy for fasting when migrating to the equator; the primary usage for blubber is insulation from the harsh climate. It can constitute as much as 50% of a whale's body weight. Calves are born with only a thin layer of blubber, but some species compensate for this with thick lanugos.

Whales have a two- to three-chambered stomach that is similar in structure to those of terrestrial carnivores. Mysticetes contain a proventriculus as an extension of the oesophagus; this contains stones that grind up food. They also have fundic and pyloric chambers.

=== Locomotion ===
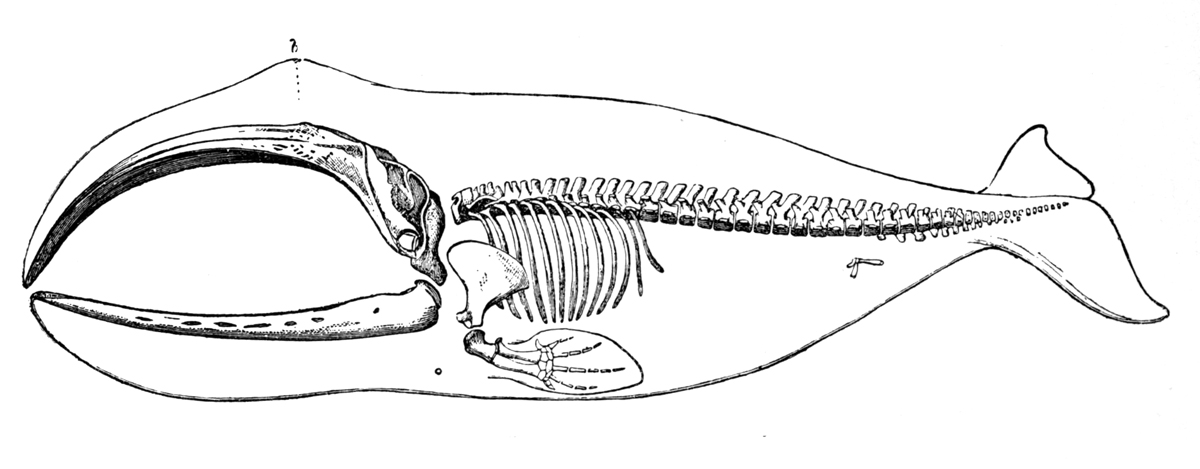
Skeleton of a bowhead whale; notice the vestigial pelvis. Richard Lydekker, 1894

Whales have two flippers on the front, and a tail fin. These flippers contain four digits. Although whales do not possess fully developed hind limbs, some, such as the sperm whale and bowhead whale, possess discrete rudimentary appendages, which may contain feet and digits. Whales are fast swimmers in comparison to seals, which typically cruise at 5–15 kn, or 9–28 kilometres per hour (5.6–17.4 mph); the fin whale, in comparison, can travel at speeds up to 47 kilometres per hour (29 mph) and the sperm whale can reach speeds of 35 kilometres per hour (22 mph). The fusing of the neck vertebrae, while increasing stability when swimming at high speeds, decreases flexibility; whales are unable to turn their heads. When swimming, whales rely on their tail fin to propel them through the water. Flipper movement is continuous. Whales swim by moving their tail fin and lower body up and down, propelling themselves through vertical movement, while their flippers are mainly used for steering. Some species log out of the water, which may allow them to travel faster. Their skeletal anatomy allows them to be fast swimmers. Most species have a dorsal fin.

Whales are adapted for diving to great depths. In addition to their streamlined bodies, they can slow their heart rate to conserve oxygen; blood is rerouted from tissue tolerant of water pressure to the heart and brain among other organs; haemoglobin and myoglobin store oxygen in body tissue; and they have twice the concentration of myoglobin than haemoglobin. Before going on long dives, many whales exhibit a behaviour known as sounding; they stay close to the surface for a series of short, shallow dives while building their oxygen reserves, and then make a sounding dive.

=== Senses ===
Biosonar by cetaceans

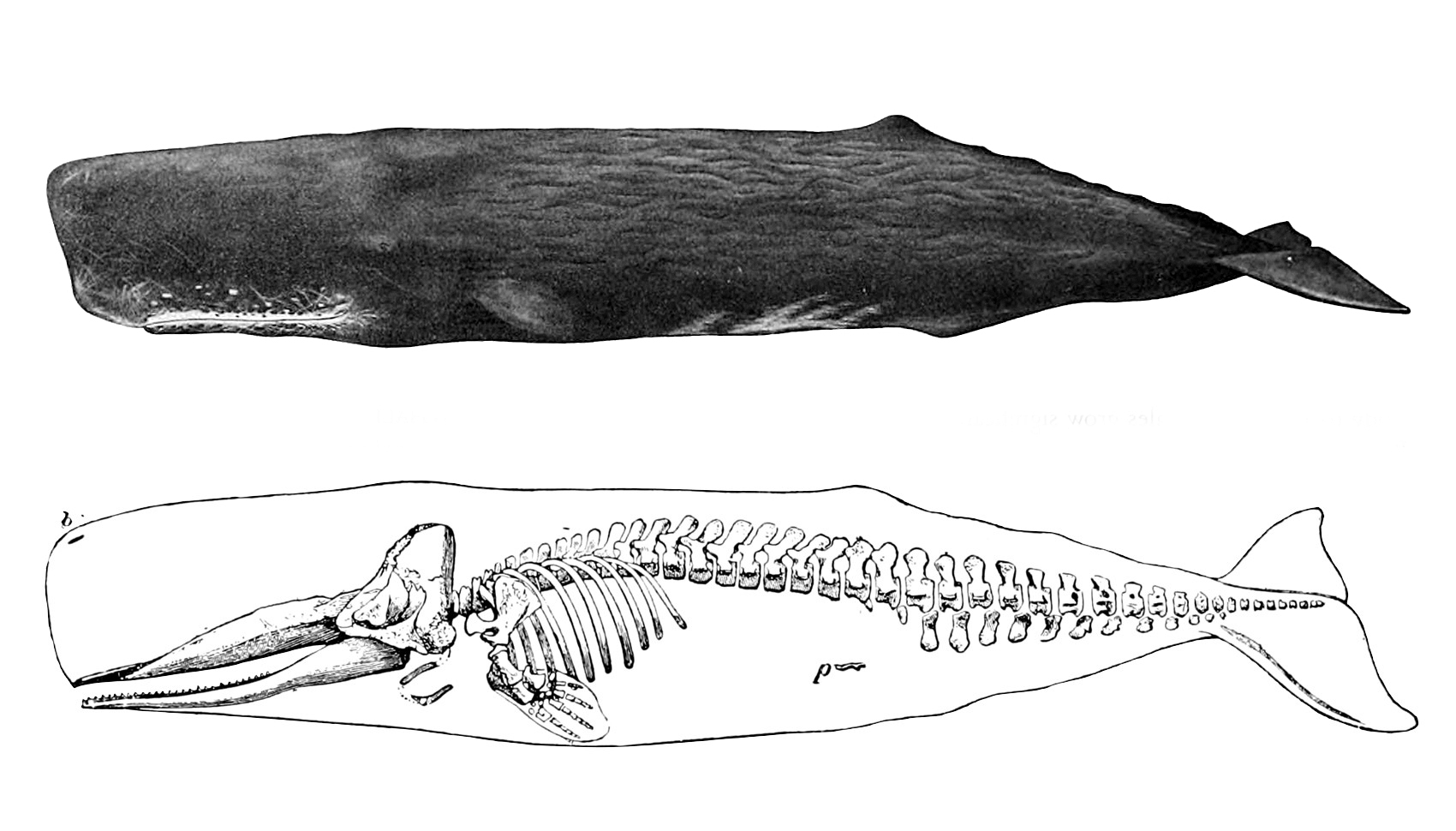
Sperm whale skeleton. Richard Lydekker, 1894.

The whale ear has specific adaptations to the marine environment. In humans, the middle ear works as an impedance equalizer between the outside air's low impedance and the cochlear fluid's high impedance. In whales, and other marine mammals, there is no great difference between the outer and inner environments. Instead of sound passing through the outer ear to the middle ear, whales receive sound through the throat, from which it passes through a low-impedance fat-filled cavity to the inner ear. The whale ear is acoustically isolated from the skull by air-filled sinus pockets, which allow for greater directional hearing underwater. Odontocetes send out high-frequency clicks from an organ known as a melon. This melon consists of fat, and the skull of any such creature containing a melon will have a large depression. The melon size varies between species, the bigger the more dependent they are on it. A beaked whale for example has a small bulge sitting on top of its skull, whereas a sperm whale's head is filled up mainly with the melon.

The whale eye is relatively small for its size, yet they do retain a good degree of eyesight. As well as this, the eyes of a whale are placed on the sides of its head, so their vision consists of two fields, rather than a binocular view like humans have. When belugas surface, their lens and cornea correct the nearsightedness that results from the refraction of light; they contain both rod and cone cells, meaning they can see in both dim and bright light, but they have far more rod cells than they do cone cells. Whales do, however, lack short wavelength sensitive visual pigments in their cone cells indicating a more limited capacity for colour vision than most mammals. Most whales have slightly flattened eyeballs, enlarged pupils (which shrink as they surface to prevent damage), slightly flattened corneas and a tapetum lucidum; these adaptations allow for large amounts of light to pass through the eye and, therefore, a very clear image of the surrounding area. They also have glands on the eyelids and outer corneal layer that act as protection for the cornea.

The olfactory lobes are absent in toothed whales, suggesting that they have no sense of smell. Some whales, such as the bowhead whale, possess a vomeronasal organ, which does mean that they can "sniff out" krill.

Whales are not thought to have a good sense of taste, as their taste buds are atrophied or missing. However, some toothed whales have preferences between different kinds of fish, indicating some sort of attachment to taste. The presence of the Jacobson's organ indicates that whales can smell food once inside their mouth, which might be similar to the sensation of taste.

=== Communication ===
Humpback whale "song"
Recording of Humpback Whales singing and Clicking.

Whale vocalization is likely to serve several purposes. Some species, such as the humpback whale, communicate using melodic sounds, known as whale song. These sounds may be extremely loud, depending on the species. Humpback whales only make clicks, while toothed whales use sonar that may generate up to 20,000 watts of sound (+73 dBm or +43 dBw), enabling them to be heard at great distances.

Captive whales occasionally mimic human speech. Scientists have suggested this indicates a strong desire on behalf of the whales to communicate with humans, as whales have a very different vocal mechanism.

Whales emit two distinct kinds of acoustic signals, which are called whistles and clicks. Clicks are quick broadband burst pulses, used for sonar, although some lower-frequency broadband vocalizations may serve a non-echolocative purpose such as communication; for example, the pulsed calls of belugas. Pulses in a click train are emitted at intervals of ≈35–50 milliseconds; the inter-click intervals are usually slightly greater than the round-trip time of sound to the target. Whistles are narrow-band frequency modulated (FM) signals, used for communicative purposes, such as contact calls.

=== Intelligence ===
Whales teach, learn, cooperate, scheme, and grieve. The neocortex of many species of whale is home to elongated spindle neurons. In humans, these cells are involved in social conduct, emotions, judgement, and theory of mind. Whale spindle neurons are found in areas of the brain homologous to where they are found in humans, suggesting that they perform a similar function.

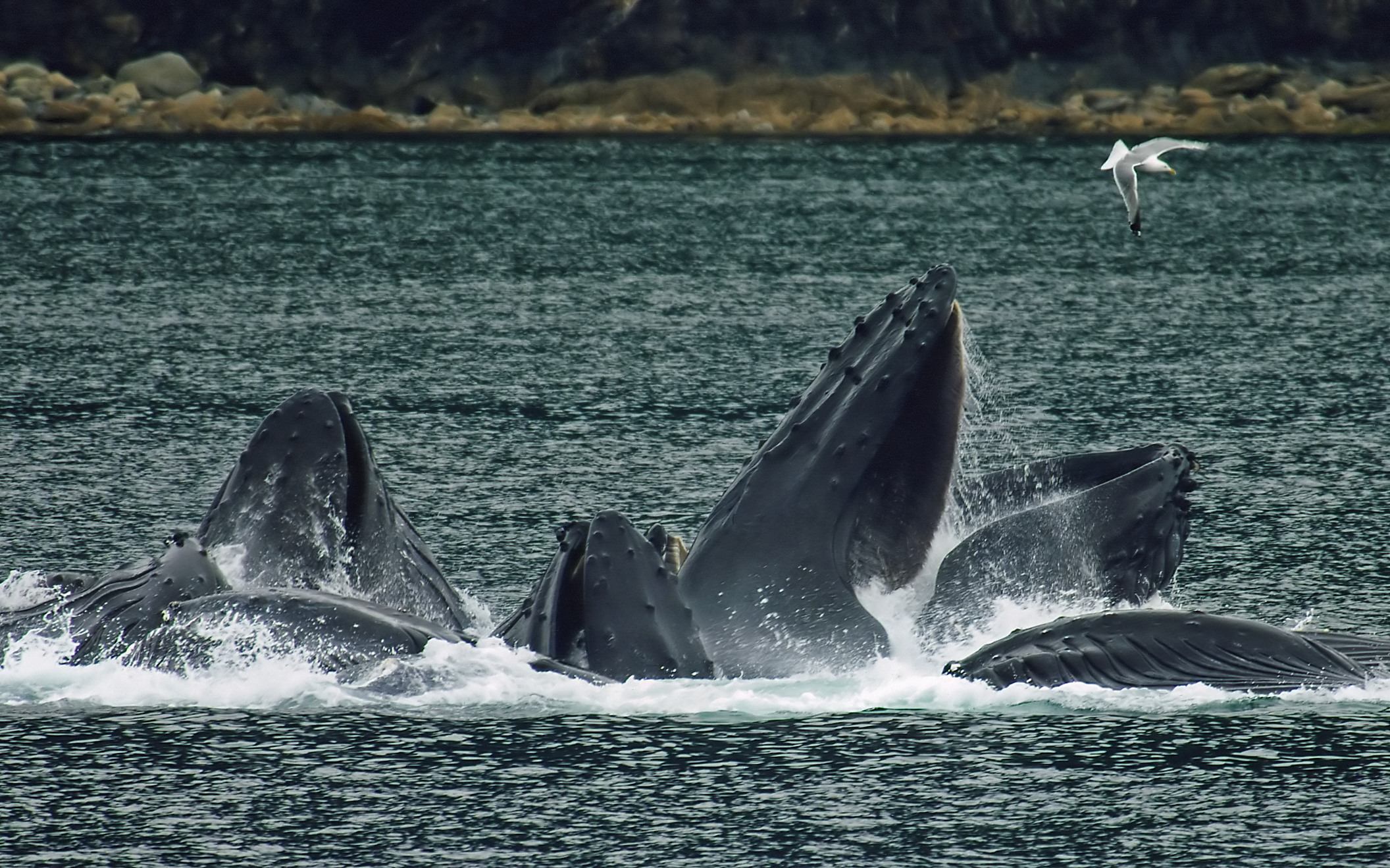
Bubble net feeding

Brain size was previously considered a major indicator of the intelligence of an animal. Since most of the brain is used for maintaining bodily functions, greater ratios of brain-to-body mass may increase the amount of brain mass available for more complex cognitive tasks. Allometric analysis indicates that mammalian brain size scales at approximately the 2/3 or 3/4 exponent of the body mass. Comparison of a particular animal's brain size with the expected brain size based on such allometric analysis provides an encephalisation quotient that can be used as an indication of animal intelligence. Sperm whales have the largest brain mass of any animal on Earth, averaging 8,000 cubic centimetres (490 in^{3}) and 7.8 kilograms (17 lb) in mature males, in comparison to the average human brain which averages 1,450 cubic centimetres (88 in^{3}) in mature males. The brain-to-body mass ratio in some odontocetes, such as belugas and narwhals, is second only to humans.

Small whales engage in complex play behaviour, which includes producing stable underwater toroidal air-core vortex rings or "bubble rings". There are two main methods of producing bubble rings: rapid puffing of a burst of air into the water and allowing it to rise to the surface, forming a ring, or swimming repeatedly in a circle and then stopping to inject air into the helical vortex currents thus formed. They also appear to enjoy biting the vortex-rings, so that these burst into many separate bubbles and then rise quickly to the surface. Some believe this is a means of communication. Whales also produce bubble-nets for the purpose of foraging.

Larger whales are thought, to some degree, to engage in play. The southern right whale, for example, elevates its tail fluke above the water, remaining in the same position for a considerable amount of time. This is known as "sailing". This is most commonly seen off the coast of Argentina and South Africa. Humpback whales display similar behaviour.

=== Life cycle ===
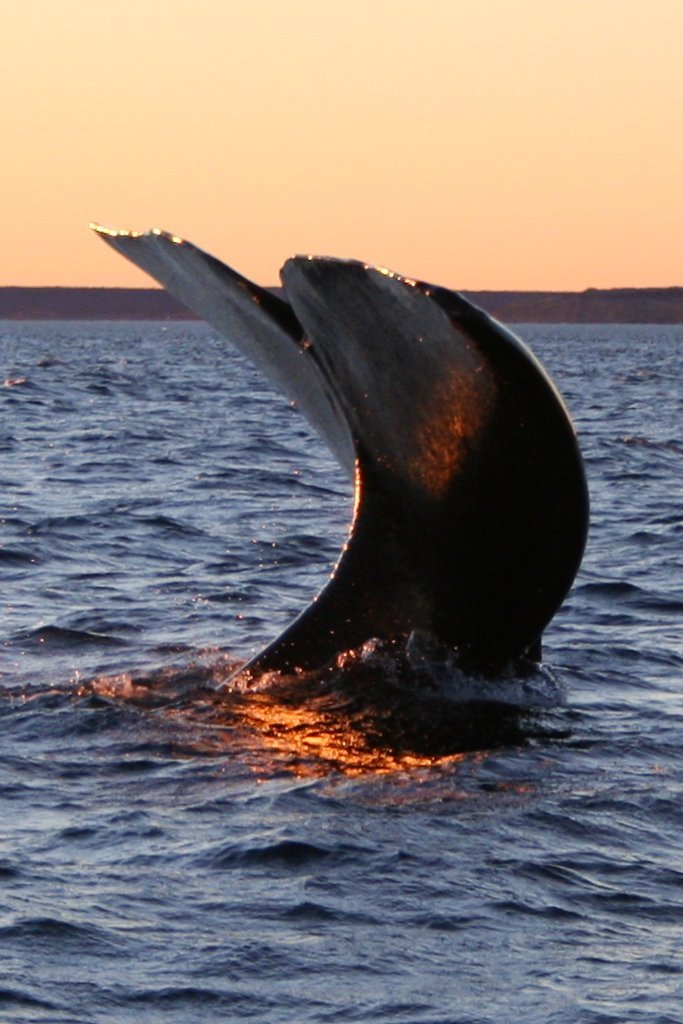
A southern right whale tail-sailing

As with humans, the whale mode of reproduction typically produces but one offspring approximately once each year. This implies ensuring a high probability of survival for each calf with maternal care.

Whales have a typical gestation period of 12 months. Once born, the absolute dependency of the calf upon the mother lasts from one to two years. Sexual maturity is achieved at around seven to ten years of age. The length of the developmental phases of a whale's early life varies between different whale species.

Being mammals, they have mammary glands used for nursing calves. To feed the newborn, whales, being aquatic, must squirt the milk into the mouth of the calf. Nursing can occur while the mother whale is in the vertical or horizontal position. While nursing in the vertical position, a mother whale may sometimes rest with her tail flukes remaining stationary above the water. This position with the flukes above the water is known as "whale-tail-sailing." Not all whale-tail-sailing includes nursing of the young, as whales have also been observed tail-sailing while no calves were present. This milk contains high amounts of fat which is meant to hasten the development of blubber; it contains so much fat that it has the consistency of toothpaste. Weaning occurs at about 11 months of age. Most baleen whales reside near the poles. To prevent the unborn baleen whale calves from dying of frostbite, the baleen mother must migrate to warmer calving/mating grounds. They stay there for months until the calf has developed enough blubber to survive the low temperatures of the poles. Until then, the baleen calves feed on the mother's fatty milk.

With the exception of the humpback whale, the timing of whale migration is largely unknown. Most travel from the Arctic or Antarctic into the tropics to mate, calve, and raise their young during the winter and spring; they return to the poles in the warmer summer months so the calf can continue growing while the mother can continue eating, as they fast in the breeding grounds. An exception to this is the southern right whale, which migrates to Patagonia and western New Zealand to calve; both are well out of the tropics.

=== Sleep ===
Unlike most animals, whales are conscious breathers. All mammals sleep, but whales cannot afford to become unconscious for long because they may drown. While knowledge of sleep in wild cetaceans is limited, toothed cetaceans in captivity have been recorded to sleep with one side of their brain at a time, so that they may swim, breathe consciously, and avoid both predators and social contact during their period of rest.

A 2008 study found that sperm whales sleep in vertical postures just under the surface in passive shallow "drift-dives", generally during the day, during which whales do not respond to passing vessels unless they are in contact, leading to the suggestion that whales possibly sleep during such dives.

== Ecology ==
=== Foraging and predation ===
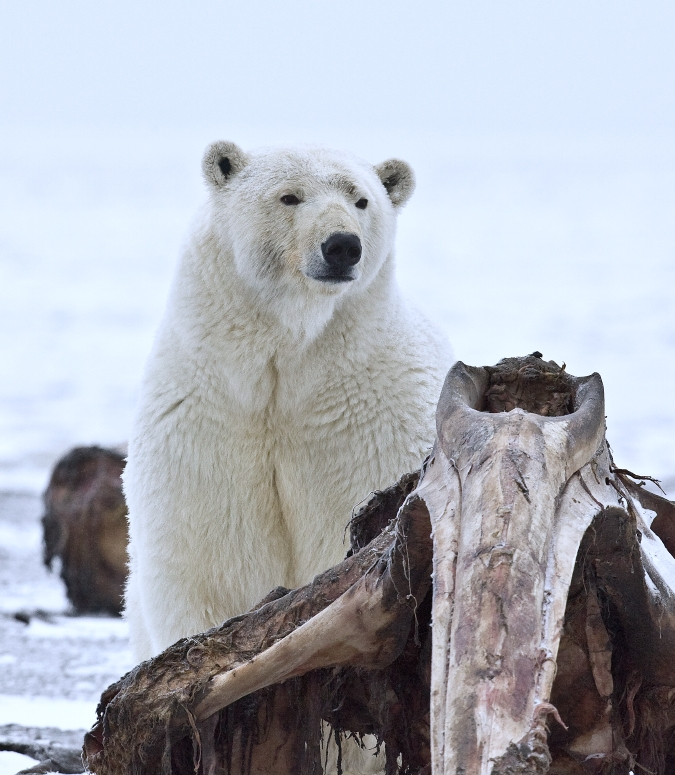
Polar bear with the remains of a beluga

All whales are carnivorous and predatory. Odontocetes, as a whole, mostly feed on fish and cephalopods, and then followed by crustaceans and bivalves. All species are generalist and opportunistic feeders. Mysticetes, as a whole, mostly feed on krill and plankton, followed by crustaceans and other invertebrates. A few are specialists. Examples include the blue whale, which eats almost exclusively krill, the minke whale, which eats mainly schooling fish, the sperm whale, which specialize on squid, and the grey whale which feed on bottom-dwelling invertebrates. The elaborate baleen "teeth" of filter-feeding species, mysticetes, allow them to remove water before they swallow their planktonic food by using the teeth as a sieve. Usually, whales hunt solitarily, but they do sometimes hunt cooperatively in small groups. The former behaviour is typical when hunting non-schooling fish, slow-moving or immobile invertebrates or endothermic prey. When large amounts of prey are available, whales such as certain mysticetes hunt cooperatively in small groups. Some cetaceans may forage with other kinds of animals, such as other species of whales or certain species of pinnipeds.

Large whales, such as mysticetes, are not usually subject to predation, but smaller whales, such as monodontids or ziphiids, are. These species are preyed on by the orca. To subdue and kill whales, orcas continuously ram them with their heads; this can sometimes kill bowhead whales, or severely injure them. Other times they corral the narwhals or belugas before striking. They are typically hunted by groups of 10 or fewer orcas, but they are seldom attacked by an individual. Calves are more commonly taken by orcas, but adults can be targeted as well.

These small whales are also targeted by terrestrial and pagophilic predators. The polar bear is well adapted for hunting Arctic whales and calves. Bears are known to use sit-and-wait tactics as well as active stalking and pursuit of prey on ice or water. Whales lessen the chance of predation by gathering in groups. This however means less room around the breathing hole as the ice slowly closes the gap. When out at sea, whales dive out of the reach of surface-hunting orcas. Polar bear attacks on belugas and narwhals are usually successful in winter, but rarely inflict any damage in summer.

=== Whale pump ===
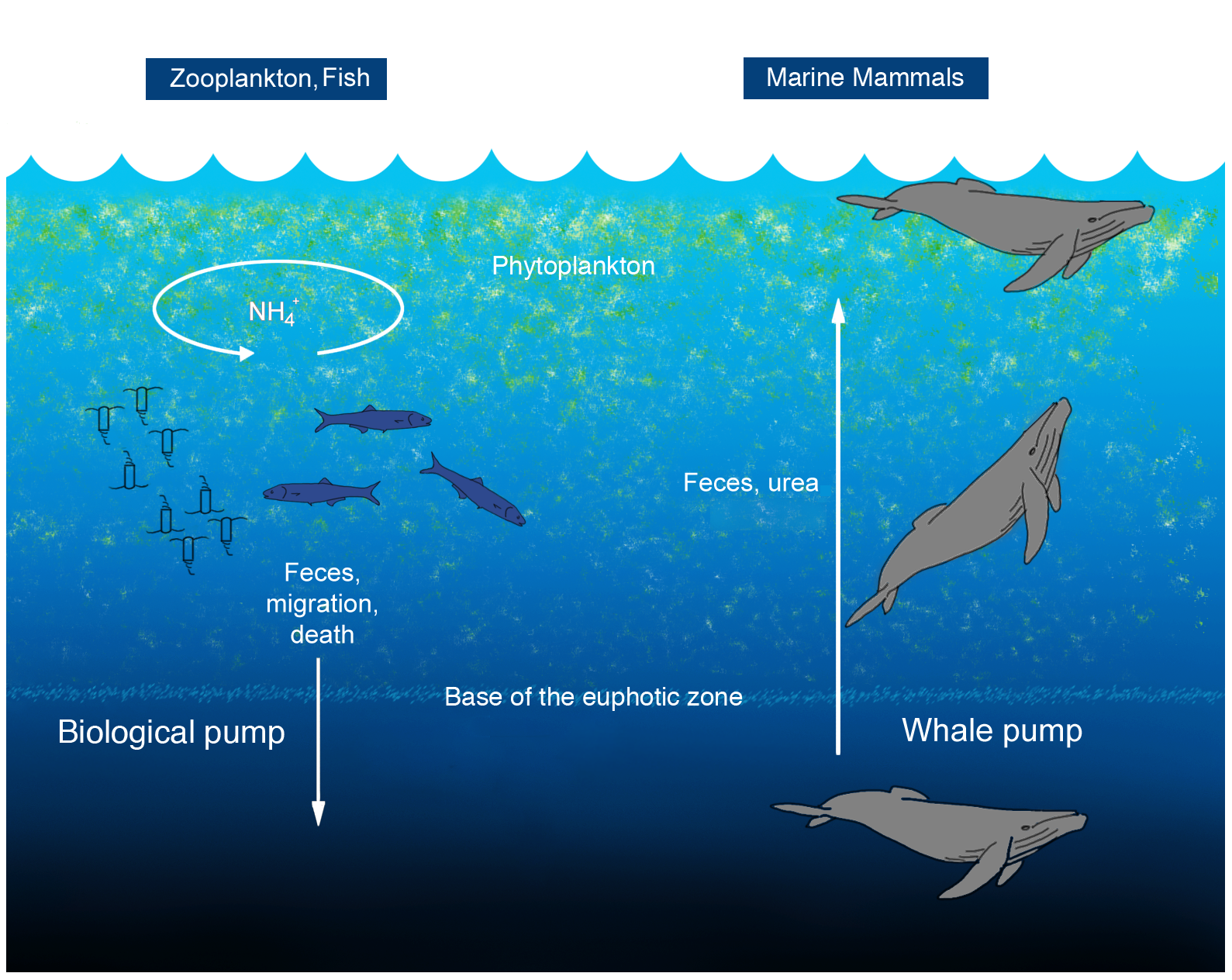
"Whale pump" – the role played by whales in recycling ocean nutrients.

A 2010 study considered whales to be a positive influence to the productivity of ocean fisheries, in what has been termed a "whale pump." Whales carry nutrients such as nitrogen from the depths back to the surface. This functions as an upward biological pump, reversing an earlier presumption that whales accelerate the loss of nutrients to the bottom. This nitrogen input in the Gulf of Maine is "more than the input of all rivers combined" emptying into the gulf, some 23,000 metric tons (25,000 short tons) each year. Whales defecate at the ocean's surface; their excrement is important for fisheries because it is rich in iron and nitrogen. The whale faeces are liquid and instead of sinking, they stay at the surface where phytoplankton feed off it.

=== Whale fall ===
Upon death, whale carcasses fall to the deep ocean and provide a substantial habitat for marine life. Evidence of whale falls in present-day and fossil records shows that deep sea whale falls support a rich assemblage of creatures, with a global diversity of 407 species, comparable to other neritic biodiversity hotspots, such as cold seeps and hydrothermal vents.

Deterioration of whale carcasses happens through a series of three stages. Initially, moving organisms such as sharks and hagfish, scavenge the soft tissues at a rapid rate over a period of months, and as long as two years. This is followed by the colonization of bones and surrounding sediments (which contain organic matter) by enrichment opportunists, such as crustaceans and polychaetes, throughout a period of years. Finally, sulfophilic bacteria reduce the bones releasing hydrogen sulfide enabling the growth of chemoautotrophic organisms, which in turn, support other organisms such as mussels, clams, limpets, and sea snails. This stage may last for decades and supports a rich assemblage of species, averaging 185 species per site.

== Relationship with humans ==
=== Whaling ===
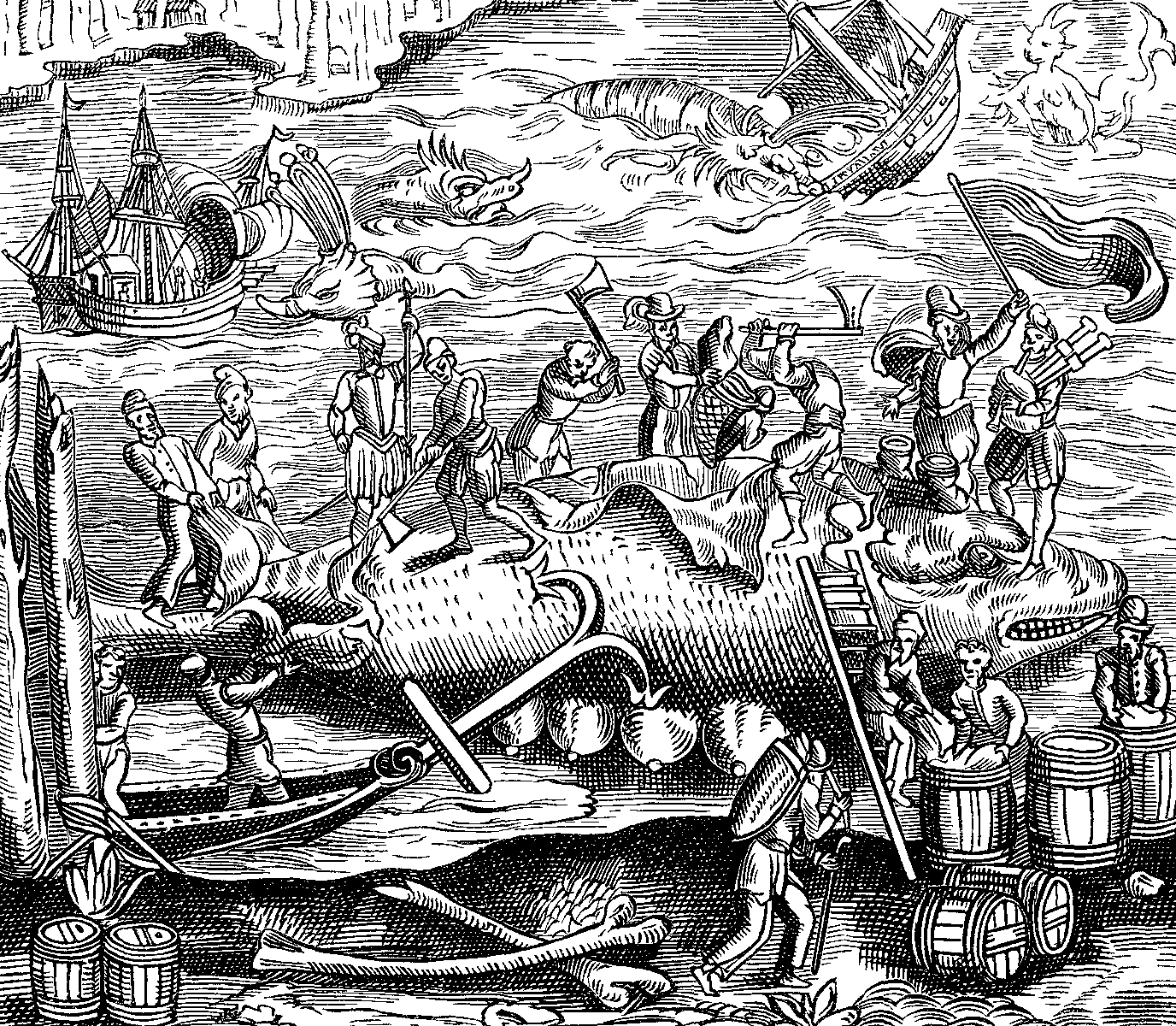
Whale Fishing: Woodcut by Thevet, Paris, 1574

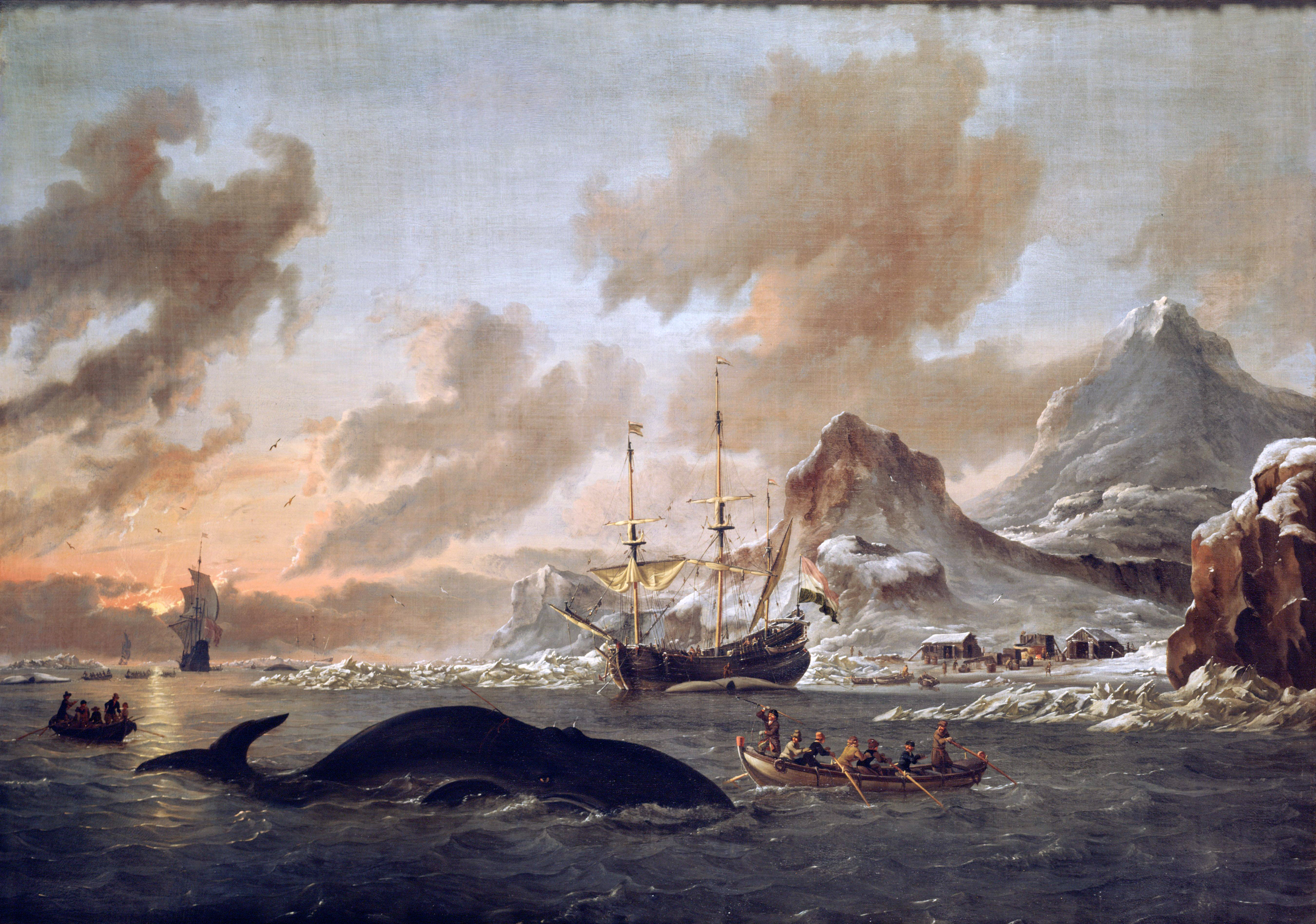
Dutch whalers near Spitsbergen, their most successful port. Abraham Storck, 1690

Whaling by humans has existed since the Stone Age. Ancient whalers used harpoons to spear the bigger animals from boats out at sea. People from Norway and Japan started hunting whales around 2000 B.C. Whales are typically hunted for their meat and blubber by aboriginal groups; they used baleen for baskets or roofing, and made tools and masks out of bones. The Inuit hunted whales in the Arctic Ocean. The Basques started whaling as early as the 11th century, sailing as far as Newfoundland in the 16th century in search of right whales. 18th- and 19th-century whalers hunted whales mainly for their oil, which was used as lamp fuel and a lubricant, baleen or whalebone, which was used for items such as corsets and skirt hoops, and ambergris, which was used as a fixative for perfumes. The most successful whaling nations at this time were the Netherlands, Japan, and the United States.

Commercial whaling was historically important as an industry well throughout the 17th, 18th and 19th centuries. Whaling was at that time a sizeable European industry with ships from Britain, France, Spain, Denmark, the Netherlands and Germany, sometimes collaborating to hunt whales in the Arctic, sometimes in competition leading even to war. By the early 1790s, whalers, namely the Americans and Australians, focused efforts in the South Pacific where they mainly hunted sperm whales and right whales, with catches of up to 39,000 right whales by Americans alone. By 1853, US profits reached US$11m (£6.5m), equivalent to US$348m (£230m) today, the most profitable year for the American whaling industry. Commonly exploited species included North Atlantic right whales, sperm whales, which were mainly hunted by Americans, bowhead whales, which were mainly hunted by the Dutch, common minke whales, blue whales, and grey whales. The scale of whale harvesting decreased substantially after 1982 when the International Whaling Commission (IWC) placed a moratorium which set a catch limit for each country, excluding aboriginal groups until 2004.

Current whaling nations are Norway, Iceland, and Japan, despite their membership of the IWC, as well as the aboriginal communities of Siberia, Alaska, and northern Canada. Subsistence hunters typically use whale products for themselves and depend on them for survival. National and international authorities have given special treatment to aboriginal hunters since their methods of hunting are seen as less destructive and wasteful. This distinction is being questioned as these aboriginal groups are using more modern weaponry and mechanized transport to hunt with, and have started to sell whale products. Some anthropologists argue that the term "subsistence" should apply to these cash-based exchanges as long as they take place within local production and consumption. In 1946, the IWC placed a moratorium, limiting the annual whale catch. Since then, yearly profits for these "subsistence" hunters have been close to US$31m (£20m) per year.

=== Other threats ===
Whales can also be threatened by humans more indirectly. They are unintentionally caught in fishing nets by commercial fisheries as bycatch and accidentally swallow fishing hooks. Gillnetting and seine netting is a significant cause of mortality in whales and other marine mammals. Whales also become entangled in abandoned or lost fishing gear, shark nets, and the ropes attached to lobster or crab pots. For some species, like the North Atlantic right whale, entanglement is one of the leading causes of mortality. Whales are also affected by marine pollution. High levels of organic chemicals accumulate in these animals since they are high in the food chain. They have large reserves of blubber, more so for toothed whales as they are higher up the food chain than baleen whales. Lactating mothers can pass the toxins on to their young. These pollutants can cause gastrointestinal cancers and greater vulnerability to infectious diseases. They can also be poisoned by swallowing litter, such as plastic bags. Advanced military sonar harms whales. Sonar interferes with the basic biological functions of whales—such as feeding and mating—by impacting their ability to echolocate. Whales swim in response to sonar and sometimes experience decompression sickness due to rapid changes in depth. Mass strandings have been triggered by sonar activity, resulting in injury or death. Whales are sometimes killed or injured during collisions with ships or boats. This is considered to be a significant threat to vulnerable whale populations such as the North Atlantic right whale, whose total population numbers less than 500. It is believed that up to two thirds of whale-ship collisions are not reported; either because they are not noticed in large ships, they occur at night or during conditions of adverse weather or some other reasons. From 2013 up to at least 2023 Chile has been the country in the world with most registered fatal whale-ship collisions.

=== Conservation ===
Whaling decreased substantially after 1946 when, in response to the steep decline in whale populations, the International Whaling Commission placed a moratorium which set a catch limit for each country; this excluded aboriginal groups up until 2004. As of 2015, aboriginal communities are allowed to take 280 bowhead whales off Alaska and two from the western coast of Greenland, 620 grey whales off Washington state, three common minke whales off the eastern coast of Greenland and 178 on their western coast, 10 fin whales from the west coast of Greenland, nine humpback whales from the west coast of Greenland and 20 off St. Vincent and the Grenadines each year. Several species that were commercially exploited have rebounded in numbers; for example, grey whales may be as numerous as they were prior to harvesting, but the North Atlantic population is functionally extinct. Conversely, the North Atlantic right whale was extirpated from much of its former range, which stretched across the North Atlantic, and only remains in small fragments along the coast of Canada, Greenland, and is considered functionally extinct along the European coastline.

The IWC has designated two whale sanctuaries: the Southern Ocean Whale Sanctuary, and the Indian Ocean Whale Sanctuary. The Southern Ocean whale sanctuary spans 30,560,860 square kilometres (11,799,610 sq mi) and envelopes Antarctica. The Indian Ocean whale sanctuary takes up all of the Indian Ocean south of 55°S.

At least 86 cetacean species are recognized by the International Whaling Commission Scientific Committee. As of 2020, six are considered at risk, as they are ranked "Critically Endangered" (North Atlantic right whale), "Endangered" (blue whale, North Pacific right whale, and sei whale,) and "Vulnerable" (fin whale and sperm whale). Twenty-one species have a "Data Deficient" ranking. Species that live in polar habitats are vulnerable to the effects of recent and ongoing climate change, particularly the time when pack ice forms and melts.

World population graph of blue whales

World map showing International Whaling Commission (IWC) members in blue

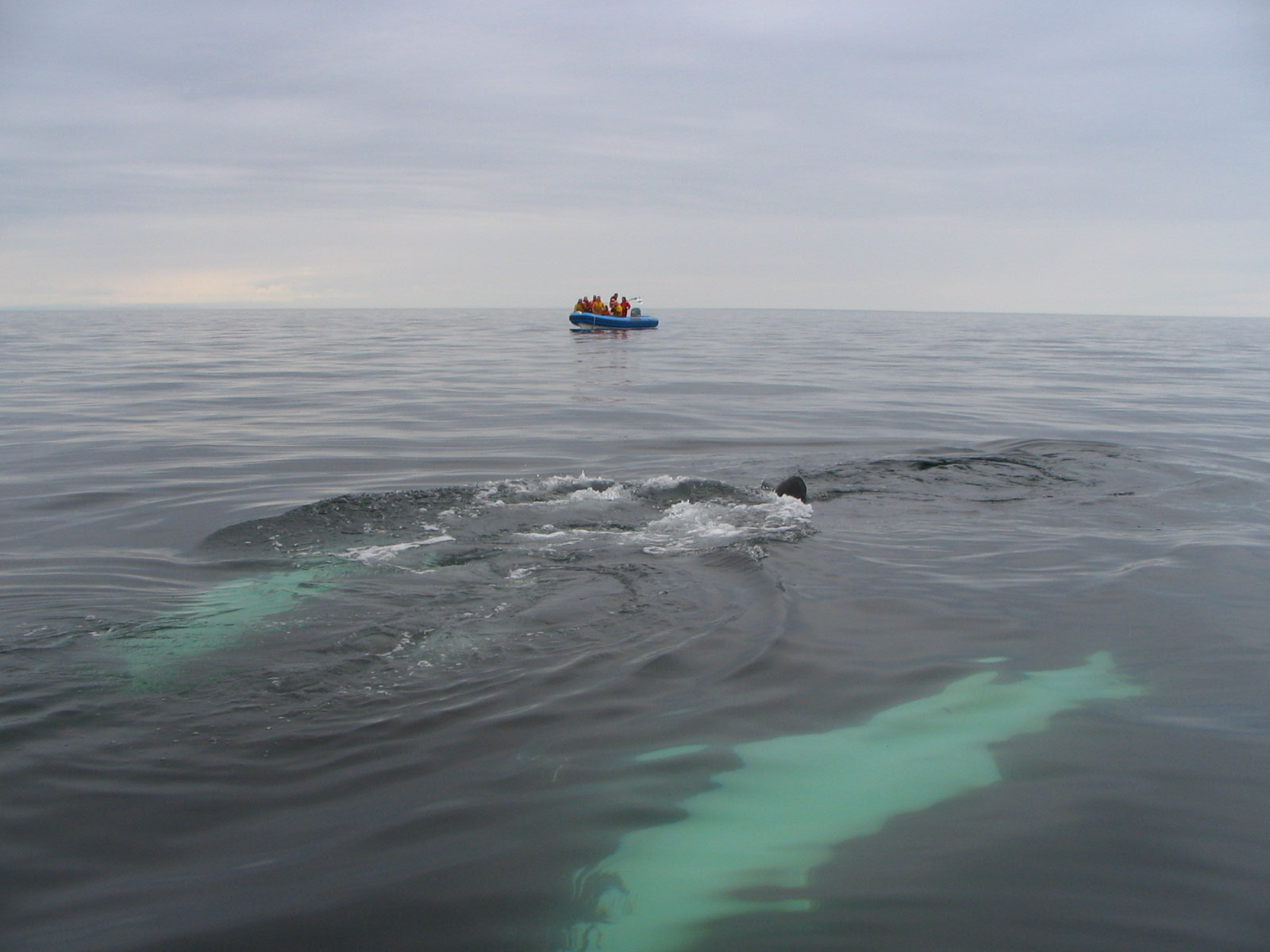
Whale Research Expeditions by Mingan Island Cetacean Study (MICS),
Gulf of St. Lawrence, Canada

=== Whale watching ===
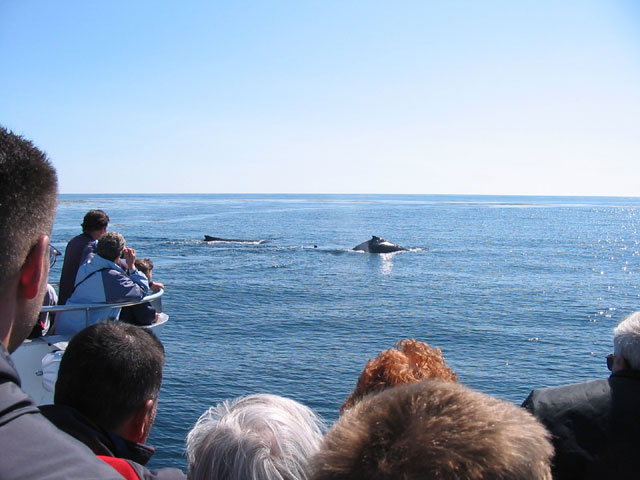
Whale watching off Bar Harbor, Maine

An estimated 13 million people went whale watching globally in 2008, in all oceans except the Arctic. Rules and codes of conduct have been created to minimize harassment of the whales. Iceland, Japan and Norway have both whaling and whale watching industries. Whale watching lobbyists are concerned that the most inquisitive whales, which approach boats closely and provide much of the entertainment on whale-watching trips, will be the first to be taken if whaling is resumed in the same areas. Whale watching generated US$2.1 billion (£1.4 billion) per annum in tourism revenue worldwide, employing around 13,000 workers. In contrast, the whaling industry, with the moratorium in place, generates US$31 million (£20 million) per year.

=== In myth, literature and art ===
Whales played a major part in shaping the art forms of many coastal civilizations, such as the Norse, with some dating to the Stone Age. Petroglyphs off a cliff face in Bangudae, South Korea show 300 depictions of various animals, a third of which are whales. Some show particular detail in which there are throat pleats, typical of rorquals. These petroglyphs show these people, of around 7,000 to 3,500 B.C.E. in South Korea, were highly dependent on whales. The Pacific Islanders and Aboriginal Australians viewed whales as bringers of good and joy. One exception is French Polynesia, where cetaceans are often met with brutality.

In coastal regions of China, Korea and Vietnam, the worship of whale gods, who were associated with Dragon Kings after the arrival of Buddhism, was present along with related legends. In Thailand, the most common whales found are the Bryde's whale. Thai fishermen call them Pla pu (Thai: ปลาปู่; pronounced [plāː puː]), "grandfather fish", and do not hunt them. In Vietnam, whales hold a sense of divinity; funerals are sometimes held for beached whales, a custom deriving from Vietnam's ancient sea-based Champa Kingdom.

Whales play a role in sacred texts. The story of Jonah being swallowed by a great fish is told both in the Qur'an and in the biblical Book of Jonah (and is mentioned by Jesus in the New Testament: Matthew 12:40.). This episode was frequently depicted in medieval art (for example, on a 12th-century column capital at the abbey church of Mozac, France). The "leviathan" described at length in Job 41:1-34 is generally understood to refer to a whale. The "sea monsters" in Lamentations 4:3 have been taken by some to refer to marine mammals, in particular whales, although most modern versions use the word "jackals" instead.

Harpooned and entangled whales, particularly the sperm whale, may have been responsible for well-known sea serpent sightings.

In 1585, Alessandro Farnese, 1585, and Francois, Duke of Anjou, 1582, were greeted on his ceremonial entry into the port city of Antwerp by floats including "Neptune and the Whale", indicating at least the city's dependence on the sea for its wealth. In 1896, an article in The Pall Mall Gazette popularised a practice of alternative medicine that probably began in the whaling town of Eden, Australia two or three years earlier. It was believed that climbing inside a whale carcass and remaining there for a few hours would relieve symptoms of rheumatism.

Whales are prevalent in modern literature. Herman Melville's Moby Dick features a "great white whale" as the main antagonist for Ahab. The tale is partly based on historical events, including the albino sperm whale Mocha Dick. Rudyard Kipling's Just So Stories includes the story of "How the Whale got in his Throat". A whale features in the award-winning children's book The Snail and the Whale (2003) by Julia Donaldson and Axel Scheffler.

Niki Caro's film the Whale Rider has a Māori girl ride a whale in her journey to be a suitable heir to the chieftain-ship. Walt Disney's film Pinocchio features a showdown with a giant whale named Monstro at the end of the film, voiced by Thurl Ravenscroft.

A recording of Song with a Humpback Whale by a team of marine scientists became popular in 1970. Alan Hovhaness's orchestral composition And God Created Great Whales (1970) includes the recorded sounds of humpback and bowhead whales.

The concept of an extraterrestrial "space whale" appears in art and media, first popularized in the 1970s, comparing the expanse of the ocean to the void of outer space.

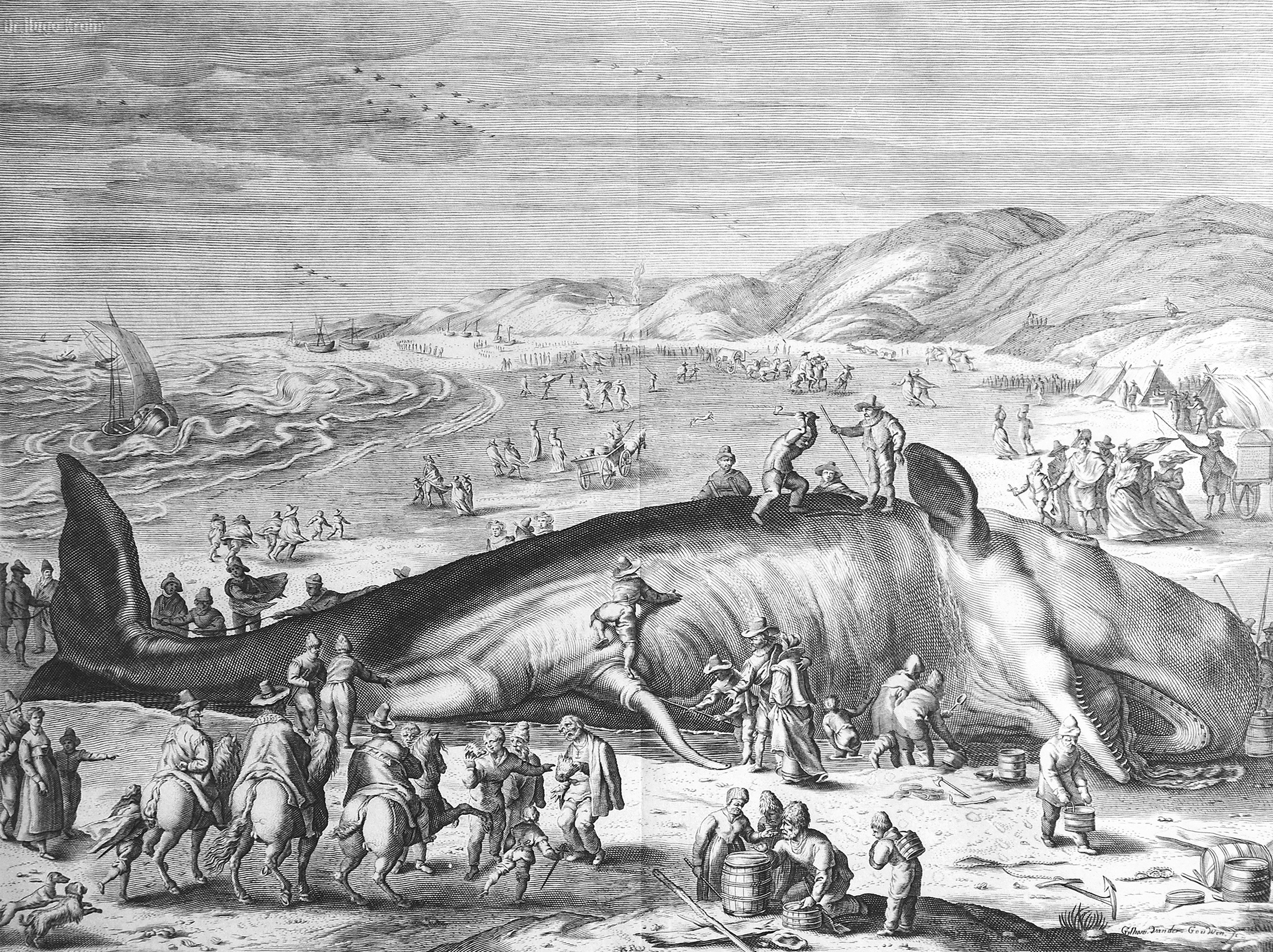
Engraving by Gilliam van der Gouwen depicting a stranded sperm whale being butchered on the Dutch coast, 1598

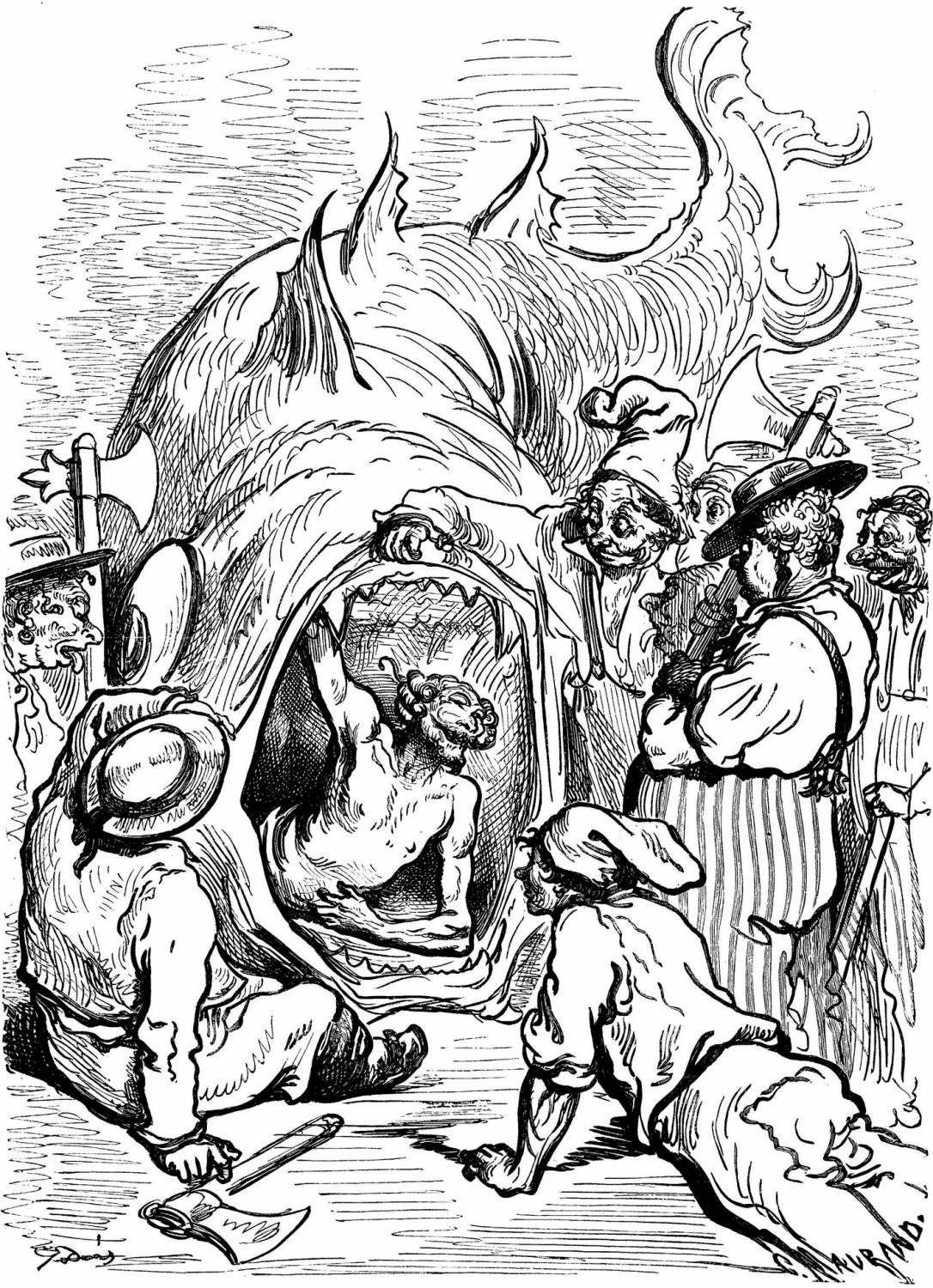
Illustration by Gustave Doré of Baron Munchausen's tale of being swallowed by a whale

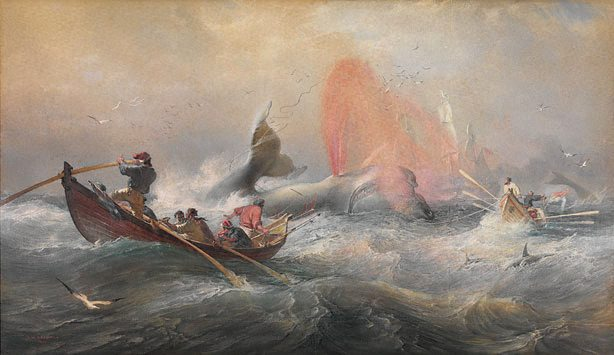
Whalers off Twofold Bay, New South Wales. Watercolour by Oswald Brierly, 1867

=== In captivity ===
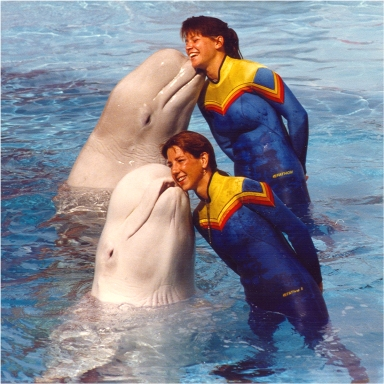
Beluga whales and trainers in an aquarium

Belugas were the first whales to be kept in captivity. The first beluga was shown at Barnum's Museum in New York City in 1861. For most of the 20th century, Canada was the predominant source of wild belugas, followed by Russia when the practice was banned in Canada. Most captive belugas are caught in the wild, since captive-breeding has had limited success.

Between 1960 and 1992, the Navy studied marine mammals' abilities with sonar, using dolphins and then belugas, to improve the detection of underwater objects. A similar program was used by the Russian Navy during the Cold War, in which belugas were also trained for antimining operations in the Arctic.

As of 2006, 30 belugas were in Canada and 28 in the United States, and 42 deaths in captivity had been reported up to that time. Aquariums have tried housing other species of whales such as narwhal, Sowerby's beaked whale, grey whale, and minke whale in captivity, often unsuccessfully.

== See also ==
- List of individual cetaceans
- Whaling in Japan
- Whaling in Norway
- Whaling in Iceland

== Bibliography ==
=== Books ===
- Björgvinsson, Ásbjörn; Lugmayr, Helmut; Camm, Martin; Skaptason, Jón (2002). Whale watching in Iceland. ISBN 978-9979-761-55-6.
- Beland, Pierre (1996). Beluga: A Farewell to Whales (1st ed.). The Lyons Press. p. 224. ISBN 978-1-55821-398-2.
- Dawkins, Richard (2004). The Ancestor's Tale, A Pilgrimage to the Dawn of Life. Houghton Mifflin. ISBN 978-0-618-00583-3.
- Gormley, Gerard (1990). Orcas of the Gulf: A Natural History. Lincoln, NE: toExcel. ISBN 978-0-595-01118-6.
- Kennedy, Robert; Perrin, W.F.; Wursig, B.; Thewissen, J. G. M. (2008). "Right whales (E. glacialis, E. japonica, and E. australis". Encyclopedia of Marine Mammals. ISBN 978-0-12-373553-9.
- Ketten, Darlene R. (1992). "The Marine Mammal Ear: Specializations for Aquatic Audition and Echolocation". In Webster, Douglas B.; Fay, Richard R.; Popper, Arthur N. (eds.). The Evolutionary Biology of Hearing. Springer–Verlag. pp. 717–750. doi:10.1007/978-1-4612-2784-7_44. ISBN 978-1-4612-7668-5.
- Klinowska, Margaret (1991). Dolphins, Porpoises, and Whales of the World: the IUCN Red Data Book (PDF). Columbia University Press, NY: IUCN Publications. ISBN 978-2-88032-936-5.
- Mack, John (2013). The Sea: a cultural history. Reaktion Books. pp. 205–206. ISBN 978-1-78023-184-6.
- Mann, Janet; Connor, Richard C.; Tyack, Peter L.; Whitehead, Hal, eds. (2000). Cetacean Societies: Field Studies of Dolphins and Whales. University of Chicago. p. 9. ISBN 978-0-226-50341-7.
- McBrearty, D. (1991). "Records of 'blackfish' (killer, false killer, pilot, pygmy killer, and melon-headed whales) in the Indian Ocean Sanctuary, 1772–1986". In Leatherwood, S.; Donovan, G.P. (eds.). Cetaceans and cetacean research in the Indian Ocean Sanctuary. Marine Mammal Technical Report. Vol. 3. Nairobi: UNEP. pp. 33–65. OCLC 28388647.
- Mead, J.G.; Brownell, R.L. Jr. (2005). "Order Cetacea". Mammal Species of the World: A Taxonomic and Geographic Reference. Johns Hopkins University Press. pp. 723–743. ISBN 978-0-8018-8221-0.
- Nemoto, T.; Okiyama, M.; Iwasaki, N.; Kikuchi, T. (1988). "Squid as Predators on Krill (Euphausia superba) and Prey for Sperm Whales in the Southern Ocean". In Dietrich Sahrhage (ed.). Antarctic Ocean and Resources Variability. Springer Berlin Heidelberg. pp. 292–296. doi:10.1007/978-3-642-73724-4_25. ISBN 978-3-642-73726-8.
- Proulx, Jean-Pierre (1994). Basque whaling in Labrador in the 16th century. National Historic Sites, Parks Service, Environment Canada. pp. 260–286. ISBN 978-0-660-14819-9.
- Ralls, Katherine; Mesnick, Sarah (1984). "Sexual Dimorphism" ( (PDF)). Encyclopedia of Marine Mammals (2nd ed.). San Diego: Academic Press. pp. 1005–1011. ISBN 978-0-08-091993-5. Archived from the original on 25 July 2019.
- Riedman, M. (1991). The Pinnipeds: Seals, Sea Lions, and Walruses. University of California Press. p. 168. ISBN 978-0-520-06498-0.
- Skeat, Walter W. (1898). An Etymological Dictionary of the English Language (3rd ed.). Clarendon Press. p. 704.
- Stevens, C. Edward; Hume, Ian D. (1995). Comparative Physiology of the Vertebrate Digestive System. Cambridge University Press. ISBN 978-0-521-44418-7.
- Thewissen, J. G. M.; Perrin, William R.; Wirsig, Bernd (2002). "Hearing". Encyclopedia of Marine Mammals. San Diego: Academic Press. pp. 570–572. ISBN 978-0-12-551340-1.
- Thomas, Jeanette A.; Kastelein, Ronald A. (1990). Sensory Abilities of Cetaceans: Laboratory and Field Evidence. Vol. 196. New York: Springer Science & Business Media. doi:10.1007/978-1-4899-0858-2. ISBN 978-1-4899-0860-5. S2CID 32801659.
- Tonnessen, J.N.; Johnsen, A.O (1982). The History of Modern Whaling. C. Hurst. ISBN 978-0-905838-23-6.
- Whitehead, H. (2003). Sperm Whales: Social Evolution in the Ocean. Chicago: University of Chicago Press. p. 4. ISBN 978-0-226-89518-5.

=== Articles ===
- Bebej, R. M.; ul-Haq, M.; Zalmout, I. S.; Gingerich, P. D. (June 2012). "Morphology and Function of the Vertebral Column in Remingtonocetus domandaensis (Mammalia, cetacea) from the Middle Eocene Domanda Formation of Pakistan". Journal of Mammalian Evolution. 19 (2): 77–104. doi:10.1007/S10914-011-9184-8. ISSN 1064-7554. S2CID 17810850.
- Boisserie, Jean-Renaud; Lihoreau, Fabrice; Brunet, Michel (2005). "The position of Hippopotamidae within Cetartiodactyla". Proceedings of the National Academy of Sciences. 102 (5): 1537–1541. Bibcode:2005PNAS..102.1537B. doi:10.1073/pnas.0409518102. PMC 547867. PMID 15677331.
- Clapham, Phillip J.; Young, Sharon B.; Brownell Jr., Robert L. (1999). "Baleen whales: conservation issues and the status of the most endangered populations". Mammal Review. 29 (1): 35–60. Bibcode:1999MamRv..29...37C. doi:10.1046/j.1365-2907.1999.00035.x.
- Cranford, T.W.; Krysl, P.; Hildebrand, J.A. (2008). "Acoustic pathways revealed: simulated sound transmission and reception in Cuvier's beaked whale (Ziphius cavirostris)". Bioinspiration & Biomimetics. 3 (1). 016001. Bibcode:2008BiBi....3a6001C. doi:10.1088/1748-3182/3/1/016001. PMID 18364560. S2CID 26098966.
- Cooke JG (2018a). "Balaenoptera borealis". IUCN Red List of Threatened Species. 2018a. e.T2475A130482064. doi:10.2305/IUCN.UK.2018-2.RLTS.T2475A130482064.en.
- Cooke JG (2019) [errata version of 2018 assessment]. "Balaenoptera musculus". IUCN Red List of Threatened Species. 2018. e.T2477A156923585. doi:10.2305/IUCN.UK.2018-2.RLTS.T2477A156923585.en.
- Cooke JG (2018c). "Balaenoptera physalus". IUCN Red List of Threatened Species. 2018c. e.T2478A50349982. doi:10.2305/IUCN.UK.2018-2.RLTS.T2478A50349982.en.
- Cooke JG (2020) [errata version of 2020 assessment]. "Eubalaena glacialis". IUCN Red List of Threatened Species. 2020. e.T41712A178589687. doi:10.2305/IUCN.UK.2020-2.RLTS.T41712A178589687.en.
- Cooke JG, Clapham PJ (2018). "Eubalaena japonica". IUCN Red List of Threatened Species. 2018. e.T41711A50380694. doi:10.2305/IUCN.UK.2018-1.RLTS.T41711A50380694.en.
- Whitehead H, Barlow J, Dawson SM, Eguiguren A, Miller B, Shabangu, F (2025). "Physeter macrocephalus". IUCN Red List of Threatened Species. 2025. e.T41755A50382216. doi:10.2305/IUCN.UK.2025-2.RLTS.T41755A50382216.en.
- Cressey, Jason (1998). "Making a Splash in the Pacific Ocean: Dolphin and Whale Myths and Legends of Oceania" (PDF). Rapa Nui Journal. 12: 75–84. Archived from the original (PDF) on 20 November 2018.
- Fahlke, Julia M.; Gingerich, Philip D.; Welsh, Robert C.; Wood, Aaron R. (2011). "Cranial asymmetry in Eocene archaeocete whales and the evolution of directional hearing in water". Proceedings of the National Academy of Sciences. 108 (35): 14545–14548. Bibcode:2011PNAS..10814545F. doi:10.1073/pnas.1108927108. PMC 3167538. PMID 21873217.
- Fujiwara, Yoshihiro; et al. (16 February 2007). "Three-year investigations into sperm whale-fall ecosystems in Japan". Marine Ecology. 28 (1): 219–230. Bibcode:2007MarEc..28..219F. doi:10.1111/j.1439-0485.2007.00150.x.
- Gatesy, J. (1997). "More DNA support for a Cetacea/Hippopotamidae clade: the blood-clotting protein gene gamma-fibrinogen". Molecular Biology and Evolution. 14 (5): 537–543. doi:10.1093/oxfordjournals.molbev.a025790. PMID 9159931.
- Goldbogen, Jeremy A. (2010). "The Ultimate Mouthful: Lunge Feeding in Rorqual Whales". American Scientist. 98 (2): 124–131. doi:10.1511/2010.83.124. Archived from the original on 28 October 2016.
- Hof, Patrick R.; Van Der Gucht, Estel (2007). "Structure of the cerebral cortex of the humpback whale, Megaptera novaeangliae (Cetacea, Mysticeti, Balaenopteridae)". The Anatomical Record. 290 (1): 1–31. doi:10.1002/ar.20407. PMID 17441195. S2CID 15460266.
- Houben, A. J. P.; Bijl, P. K.; Pross, J.; Bohaty, S. M.; Passchier, S.; Stickley, C. E.; Rohl, U.; Sugisaki, S.; Tauxe, L.; van de Flierdt, T.; Olney, M.; Sangiorgi, F.; Sluijs, A.; Escutia, C.; Brinkhuis, H. (2013). "Reorganization of Southern Ocean Plankton Ecosystem at the Onset of Antarctic Glaciation". Science. 340 (6130): 341–344. Bibcode:2013Sci...340..341H. doi:10.1126/science.1223646. hdl:1874/385683. PMID 23599491. S2CID 30549019.
- Johnson, James H.; Wolman, Allen A. (1984). "The Humpback Whale Megaptera novaeangliae" (PDF). Marine Fisheries Review. 46 (4): 30–37. Archived from the original (PDF) on 25 September 2015.
- Jøn, A. Asbjørn (2014). "The whale road: Transitioning from spiritual links, to whaling, to whale watching in Aotearoa New Zealand". Australian Folklore: A Yearly Journal of Folklore Studies (29).
- Laidre KL, Stirling I, Lowry LF, Wiig Ø, Heide-Jørgensen MP, Ferguson SH (2008). "Quantifying the sensitivity of Arctic marine mammals to climate-induced habitat change". Ecological Applications. 18 (2 Suppl): S97–S125. Bibcode:2008EcoAp..18S..97L. doi:10.1890/06-0546.1. PMID 18494365.
- Lee Soon Ae (1999). 護る神から守られる神へ: 韓国とベトナムの鯨神信仰を中心に [From Gods Who Protect To The Gods Who Are Protected: Focusing on Korean and Vietnamese worship of whale gods (?)] (Report). 国立民族学博物館調査報告 [National Museum of Ethnology Research Report] (in Japanese). Vol. 149. pp. 195–212.
- Leighton, Tim; Finfer, Dan; Grover, Ed; White, Paul (2007). "An acoustical hypothesis for the spiral bubble nets of humpback whales, and the implications for whale feeding" (PDF). Acoustics Bulletin. 32 (1): 17–21.
- Lydersen, Christian; Weslawski, Jan Marcin; Øritsland, Nils Are (1991). "Stomach content analysis of minke whales Balaenoptera acutorostrata from the Lofoten and Vesterålen areas, Norway". Ecography. 1 (3): 219–222. Bibcode:1991Ecogr..14..219L. doi:10.1111/j.1600-0587.1991.tb00655.x.
- Mass, Alla; Supin, Alexander (21 May 2007). "Adaptive features of aquatic mammals' eyes". Anatomical Record. 290 (6): 701–715. doi:10.1002/ar.20529. PMID 17516421. S2CID 39925190.
- Miller, P. J. O.; Aoki, K.; Rendell, L. E.; Amano, M. (2008). "Stereotypical resting behavior of the sperm whale". Current Biology. 18 (1): R21–R23. Bibcode:2008CBio...18..R21M. doi:10.1016/j.cub.2007.11.003. PMID 18177706. S2CID 10587736.
- Morrel, Virginia (30 January 2012). "Killer Whale Menu Finally Revealed". Science.
- Morseth, C. Michele (1997). "Twentieth-Century Changes in Beluga Whale Hunting and Butchering by the Kaηiġmiut of Buckland, Alaska". Arctic. 50 (3): 241–255. doi:10.14430/arctic1106. JSTOR 40511703.
- Norena, S. R.; Williams, T. M. (2000). "Body size and skeletal muscle myoglobin of cetaceans: adaptations for maximizing dive duration". Comparative Biochemistry and Physiology A. 126 (2): 181–191. Bibcode:2000CmpBP.126..181N. doi:10.1016/S1095-6433(00)00182-3. PMID 10936758.
- Nummela, Sirpa; Thewissen, J.G.M; Bajpai, Sunil; Hussain, Taseer; Kumar, Kishor (2007). "Sound transmission in archaic and modern whales: Anatomical adaptations for underwater hearing" (PDF). The Anatomical Record. 290 (6): 716–733. doi:10.1002/ar.20528. PMID 17516434. S2CID 12140889.
- Piantadosi, C. A.; Thalmann, E. D. (2004). "Pathology: whales, sonar and decompression sickness". Nature. 428 (6894): 716–718. doi:10.1038/nature02527a. PMID 15085881. S2CID 4391838.
- Reidenberg, Joy S. (2007). "Anatomical adaptations of aquatic mammals". The Anatomical Record. 290 (6): 507–513. doi:10.1002/ar.20541. PMID 17516440. S2CID 42133705.
- Roman, J.; McCarthy, J. J. (October 2010). "The Whale Pump: Marine Mammals Enhance Primary Productivity in a Coastal Basin". PLOS ONE. 5 (10) e13255. Bibcode:2010PLoSO...513255R. doi:10.1371/journal.pone.0013255. PMC 2952594. PMID 20949007.
- Roman J, Estes JA, Morissette L, Smith C, Costa D, McCarthy J, Nation JB, Nicol S, Pershing A, Smetacek V (2014). "Whales as marine ecosystem engineers". Frontiers in Ecology and the Environment. 12 (7): 377–385. Bibcode:2014FrEE...12..377R. doi:10.1890/130220.
- Rommel, S. A.; et al. (2023). "Elements of beaked whale anatomy and diving physiology and some hypothetical causes of sonar-related stranding" (PDF). Journal of Cetacean Research and Management. 7 (3): 189–209. doi:10.47536/jcrm.v7i3.730. S2CID 32951311. Archived from the original (PDF) on 10 June 2010.
- Rose, Kenneth D. (2001). "The Ancestry of Whales" (PDF). Science. 293 (5538): 2216–2217. doi:10.1126/science.1065305. PMID 11567127. S2CID 82651628.
- Scholander, Per Fredrik (1940). "Experimental investigations on the respiratory function in diving mammals and birds". Hvalraadets Skrifter. 22: 1–131.
- Schrope, Mark (2003). "Whale deaths caused by US Navy's sonar". Nature. 415 (6868): 106. Bibcode:2002Natur.415..106S. doi:10.1038/415106a. PMID 11805797.
- Smith, Craig R.; Baco, Amy R. (2003). "Ecology of Whale Falls at the Deep-Sea Floor" (PDF). Oceanography and Marine Biology: An Annual Review. 41: 311–354.
- Smith, Thomas G.; Sjare, Becky (1990). "Predation of Belugas and Narwhals by Polar Bears in Nearshore Areas of the Canadian High Arctic" (PDF). Arctic. 43 (2): 99–102. Bibcode:1990Arcti..43c1597S. doi:10.14430/arctic1597. Archived from the original (PDF) on 8 September 2015.
- Steeman ME, Hebsgaard MB, Fordyce RE, Ho SYW, Rabosky DL, Nielsen R, Rahbek C, Glenner H, Sorensen MV, Willerslev E (2009). "Radiation of Extant Cetaceans Driven by Restructuring of the Oceans". Systematic Biology. 58 (6): 573–585. doi:10.1093/sysbio/syp060. PMC 2777972. PMID 20525610.
- Thewissen, J. G. M.; Cooper, L. N.; Clementz, M. T.; Bajpai, S.; Tiwari, B. N. (2007). "Whales originated from aquatic artiodactyls in the Eocene epoch of India" (PDF). Nature. 450 (7173): 1190–1194. Bibcode:2007Natur.450.1190T. doi:10.1038/nature06343. PMID 18097400. S2CID 4416444. Archived from the original (PDF) on 7 May 2021.
- van der Hoop, Julie; Corkeron, Peter; Moore, Michael (2017). "Entanglement is a costly life-history stage in large whales". Ecology and Evolution. 7 (1): 92–106. Bibcode:2017EcoEv...7...92V. doi:10.1002/ece3.2615. ISSN 2045-7758. PMC 5213775. PMID 28070278.
- Watson, K. K.; Jones, T. K.; Allman, J. M. (2006). "Dendritic architecture of the Von Economo neurons". Neuroscience. 141 (3): 1107–1112. doi:10.1016/j.neuroscience.2006.04.084. PMID 16797136. S2CID 7745280.
- Wiley, David; et al. (2011). "Underwater components of humpback whale bubble-net feeding behaviour". Behaviour. 148 (5): 575–602. doi:10.1163/000579511X570893.
- Zerbini, Alexandre N.; et al. (11 May 2006). "Satellite-monitored movements of humpback whales Megaptera novaeanglia in the Southwest Atlantic Ocean". Marine Ecology Progress Series. 313: 295–304. Bibcode:2006MEPS..313..295Z. doi:10.3354/meps313295.

=== Websites ===
- Global cetacean summary report (PDF) (Report). Australian Government Department for the Environment, Water, Heritage and the Arts. June 2009.
- Boness, Laura (26 May 2014). "Whale poo important for ocean ecosystems". Australian Geographic.
- Ford, Catherine (July 2015). "John Newton's 'A Savage History: Whaling in the South Pacific and Southern Oceans'". The Monthly.
- Griffin, Catherine (7 December 2015). "Beluga Bubbles Reveal How These Whales Are Feeling". Science World Report.
- Higgs, Eleanor (14 August 2023). "Watch A Humpback Whale "Tail Sailing" In Incredible Video". Lifescience.com.
- Hovhannes, Alan (1970). "And God Created Great Whales (1970) for Orchestra and Whale Songs". Archived from the original on 24 May 2005.
- IWC. "Small cetaceans". International Whaling Commission. Archived from the original on 21 March 2017.
- IWC. "The Great Whales". International Whaling Commission. Archived from the original on 21 March 2017.
- IWC. "Aboriginal Subsistence Whaling". International Whaling Commission.
- IWC. "Key Documents". International Whaling Commission.
- IWC. "Catch Limits". International Whaling Commission. Archived from the original on 8 December 2016.
- IWC. "Whale Sanctuaries". International Whaling Commission.
- Lam, Andy (Fall 1999). "The Convergent Evolution of Marine Fish and Whales". The University of Arizona. Archived from the original on 7 February 2017.
- MacKenzie, Debora (4 June 1994). "Whales win southern sanctuary". New Scientist.
- Marrero, Meghan E.; Thornton, Stuart (1 November 2011). "Big Fish: A Brief History of Whaling". National Geographic. Archived from the original on 11 October 2015.
- Metcalfe, C. (23 February 2012). "Persistent organic pollutants in the marine food chain". United Nations University. Archived from the original on 22 October 2019.
- Mind Matters (15 January 2008). "Are whales smarter than we are?". Scientific American.
- Moskowitz, Clara (2 June 2011). "Jaw-Dropping Similarity Found in Whales and Pelicans". Live Science. Archived from the original on 3 July 2012.
- O'Connor, S.; Campbell, R.; Cortez, H.; Knowles, T. (2009). Whale Watching Worldwide: tourism numbers, expenditures and expanding economic benefits (PDF) (Report). International Fund for Animal Welfare. Archived from the original (PDF) on 8 May 2015.
- Siebert, Charles (8 July 2009). "Watching Whales Watching Us". The New York Times Magazine.
- Stockton, Nick (19 July 2016). "The Sea Will Get a Lot Quieter Without the Navy's Whale-Killing Sonar". Wired. Archived from the original on 28 August 2016.
- Stonehouse, Bernard (5 October 2007). "British Arctic whaling: an overview". University of Hull. Archived from the original on 5 October 2016.
- Viegas, Jennifer (23 February 2010). "Thousands Mourn Dead Whale in Vietnam". Seeker.
- "Introduction to Cetacea: Archaeocetes: The Oldest Whales". University of Berkeley.
- "Mysticetes hunt in groups". Defenders of Wildlife. 10 April 2012.
- "Whale products". New Bedford Whaling Museum.
- "Which countries are still whaling". International Fund for Animal Welfare.
- "The physics of bubble rings and other diver's exhausts". Deep Ocean's Diving Science. Archived from the original on 6 October 2006.
- "Marine Wildlife Viewing Guidelines" (PDF). Watchable Wildlife Marine Viewing Working Group. January 2004. Archived from the original (PDF) on 4 October 2006.
- "Sperm Whales (Physeter macrocephalus)". NOAA Fisheries – Office of Protected Resources. 13 November 2013. Archived from the original on 10 July 2014.
- "The Tuna-Dolphin Issue". NOAA Fisheries – Southwest Fisheries Science Center. 24 December 2014. Archived from the original on 25 September 2015.
- "North Atlantic Right Whale (Eubalaena glacialis) Source Document for the Critical Habitat Designation: A review of information pertaining to the definition of "critical habitat"" (PDF). National Marine Fisheries Service. July 2014. Archived from the original (PDF) on 24 September 2015.
- Beluga Whales in Captivity: Hunted, Poisoned, Unprotected. Special Report on Captivity 2006 (Report). Canadian Marine Environment Protection Society. 2006.
- "Beluga (Delphinapterus leucas) Facts – Distribution – In the Zoo". World Association of Zoos and Aquariums. Archived from the original on 10 February 2012.
- "Going Aquatic: Cetacean Evolution". Nature. PBS. 21 March 2012.
- "Timeline: The History of Whaling in America". American Experience. PBS. Archived from the original on 1 May 2010.
- "The Story of Navy Dolphins". Frontline. PBS.
- "Does Military Sonar Kill Marine Wildlife?". Scientific American. 10 June 2009. Archived from the original on 26 November 2017.
- "CWA travels to The Petroglyphs of Bangudae". World Archaeology. 24 January 2014.
- "Watching out for whales: Reducing risks when ships and whales share the seas". wwf.panda.org. WWF.
- Ban Tha Chalom (25 November 2024). "ชวนดูวาฬบรูด้า ยักษ์ใหญ่ใจดีแห่งท้องทะเลไทย" [Come see Bryde's whales, the gentle giants of the Thai seas]. Facebook (in Thai).

=== News ===
- Barlass, Tim (30 March 2014). "Bizarre whale treatment for rheumatism revealed". The Sydney Morning Herald.
- Carrington, Damian (3 July 2013). "Whales flee from military sonar leading to mass strandings, research shows". The Guardian. Archived from the original on 1 October 2017.
- Collins, Nick (22 October 2012). "Whale learns to mimic human speech". The Telegraph. Archived from the original on 11 January 2022.
- "Commercial Whaling: Good Whale Hunting". The Economist. 4 March 2012.
- Gray, Richard (13 June 2013). "How the sperm whale can hold its breath for 90 minutes". The Daily Telegraph. ISSN 0307-1235. Archived from the original on 11 January 2022.
- Kirby, Alex (8 October 2003). "Sonar may cause Whale deaths".
- Northeastern Ohio Universities Colleges of Medicine and Pharmacy (21 December 2007). "Whales Descended From Tiny Deer-like Ancestors". Science Daily.
- The Pall Mall Gazette (7 March 1896). "A New Cure for Rheumatism" (PDF).
- Tsai, Wen-Chu (3 July 2015). "Whales and trash-bags". Taipei Times.
- University of Vermont (12 October 2010). "Whale poop pumps up ocean health". Science Daily.
- "Rock art hints at whaling origins". BBC News. 20 April 2004. "Stone Age people may have started hunting whales as early as 6,000 BC, new evidence from South Korea suggests."
- "Thousand gather for whale's funeral in Vietnam". The Independent. Associated Press. 23 February 2010.
- "Whale funeral draws 1000 mourners in Vietnam". The Sydney Morning Herald. AFP. 14 April 2003.
- "Live Whales from the St. Lawrence". The New York Times. 9 August 1861.
- "Funeral for a Whale held at Apam". GhanaWeb. Ghana News Agency. 10 August 2005.

=== Other ===
- "Lamentations 4:3". Bible.
- "Matthew". Bible.
- "Milk". Modern Marvels. Season 14. 7 January 2008. The History Channel.
