= Darlene R. Ketten =

American scientist

Darlene R. Ketten is an American Senior Scientist at the Woods Hole Oceanographic Institution. She is best known for her work on marine mammal science, the biomechanics of hearing, and hearing loss.

== Biography ==
Ketten received her B.A. from Washington University in St. Louis in 1971. In 1979, she completed her M.S. at Massachusetts Institute of Technology, and in 1985 she earned her Ph.D. from Johns Hopkins University. Ketten has been affiliated with Harvard Medical School since 1985. Since 1997, she has been affiliated with the Woods Hole Oceanographic Institution. From 2013-2015, she was a Professor of Physics at Curtin University, Australia. In 2015, she was a Fellow at the Hanse-Wissenschaftskolleg in Germany and from 2015-2016 served as a Jefferson Science Fellow in the Bureau of Near Eastern Affairs of the United States Department of State and at the US Embassy in Berlin. Ketten is a Fellow of the American Association for the Advancement of Science and of the Acoustical Society of America.

Ketten's research on hearing has raised questions about the impacts of human uses of sonar on the hearing and navigation of whales and other marine mammals. Ketten has continued to use the evolution of technology to her advantage, by using computer models, for her specialty of marine mammal ears to visualize the structure of the inner ear and its association with sound. Ketten’s research, with continued use of modern technology, focuses on bottlenose dolphins in the Atlantic and the relationship between their rotational behavior in relation to echolocation performance.
