= Longline fishing =

Commercial fishing technique

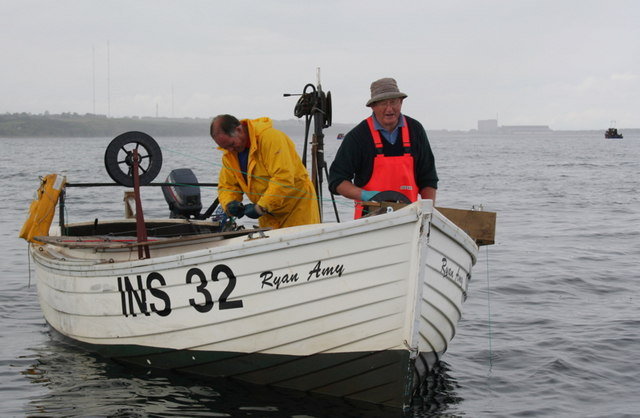
Longlining for mackerel

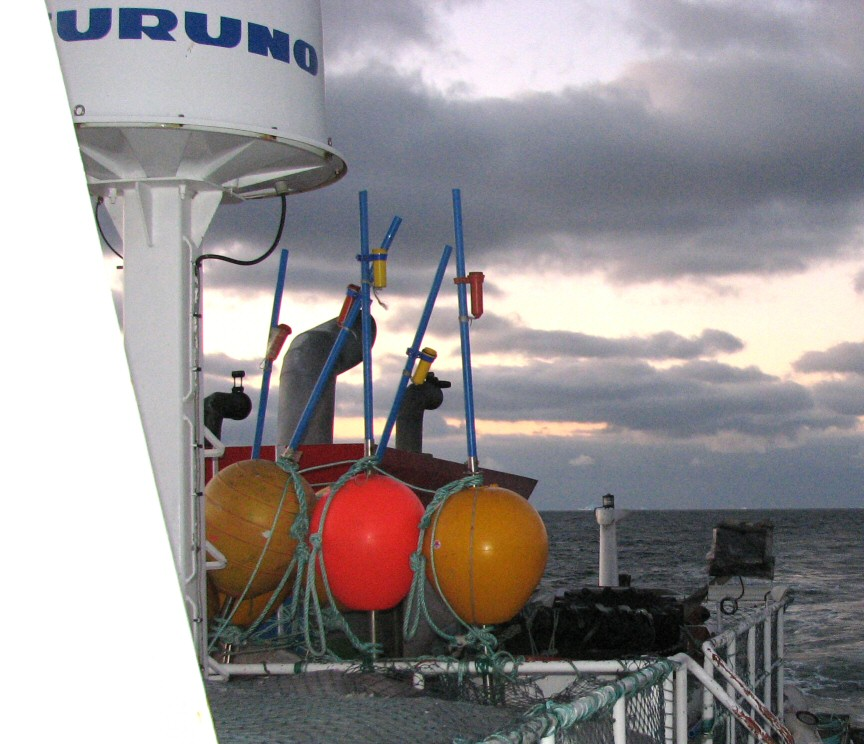
Longline radiobuoys

Longline fishing, or longlining, is a commercial fishing angling technique that uses a long main line with baited hooks attached at intervals via short branch lines called snoods or gangions. A snood is attached to the main line using a clip or swivel, with the hook at the other end. Longlines are classified mainly by where they are placed in the water column. This can be at the surface or at the bottom. Lines can also be set by means of an anchor, or left to drift. Hundreds or even thousands of baited hooks can hang from a single line. This can lead to the death of many different marine species known as bycatch. Longliners – fishing vessels rigged for longlining – commonly target swordfish, tuna, halibut, sablefish and many other species.

In some unstable fisheries, such as the Patagonian toothfish, fishermen may be limited to as few as 25 hooks per line. In contrast, commercial longliners in certain robust fisheries of the Bering Sea and North Pacific generally run over 2,500 hand-baited hooks on a single series of connected lines many miles in length.

Longlines can be set to hang near the surface (pelagic longline) to catch fish such as tuna and swordfish or along the sea floor (demersal longline) for groundfish such as halibut or cod. Longliners fishing for sablefish, also referred to as black cod, occasionally set gear on the sea floor at depths exceeding 1,100 metres (3,600 ft) using relatively simple equipment. Longlines with traps attached rather than hooks can be used for crab fishing in deep waters.

Longline fishing is prone to the incidental catching and killing of dolphins, seabirds, sea turtles, and sharks, but less so than deep sea trawling.

In Hawaii, where Japanese immigrants introduced longlining in 1917, longline fishing was known as flagline fishing because of the use of flags to mark floats from which hooks were suspended. The term "flagline fishing" persisted until local fishing vessels began to use modern monofilament mainline, line setters, and large, hydraulically powered reels, when the term "longline fishing" was adopted.

== Incidental catch ==
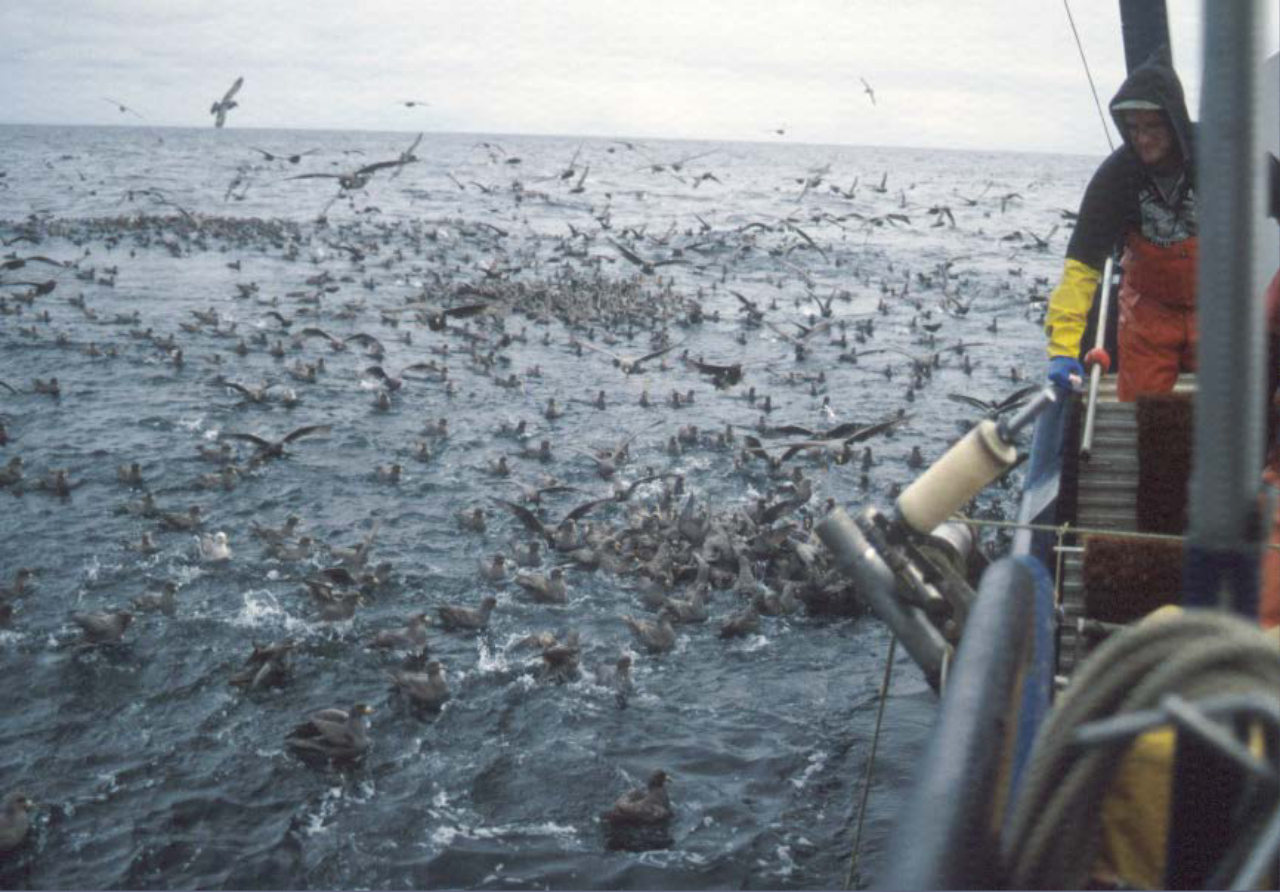
Seabirds with longline fishing vessel

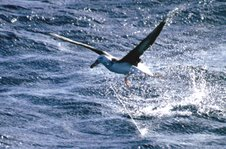
Black-browed albatross hooked on a long-line

Longline fishing is controversial because of bycatch, fish caught while seeking another species or immature juveniles of the target species. This can cause many issues, such as the killing of many other marine animals while seeking certain commercial fish. Seabirds can be particularly vulnerable during the setting of the line.

Methods to mitigate incidental mortality have succeeded in some fisheries. Mitigation techniques include the use of weights to ensure the lines sink quickly, the deployment of streamer lines to scare away birds, lasers, setting lines only at night in low light (to avoid attracting birds), limiting fishing seasons to the southern winter (when most seabirds are not feeding young), and not discharging offal while setting lines.

The Hawaii-based longline fishery for swordfish was closed in 2000 over concerns of excessive sea turtle by-catch, particularly loggerhead sea turtles and leatherback turtles. Changes to the management rules allowed the fishery to reopen in 2004. Gear modification, particularly a change to large circle-hooks and mackerel-type baits, eliminated much of the sea turtle by-catch associated with the fishing technique. It has been claimed that one consequence of the closure was that 70 Hawaii-based vessels were replaced by 1,500–1,700 longline vessels from various Asian nations, but this is not based on any reliable data. Due to poor and often non-existent catch documentation by these vessels, the number of sea turtles and albatross caught by these vessels between 2000 and 2004 will never be known. Hawaii longline fishing for swordfish closed again on 17 March 2006, when the by-catch limit of 17 loggerhead turtles was reached. In 2010 the by-catch limit for loggerhead turtles was raised, but was restored to the former limit as a result of litigation. The Hawaii-based longline fisheries for tuna and swordfish are managed under sets of slightly different rules. The tuna fishery is one of the best managed fisheries in the world, according to the UN Code of Responsible Fishing, but has been criticized by others, as being responsible for continuing by-catch of false killer whales, seabirds, and other nontargeted wildlife, as well as placing pressure on depleted bigeye tuna stocks.

Commercial longline fishing is also one of the main threats to albatrosses, posing a particularly serious threat to their survival. Of the 22 albatross species recognized by the IUCN Red List, 15 are threatened with extinction. The IUCN lists two species as Critically Endangered (Tristan albatross and waved albatross), seven species as Endangered, and six as Vulnerable. Albatrosses and other seabirds which readily feed on offal are attracted to the set bait, become hooked on the lines and drown. An estimated 8,000 albatross per year are killed in this way. These activities, however, are not randomly spread across the vast oceans, but rather are highly spatially concentrated.

== Plastic pollution ==
According to Greenpeace, oceanic macroplastic (pieces exceeding 20 cm (7.9 in) in size) pollution is largely made up of modern plastic fishing equipment such as drift nets and longline fishing equipment. Additionally approximately 10% of the total weight of all oceanic plastic is produced by fishing industry equipment. They believe the majority of this pollution originates from undocumented and illegal fishing activity rather than from regulated fisheries.

It has also been found that fishing nets and lines, such as longlines, shed microplastics while being towed. While new lines were found to shed only 20 microplastic fragments per yard towed, 10-year-old lines shed 760 per yard. Based on the number of fishing vessels believed to operate in the oceans researchers from the University of Plymouth gave an estimate of between 326 million to 17 billion microplastic fragments shed in the oceans each year from fishing boats.

== Safety ==
In the US, a study found that the risk for non-fatal injuries was 35 per 1,000 full-time equivalent employees, about three times higher than average U.S. worker. (This is compared to 43 per 1,000 in the trawler fleet).

== Historic images ==
Commercial longlining

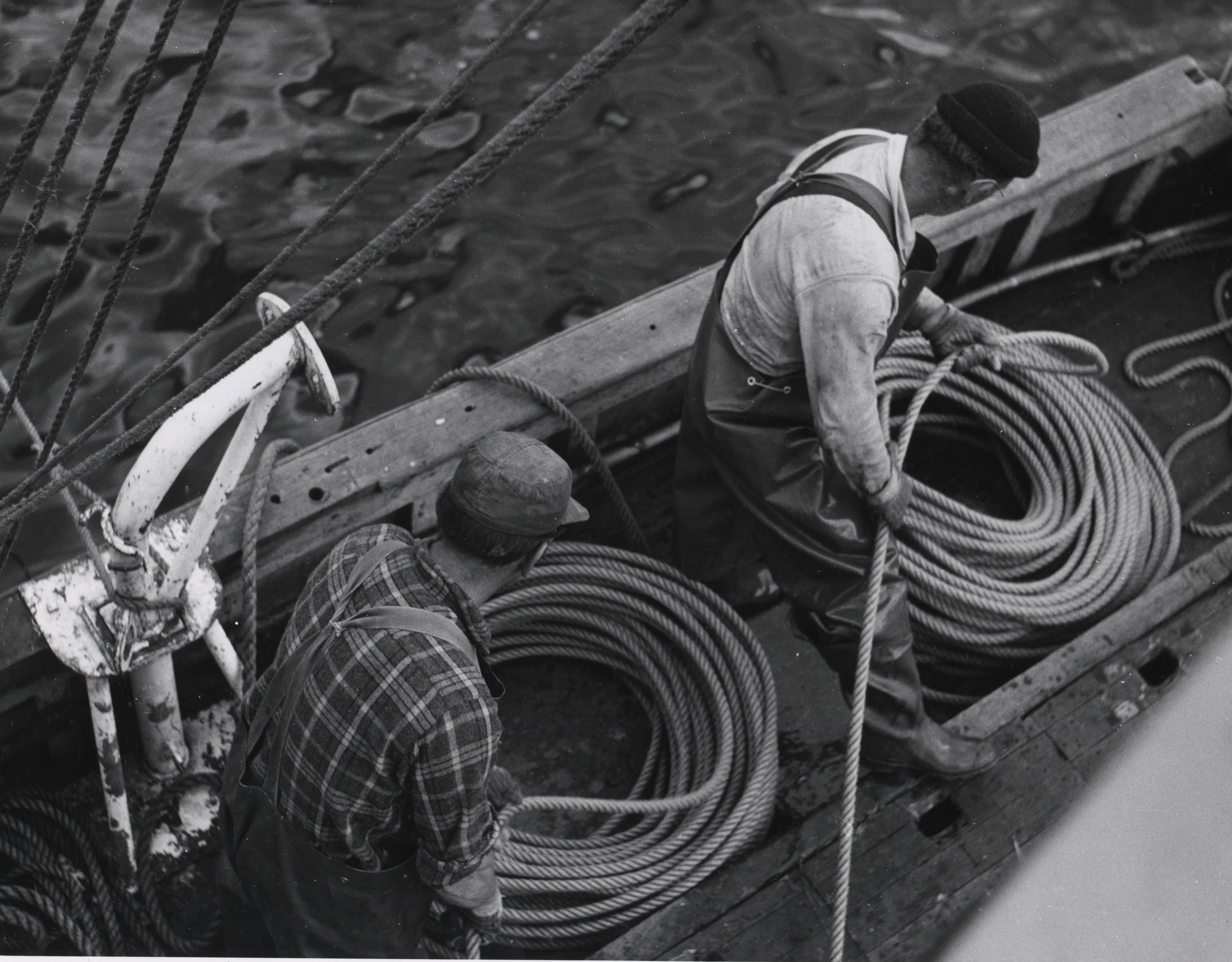
Preparing lines for longlining

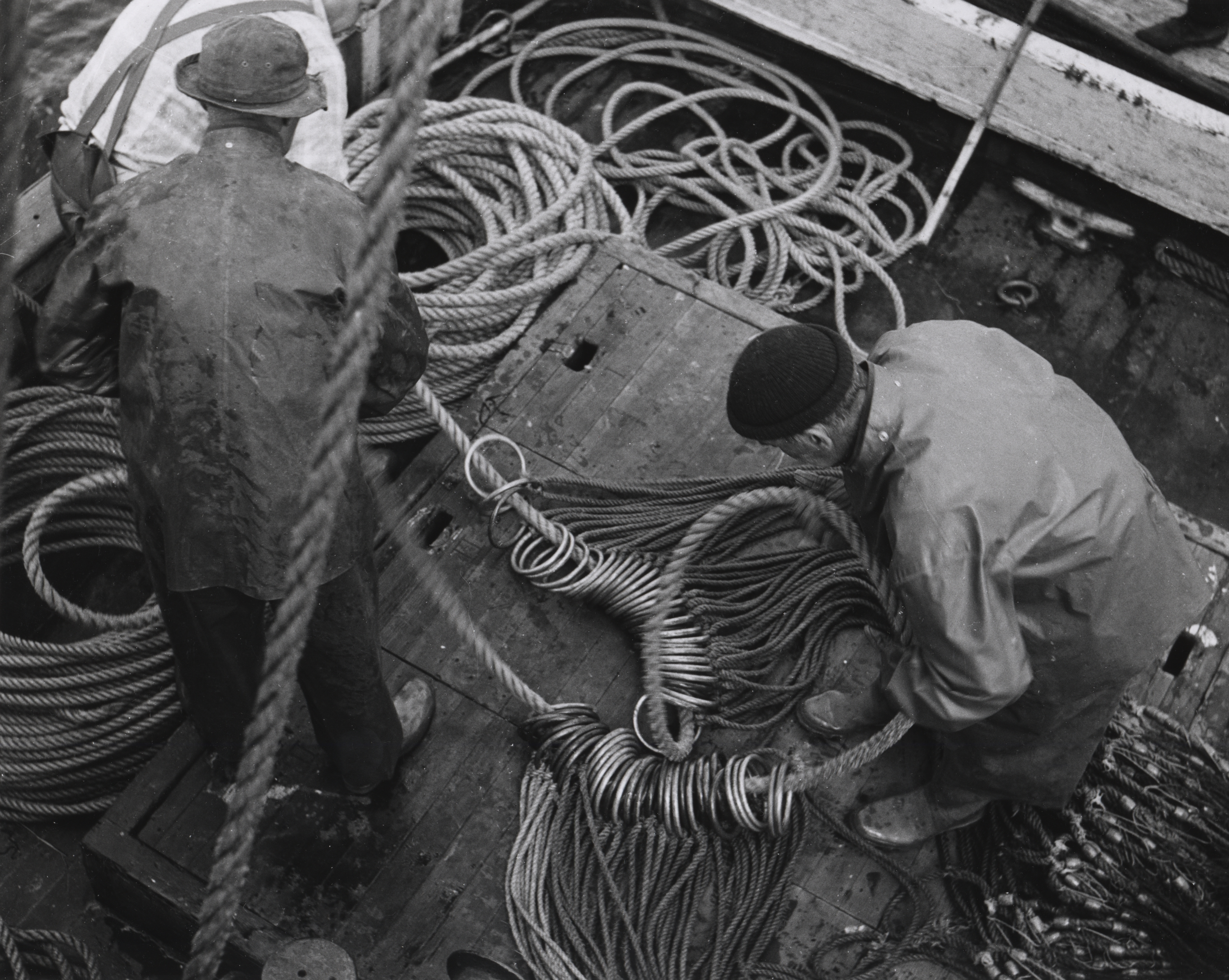
Snoods (gangions) used in the longlining

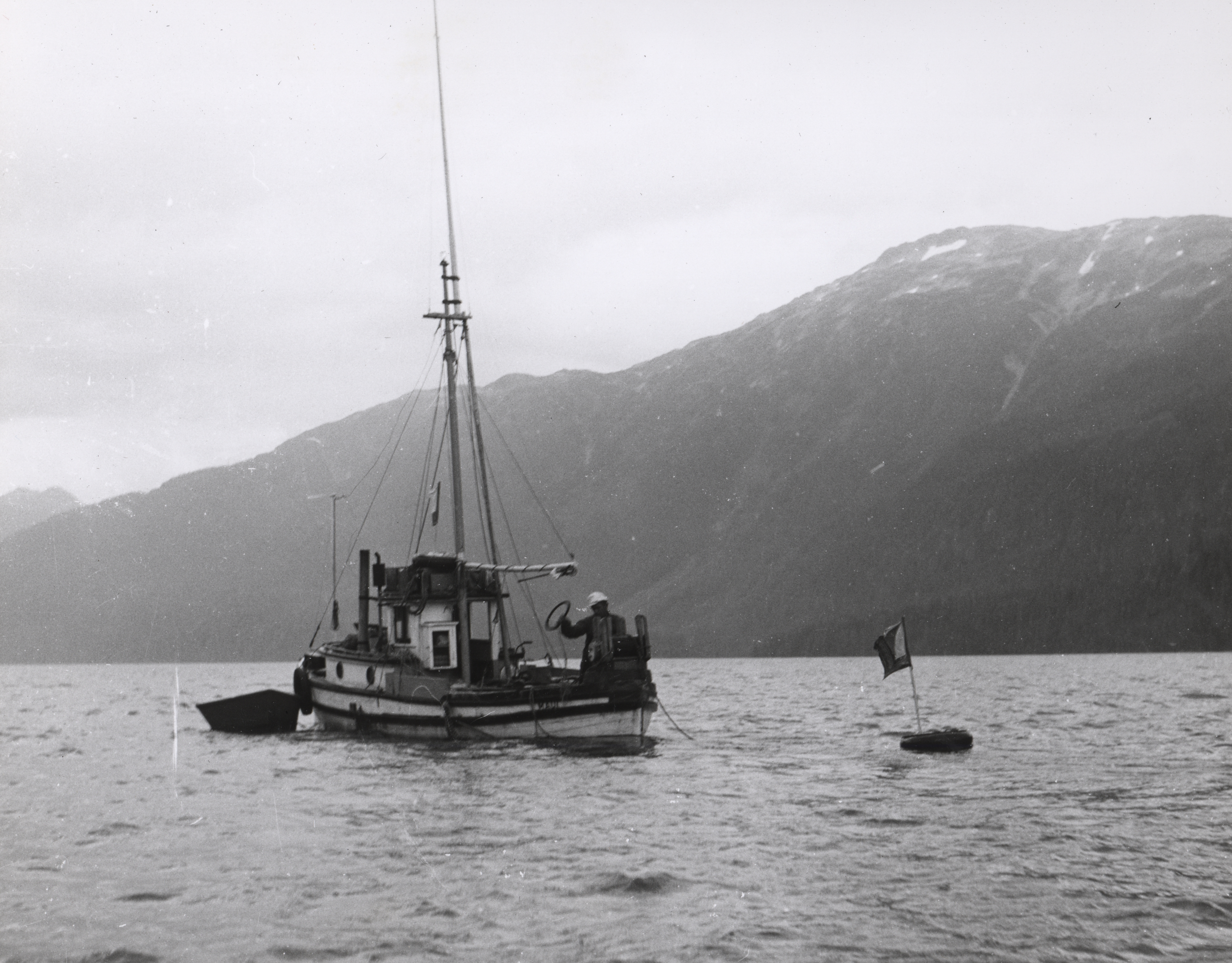
Setting a buoy to mark the end of a longline

== See also ==
- Trotline
