= Seabird =

Birds living in the maritime environment

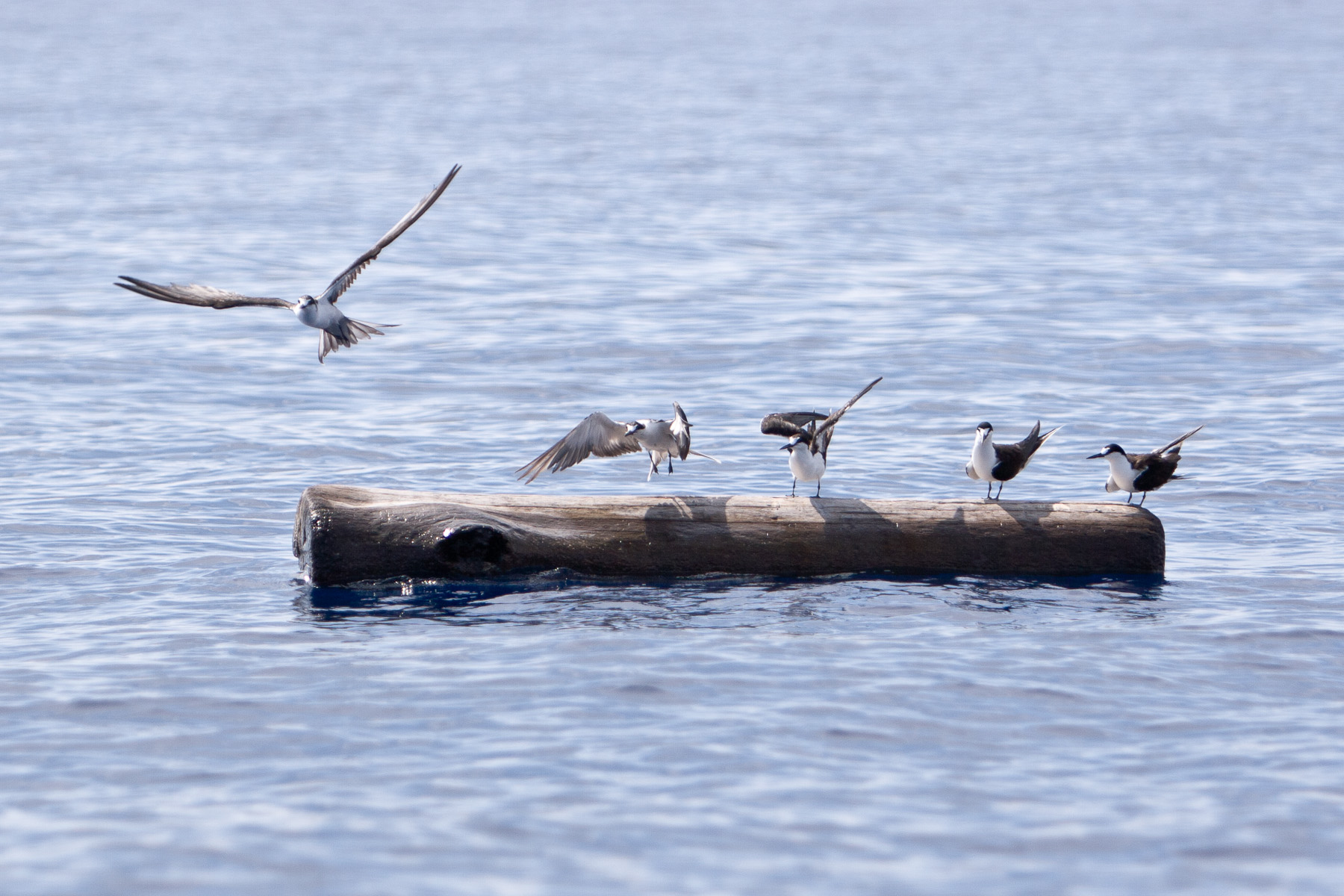
The sooty tern is highly aerial and marine and spends months flying at sea, returning to land only for breeding.

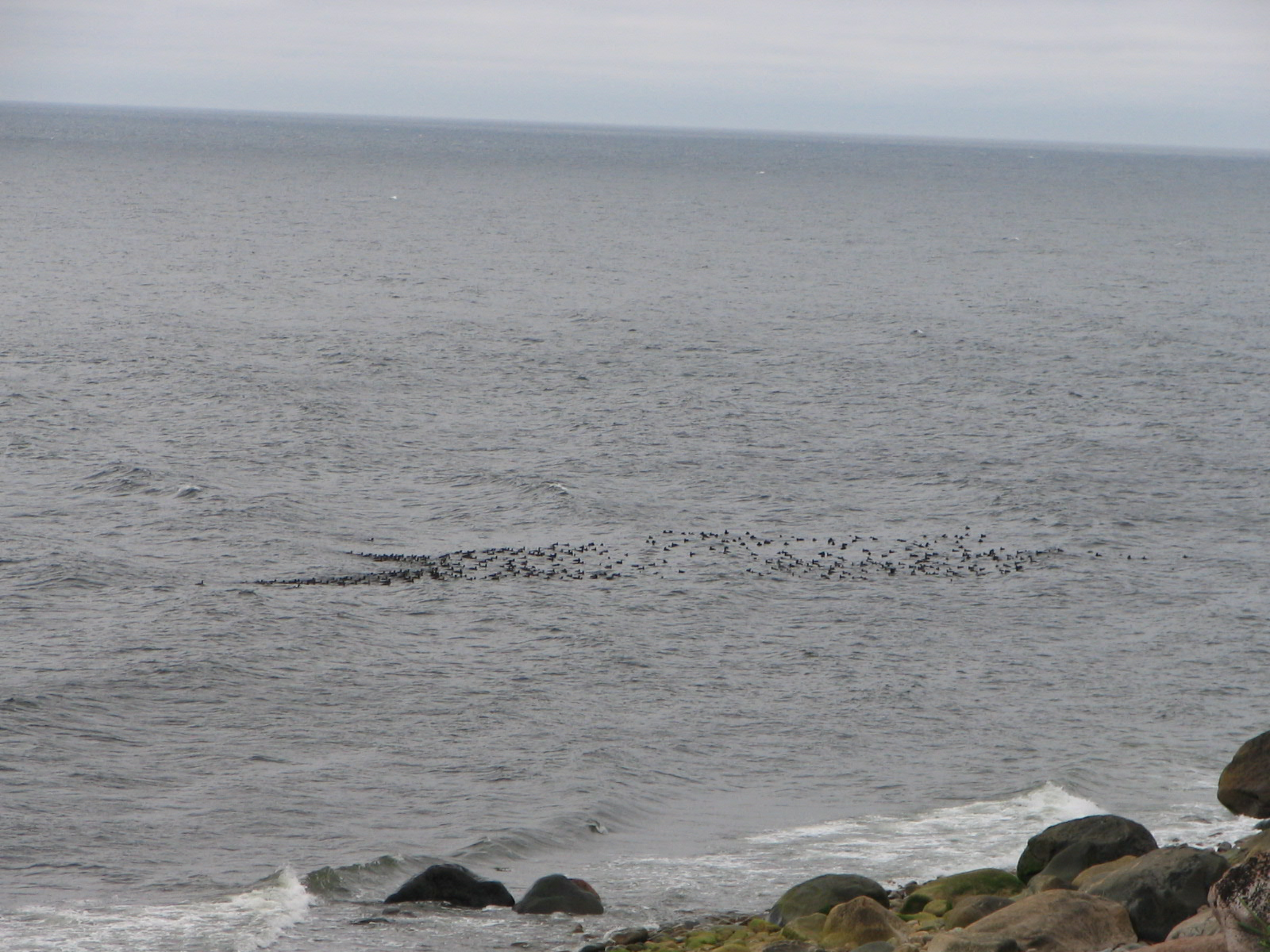
Raft of coastal seabirds Gulf of St. Lawrence, Quebec, Canada

Seabirds (also known as marine birds) are birds that are adapted to life within the marine environment. While seabirds vary greatly in lifestyle, behaviour and physiology, they often exhibit striking convergent evolution, as the same environmental problems and feeding niches have resulted in similar adaptations. The first seabirds evolved in the Cretaceous period, while modern seabird families emerged in the Paleogene.

Seabirds generally live longer, breed later and have fewer young than many other birds, but they invest a great deal of time in their young. Most species nest in colonies, varying in size from a few dozen birds to millions. Many species are famous for undertaking long annual migrations, crossing the equator or circumnavigating the Earth in some cases. They feed both at the ocean's surface and below it, and even on each other. Seabirds can be highly pelagic, coastal, or in some cases spend a part of the year away from the sea entirely.

Seabirds and humans have a long history together: They have provided food to hunters, guided fishers to fishing stocks, and led sailors to land. Many species are currently threatened by human activities such as oil spills, fishing activity, offshore development, climate change and severe weather. Conservation efforts include the establishment of wildlife refuges and adjustments to fishing techniques.

== Classification ==
There exists no single definition of which groups, families and species are seabirds, and most definitions are in some way arbitrary. Elizabeth Shreiber and Joanna Burger, two seabird scientists, said, "The one common characteristic that all seabirds share is that they feed in saltwater; but, as seems to be true with any statement in biology, some do not." However, by convention, all of the Sphenisciformes (penguins), all of the Phaethontiformes (tropicbirds), all of the Procellariiformes (albatrosses and petrels), all of the Suliformes (gannets, boobies, frigatebirds, and cormorants) except the darters, one family of the Pelecaniformes (pelicans), and some of the Charadriiformes (gulls, skuas, terns, auks, and skimmers) are classified as seabirds. The phalaropes are usually included as well, since although they are waders ("shorebirds" in North America), two of the three species (red and red-necked) are oceanic for nine months of the year, crossing the equator to feed pelagically.

Loons and grebes, which nest on lakes but winter at sea, are usually categorized as water birds, not seabirds. Although there are a number of sea ducks in the family Anatidae that are truly marine in the winter, by convention they are usually excluded from the seabird grouping. Many herons and waders (or shorebirds), such as crab-plovers, are also highly marine, living on the sea's edge (coast), but are also not treated as seabirds. Fish-eating birds of prey, such as sea eagles and ospreys, are also typically excluded, however tied to marine environments they may be. Some birds, such as darters, are primarily found in freshwater habitats, but may occasionally venture into marine or coastal areas as well; such birds are generally not considered to be seabirds.

German ornithologist Gerald Mayr defined the "core waterbird" clade Aequornithes in 2010. This lineage gives rise to the Procellariiformes, Sphenisciformes, Suliformes, Pelecaniformes, Ciconiiformes (not seabirds), and Gaviiformes (not seabirds). The tropicbirds (Phaethontiformes) are part of the Eurypygimorphae lineage, which is sister to the Aequornithes; this clade also includes the non-seabird Eurypygiformes (kagu and sunbittern). The Charadriiformes are more distantly related to the other seabirds, being more closely related to the non-seabird Gruiformes (rails and cranes) and Opisthocomiformes (hoatzin) in the clade Gruae.

== Evolution and fossil record ==
Seabirds, by virtue of living in a geologically depositional environment (that is, in the sea where sediments are readily laid down), are well-represented in the fossil record. They are first known to occur in the Cretaceous period, the earliest being the Hesperornithes. These were flightless seabirds that could dive in a fashion similar to grebes and loons (using its feet to move underwater), but had beaks filled with sharp teeth. Other Cretaceous seabirds included the gull-like Ichthyornithes. Flying Cretaceous seabirds do not exceed wingspans of two meters; piscivorous pterosaurs occupied seagoing niches above this size.

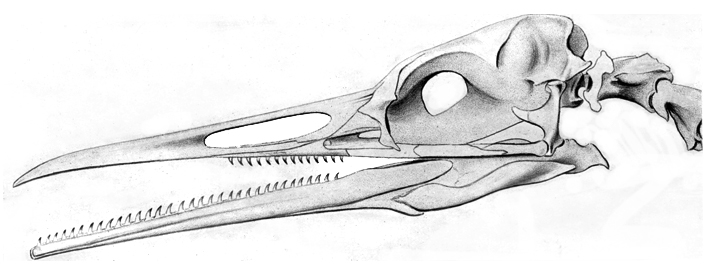
The Cretaceous seabird Hesperornis

While Hesperornis is not thought to have left descendants, the earliest modern seabirds also occurred in the Cretaceous, with a species called Tytthostonyx glauconiticus, which has features suggestive of Procellariiformes and Fregatidae. As a clade, the Aequornithes either became seabirds in a single transition in the Cretaceous or some lineages such as pelicans and frigatebirds adapted to sea living independently from freshwater-dwelling ancestors. In the Paleogene both pterosaurs and marine reptiles became extinct, allowing seabirds to expand ecologically. These post-extinction seas were dominated by early Procellariidae, giant penguins and two extinct families, the Pelagornithidae and the Plotopteridae (a group of large seabirds that looked like the penguins). Modern genera began their wide radiation in the Miocene, although the genus Puffinus (which includes today's Manx shearwater and sooty shearwater) might date back to the Oligocene. Within the Charadriiformes, the gulls and allies (Lari) became seabirds in the late Eocene, and then waders in the middle Miocene (Langhian). The highest diversity of seabirds apparently existed during the Late Miocene and the Pliocene. At the end of the latter, the oceanic food web had undergone a period of upheaval due to extinction of considerable numbers of marine species; subsequently, the spread of marine mammals seems to have prevented seabirds from reaching their erstwhile diversity.

== Characteristics ==
=== Adaptations to life at sea ===
Seabirds have made numerous adaptations to living on and feeding in the sea. Wing morphology has been shaped by the niche in which an individual species or family has evolved, so that looking at a wing's shape and loading can tell a scientist about its life feeding behaviour. Longer wings and low wing loading are typical of more pelagic species, while diving species have shorter wings and high wing loading. Species such as the wandering albatross, which forage over huge areas of sea, have a reduced capacity for powered flight and are dependent on a type of gliding called dynamic soaring (where the wind deflected by waves provides lift) as well as slope soaring. Seabirds also almost always have webbed feet, to aid movement on the surface as well as assisting diving in some species. The Procellariiformes are unusual among birds in having a strong sense of smell, which is used to find widely distributed food in a vast ocean, and help distinguish familiar nest odours from unfamiliar ones.

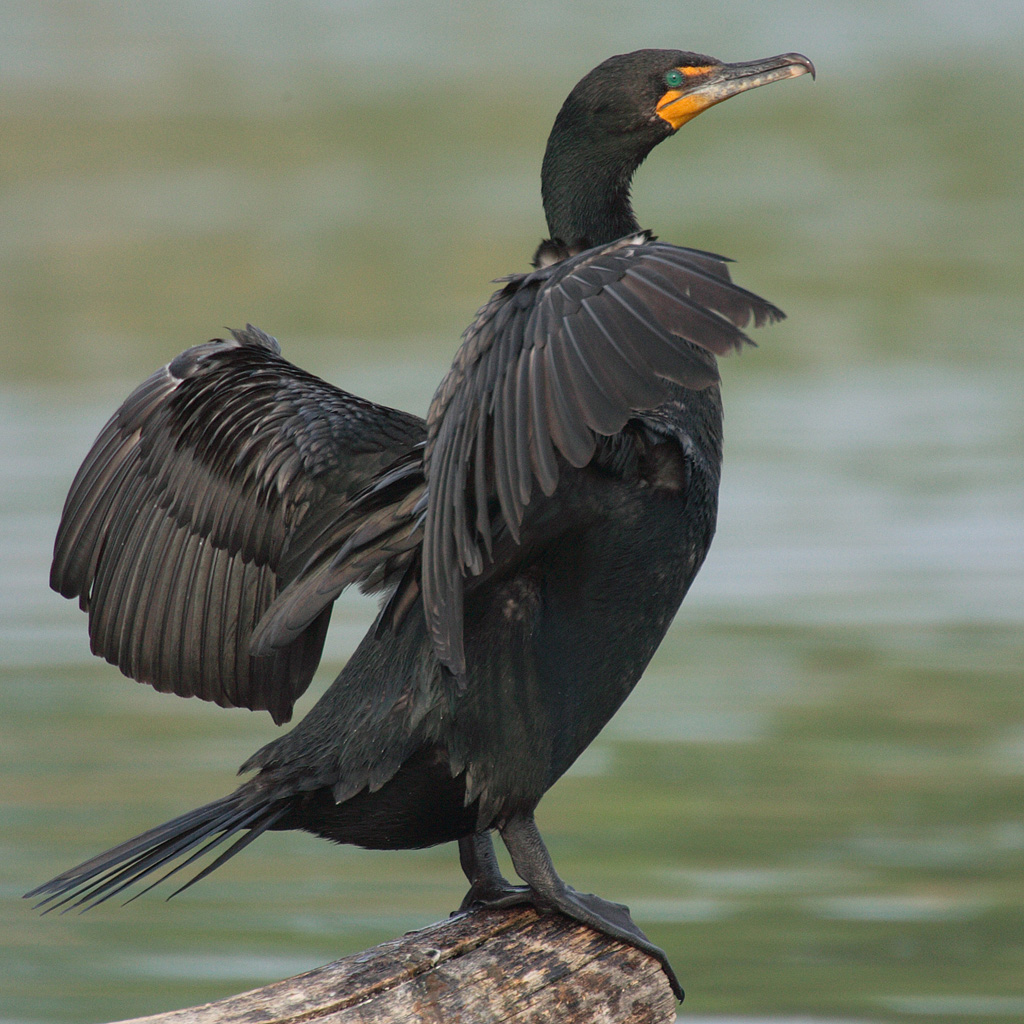
Cormorants, like this double-crested cormorant, have plumage that is partly wettable. This functional adaptation balances the competing requirement for thermoregulation against that of the need to reduce buoyancy.

Salt glands are used by seabirds to deal with the salt they ingest by drinking and feeding (particularly on crustaceans), and to help them osmoregulate. The excretions from these glands (which are positioned in the head of the birds, emerging from the nasal cavity) are almost pure sodium chloride.

With the exception of the cormorants and some terns, and in common with most other birds, all seabirds have waterproof plumage. However, compared to land birds, they have far more feathers protecting their bodies. This dense plumage is better able to protect the bird from getting wet, and cold is kept out by a dense layer of down feathers. The cormorants possess a layer of unique feathers that retain a smaller layer of air (compared to other diving birds) but otherwise soak up water. This allows them to swim without fighting the buoyancy that retaining air in the feathers causes, yet retain enough air to prevent the bird losing excessive heat through contact with water.

The plumage of most seabirds is less colourful than that of land birds, restricted in the main to variations of black, white or grey. A few species sport colourful plumes (such as the tropicbirds and some penguins), but most of the colour in seabirds appears in the bills and legs. The plumage of seabirds is thought in many cases to be for camouflage, both defensive (the colour of US Navy battleships is the same as that of Antarctic prions, and in both cases it reduces visibility at sea) and aggressive (the white underside possessed by many seabirds helps hide them from prey below). The usually black wing tips help prevent wear, as they contain melanins that help the feathers resist abrasion. Seabirds can also display fluorescence, particularly on their bills, likely to indicate their fitness to potential mates.

=== Diet and feeding ===
Seabirds evolved to exploit different food resources in the world's seas and oceans, and to a great extent, their physiology and behaviour have been shaped by their diet. These evolutionary forces have often caused species in different families and even orders to evolve similar strategies and adaptations to the same problems, leading to remarkable convergent evolution, such as that between auks and penguins. There are four basic feeding strategies, or ecological guilds, for feeding at sea: surface feeding, pursuit diving, plunge diving, and predation of higher vertebrates; within these guilds, there are multiple variations on the theme.

==== Surface feeding ====
Many seabirds feed on the ocean's surface, as the action of marine currents often concentrates food such as krill, forage fish, squid, or other prey items within reach of a dipped head.

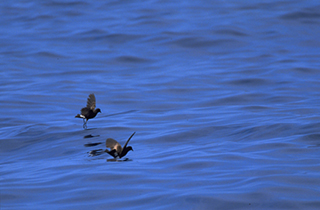
Wilson's storm petrels pattering on the water's surface

Surface feeding itself can be broken up into two different approaches, surface feeding while flying (for example as practiced by gadfly petrels, frigatebirds, and storm petrels), and surface feeding while swimming (examples of which are practiced by gulls, fulmars, many of the shearwaters and gadfly petrels). Surface feeders in flight include some of the most acrobatic of seabirds, which either snatch morsels from the water (as do frigatebirds and some terns), or "walk", pattering and hovering on the water's surface, as some of the storm petrels do. Many of these do not ever land in the water, and some, such as the frigatebirds, have difficulty getting airborne again should they do so. Another seabird family that does not land while feeding is the skimmer, which has a unique fishing method: flying along the surface with the lower mandible in the water—this shuts automatically when the bill touches something in the water. The skimmer's bill reflects its unusual lifestyle, with the lower mandible uniquely being longer than the upper one.

Surface feeders that swim often have unique bills as well, adapted for their specific prey. Prions have special bills with filters called lamellae to filter out plankton from mouthfuls of water, and many albatrosses and petrels have hooked bills to snatch fast-moving prey. On the other hand, most gulls are versatile and opportunistic feeders who will eat a wide variety of prey, both at sea and on land.

==== Pursuit diving ====
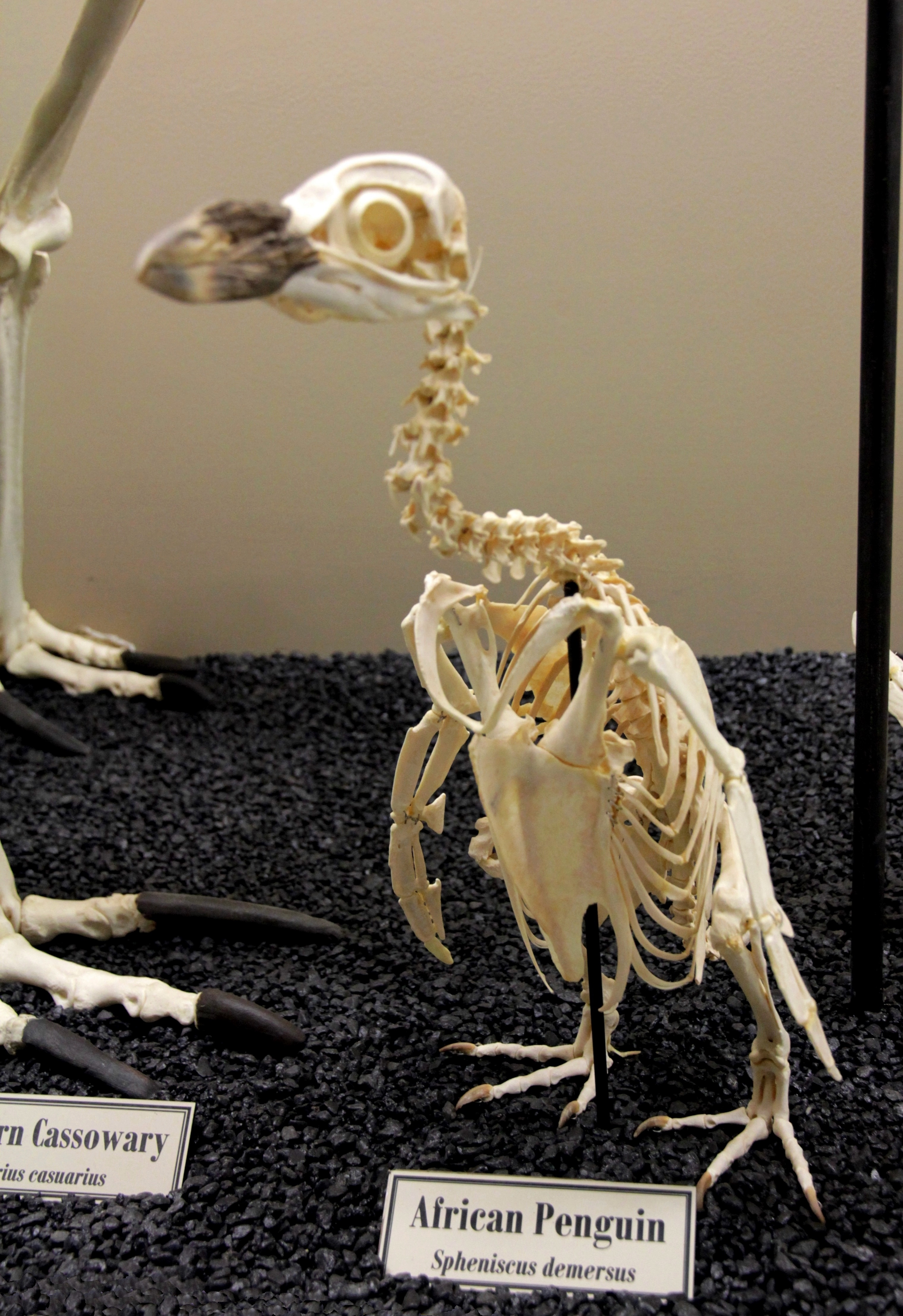
An African penguin skeleton, showing the sternal keel that makes the species a strong diver and swimmer

Pursuit diving exerts greater pressures (both evolutionary and physiological) on seabirds, but the reward is a greater area in which to feed than is available to surface feeders. Underwater propulsion is provided by wings (as used by penguins, auks, diving petrels and some other species of petrel) or feet (as used by cormorants, grebes, loons and several types of fish-eating ducks). Wing-propelled divers are generally faster than foot-propelled divers. The use of wings or feet for diving has limited their utility in other situations: loons and grebes walk with extreme difficulty (if at all), penguins cannot fly, and auks have sacrificed flight efficiency in favour of diving. For example, the razorbill (an Atlantic auk) requires 64% more energy to fly than a petrel of equivalent size. Many shearwaters are intermediate between the two, having longer wings than typical wing-propelled divers but heavier wing loadings than the other surface-feeding procellariids, leaving them capable of diving to considerable depths while still being efficient long-distance travellers. The short-tailed shearwater is the deepest diver of the shearwaters, having been recorded diving below 70 metres (230 ft).

Some albatross species are also capable of limited diving, with light-mantled sooty albatrosses holding the record at 12 metres (40 ft). Of all the wing-propelled pursuit divers, the most efficient in the air are the albatrosses, and they are also the poorest divers. This is the dominant guild in polar and subpolar environments, but it is energetically inefficient in warmer waters. With their poor flying ability, many wing-propelled pursuit divers are more limited in their foraging range than other guilds.

==== Plunge diving ====
Gannets, boobies, tropicbirds, some terns, and brown pelicans all engage in plunge diving, taking fast-moving prey by diving into the water from flight. Plunge diving allows birds to use the energy from the momentum of the dive to combat natural buoyancy (caused by air trapped in plumage), and thus uses less energy than the dedicated pursuit divers, allowing them to utilise more widely distributed food resources, for example, in impoverished tropical seas. In general, this is the most specialised method of hunting employed by seabirds; other non-specialists (such as gulls and skuas) may employ it but do so with less skill and from lower heights. In brown pelicans, the skills of plunge diving take several years to fully develop—once mature, they can dive from 20 m (66 ft) above the water's surface, shifting the body before impact to avoid injury.

It may be that plunge divers are restricted in their hunting grounds to clear waters that afford a view of their prey from the air. While they are the dominant guild in the tropics, the link between plunge diving and water clarity is inconclusive. Some plunge divers (as well as some surface feeders) are dependent on dolphins and tuna to push shoaling fish up towards the surface.

==== Kleptoparasitism, scavenging and predation ====
This catch-all category refers to other seabird strategies that involve the next trophic level up. Kleptoparasites are seabirds that make a part of their living stealing food of other seabirds. Most famously, frigatebirds and skuas engage in this behaviour, although gulls, terns and other species will steal food opportunistically. The nocturnal nesting behaviour of some seabirds has been interpreted as arising due to pressure from this aerial piracy. Kleptoparasitism is not thought to play a significant part of the diet of any species, and is instead a supplement to food obtained by hunting. A study of great frigatebirds stealing from masked boobies estimated that the frigatebirds could at most obtain 40% of the food they needed, and on average obtained only 5%. Many species of gull will feed on seabird and sea mammal carrion when the opportunity arises, as will giant petrels. Some species of albatross also engage in scavenging: an analysis of regurgitated squid beaks has shown that many of the squid eaten are too large to have been caught alive, and include mid-water species likely to be beyond the reach of albatrosses. Some species will also feed on other seabirds; for example, gulls, skuas and pelicans will often take eggs, chicks and even small adult seabirds from nesting colonies, while the giant petrels can kill prey up to the size of small penguins and seal pups.

=== Life history ===
Seabirds' life histories are dramatically different from those of land birds. In general, they are K-selected, live much longer (anywhere between twenty and sixty years), delay breeding for longer (for up to ten years), and invest more effort into fewer young. Most species will only have one clutch a year, unless they lose the first (with a few exceptions, like the Cassin's auklet), and many species (like the tubenoses and sulids) will only lay one egg a year.

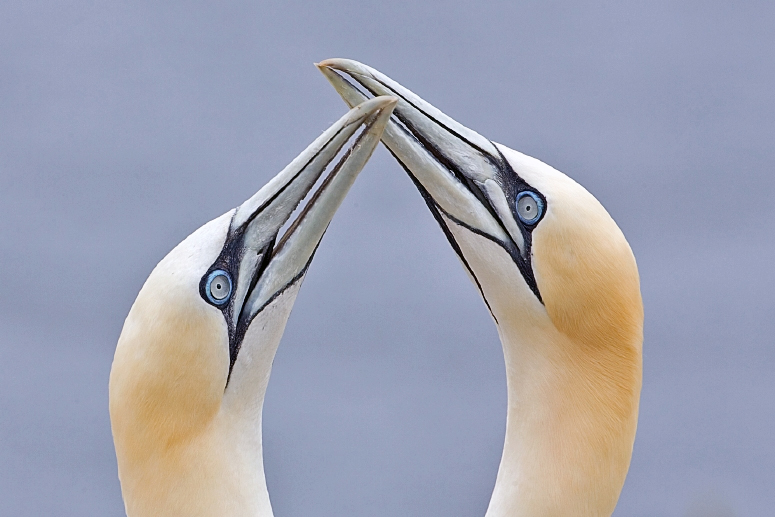
Northern gannet pair "billing" during courtship; like all seabirds except the phalaropes they maintain a pair bond throughout the breeding season.

Care of young is protracted, extending for as long as six months, among the longest for birds. For example, once common guillemot chicks fledge, they remain with the male parent for several months at sea. The frigatebirds have the longest period of parental care of any bird except a few raptors and the southern ground hornbill, with each chick fledging after four to six months and continued assistance after that for up to fourteen months. Due to the extended period of care, breeding occurs every two years rather than annually for some species. This life-history strategy has probably evolved both in response to the challenges of living at sea (collecting widely scattered prey items), the frequency of breeding failures due to unfavourable marine conditions, and the relative lack of predation compared to that of land-living birds.

Because of the greater investment in raising the young and because foraging for food may occur far from the nest site, in all seabird species except the phalaropes, both parents participate in caring for the young, and pairs are typically at least seasonally monogamous. Many species, such as gulls, auks and penguins, retain the same mate for several seasons, and many petrel species mate for life. Albatrosses and procellariids, which mate for life, take many years to form a pair bond before they breed, and the albatrosses have an elaborate breeding dance that is part of pair-bond formation.

=== Breeding and colonies ===
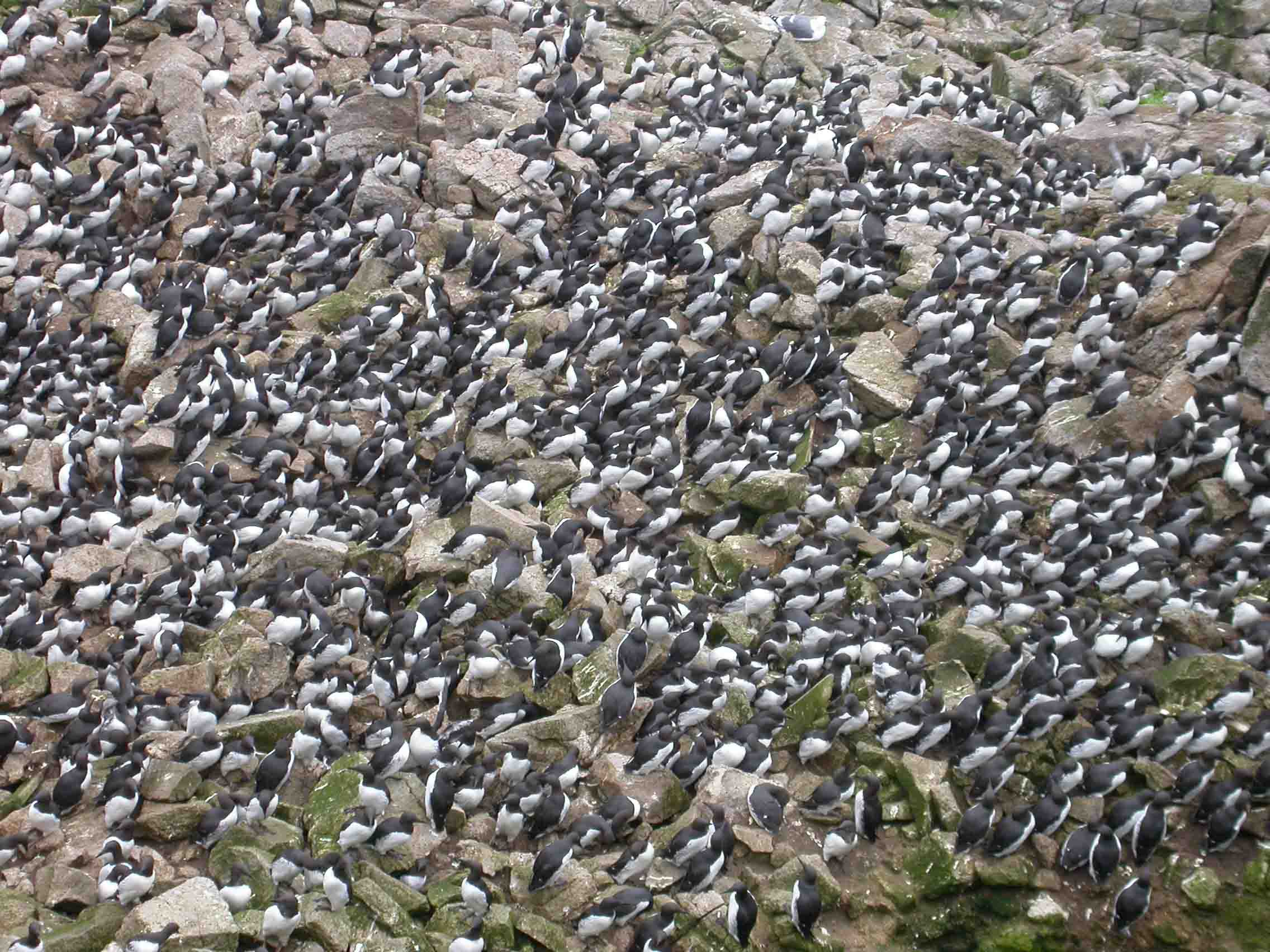
Common murres breed on densely packed colonies on offshore rocks, islands and cliffs.

Ninety-five percent of seabirds are colonial, and seabird colonies are among the largest bird colonies in the world, providing one of Earth's great wildlife spectacles. Colonies of over a million birds have been recorded, both in the tropics (such as Kiritimati in the Pacific) and in the polar latitudes (as in Antarctica). Seabird colonies occur exclusively for the purpose of breeding; non-breeding birds will only collect together outside the breeding season in areas where prey species are densely aggregated.

Seabird colonies are highly variable. Individual nesting sites can be widely spaced, as in an albatross colony, or densely packed as with a murre colony. In most seabird colonies, several different species will nest on the same colony, often exhibiting some niche separation. Seabirds can nest in trees (if any are available), on the ground (with or without nests), on cliffs, in burrows under the ground and in rocky crevices. Competition can be strong both within species and between species, with aggressive species such as sooty terns pushing less dominant species out of the most desirable nesting spaces. The tropical Bonin petrel nests during the winter to avoid competition with the more aggressive wedge-tailed shearwater. When the seasons overlap, the wedge-tailed shearwaters will kill young Bonin petrels in order to use their burrows.

Many seabirds show remarkable site fidelity, returning to the same burrow, nest or site for many years, and they will defend that site from rivals with great vigour. This increases breeding success, provides a place for returning mates to reunite, and reduces the costs of prospecting for a new site. Young adults breeding for the first time usually return to their natal colony, and often nest close to where they hatched. This tendency, known as philopatry, is so strong that a study of Laysan albatrosses found that the average distance between hatching site and the site where a bird established its own territory was 22 metres (72 ft); another study, this time on Cory's shearwaters nesting near Corsica, found that of nine out of 61 male chicks that returned to breed at their natal colony bred in the burrow they were raised in, and two actually bred with their own mother.

Colonies are usually situated on islands, cliffs or headlands, which land mammals have difficulty accessing. This is thought to provide protection to seabirds, which are often very clumsy on land. Coloniality often arises in types of birds that do not defend feeding territories (such as swifts, which have a very variable prey source); this may be a reason why it arises more frequently in seabirds. There are other possible advantages: colonies may act as information centres, where seabirds returning to the sea to forage can find out where prey is by studying returning individuals of the same species. There are disadvantages to colonial life, particularly the spread of disease. Colonies also attract the attention of predators, principally other birds, and many species attend their colonies nocturnally to avoid predation. Birds from different colonies often forage in different areas to avoid competition.

=== Migration ===
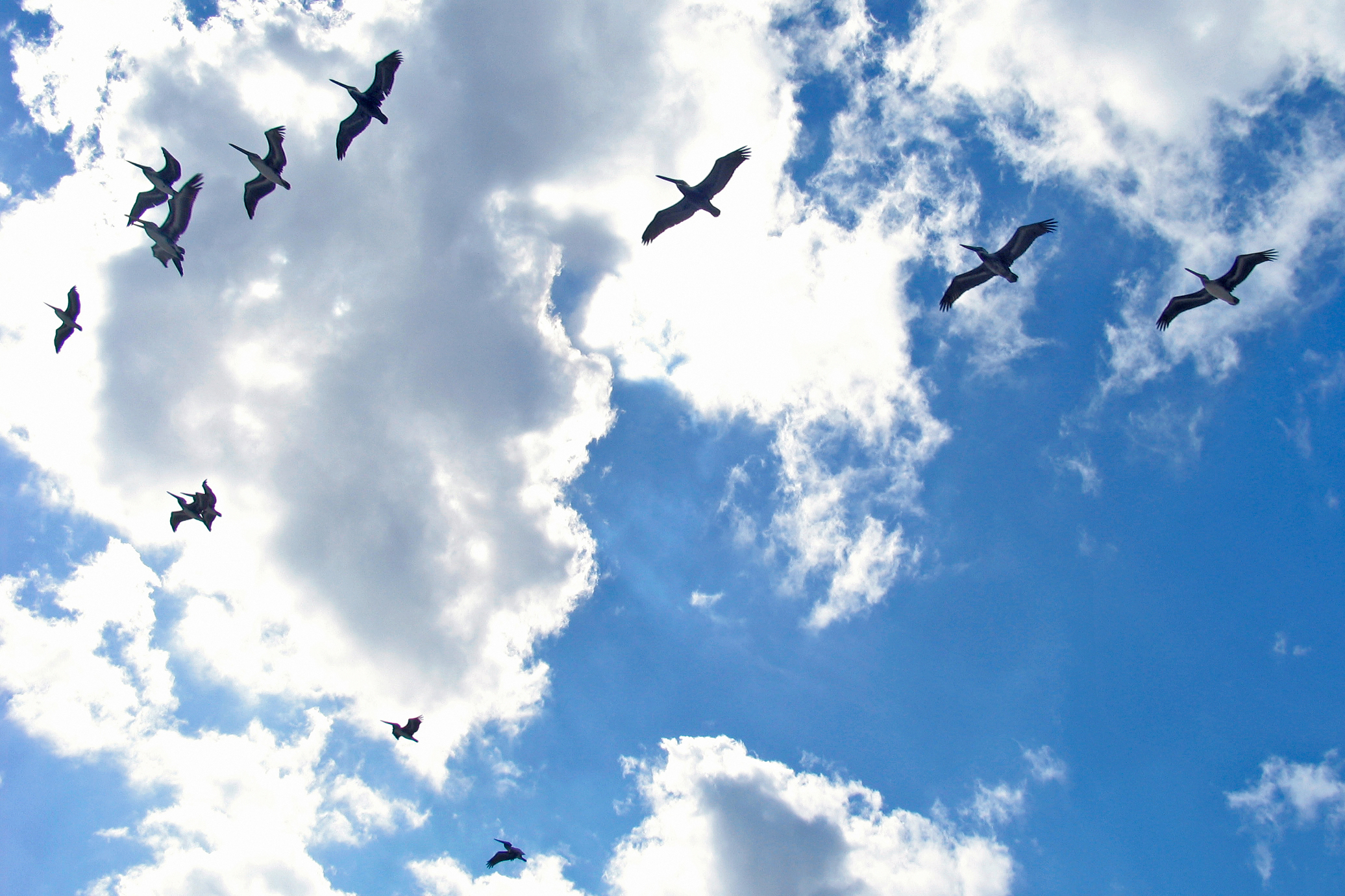
Pelican flock flying over Havana Bay area. These birds come to Cuba every year from North America in the northern hemisphere winter season.

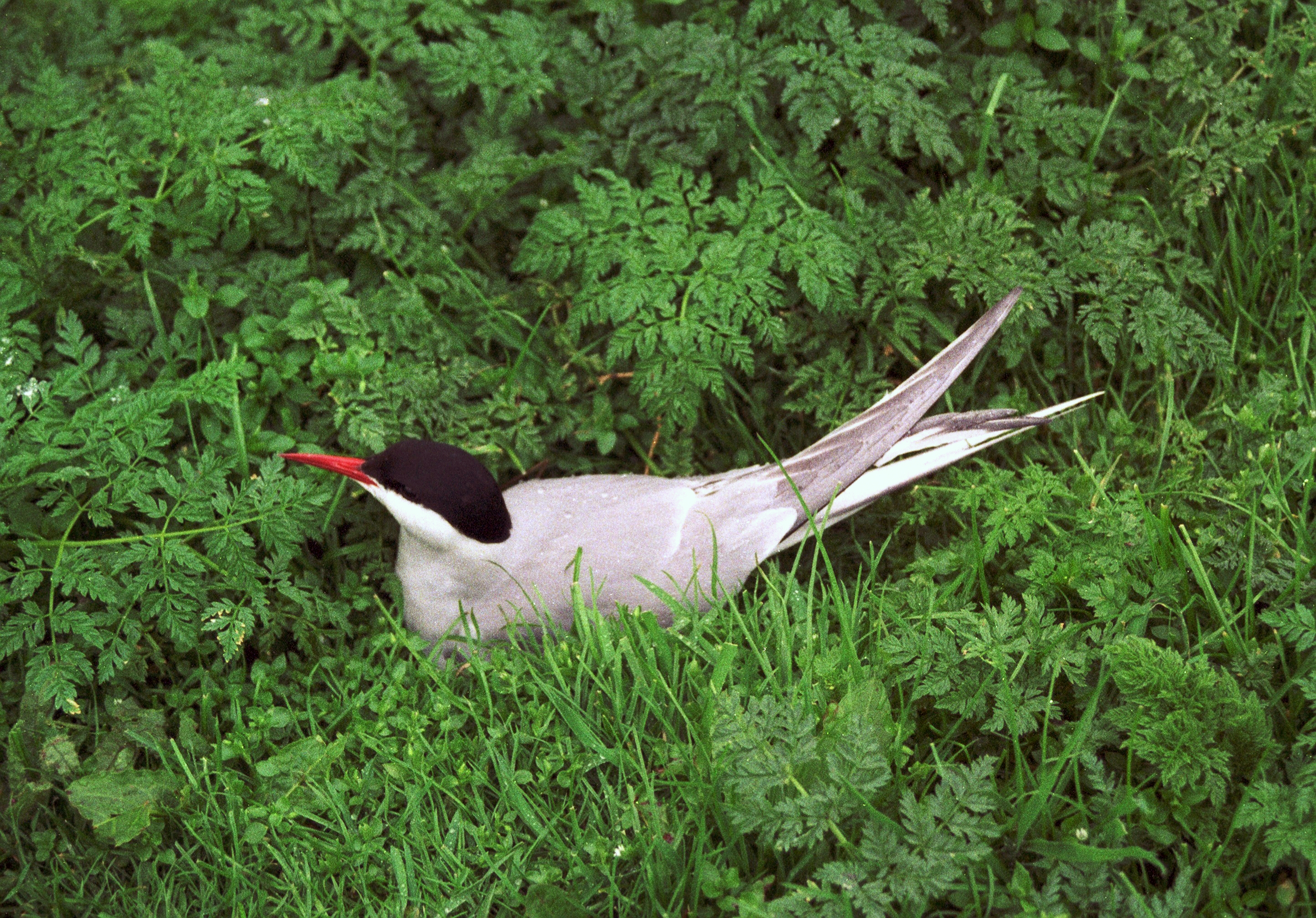
Arctic terns breed in the arctic and subarctic and winter in Antarctica.

Like many birds, seabirds often migrate after the breeding season. Of these, the trip taken by the Arctic tern is the farthest of any bird, crossing the equator in order to spend the Austral summer in Antarctica. Other species also undertake trans-equatorial trips, both from the north to the south, and from south to north. The population of elegant terns, which nest off Baja California, splits after the breeding season with some birds travelling north to the Central Coast of California and some travelling as far south as Peru and Chile to feed in the Humboldt Current. The sooty shearwater undertakes an annual migration cycle that rivals that of the Arctic tern; birds that nest in New Zealand and Chile and spend the northern summer feeding in the North Pacific off Japan, Alaska and California, an annual round trip of 64,000 kilometres (40,000 mi).

Other species also migrate shorter distances away from the breeding sites, their distribution at sea determined by the availability of food. If oceanic conditions are unsuitable, seabirds will emigrate to more productive areas, sometimes permanently if the bird is young. After fledging, juvenile birds often disperse further than adults, and to different areas, so are commonly sighted far from a species' normal range. Some species, such as the auks, do not have a concerted migration effort, but drift southwards as the winter approaches. Other species, such as some of the storm petrels, diving petrels and cormorants, never disperse at all, staying near their breeding colonies year round.

=== Away from the sea ===
While the definition of seabirds suggests that the birds in question spend their lives on the ocean, many seabird families have many species that spend some or even most of their lives inland away from the sea. Most strikingly, many species breed tens, hundreds or even thousands of miles inland. Some of these species still return to the ocean to feed; for example, the snow petrel, the nests of which have been found 480 kilometres (300 mi) inland on the Antarctic mainland, are unlikely to find anything to eat around their breeding sites. The marbled murrelet nests inland in old growth forest, seeking huge conifers with large branches to nest on. Other species, such as the California gull, nest and feed inland on lakes, and then move to the coasts in the winter. Some cormorant, pelican, gull and tern species have individuals that never visit the sea at all, spending their lives on lakes, rivers, swamps and, in the case of some of the gulls, cities and agricultural land. In these cases, it is thought that these terrestrial or freshwater birds evolved from marine ancestors. Some seabirds, principally those that nest in tundra, as skuas and phalaropes do, will migrate over land as well.

The more marine species, such as petrels, auks and gannets, are more restricted in their habits, but are occasionally seen inland as vagrants. This most commonly happens to young inexperienced birds, but can happen in great numbers to exhausted adults after large storms, an event known as a wreck.

== Relationship with humans ==
=== Seabirds and fisheries ===
Seabirds have had a long association with both fisheries and sailors, and both have drawn benefits and disadvantages from the relationship.

Fishers have traditionally used seabirds as indicators of both fish shoals, underwater banks that might indicate fish stocks, and of potential landfall. In fact, the known association of seabirds with land was instrumental in allowing the Polynesians to locate tiny landmasses in the Pacific. Seabirds have provided food for fishers away from home, as well as bait. Famously, tethered cormorants have been used to catch fish directly. Indirectly, fisheries have also benefited from guano from colonies of seabirds acting as fertilizer for the surrounding seas.

Negative effects on fisheries include raiding by birds on aquaculture, and bait loss and accidental catching of seabirds as bycatch, meaning fewer intended targets are captured. There have been claims of prey depletion by seabirds of fishery stocks, and while there is some evidence of this, the effects of seabirds are considered smaller than that of marine mammals and predatory fish (like tuna).

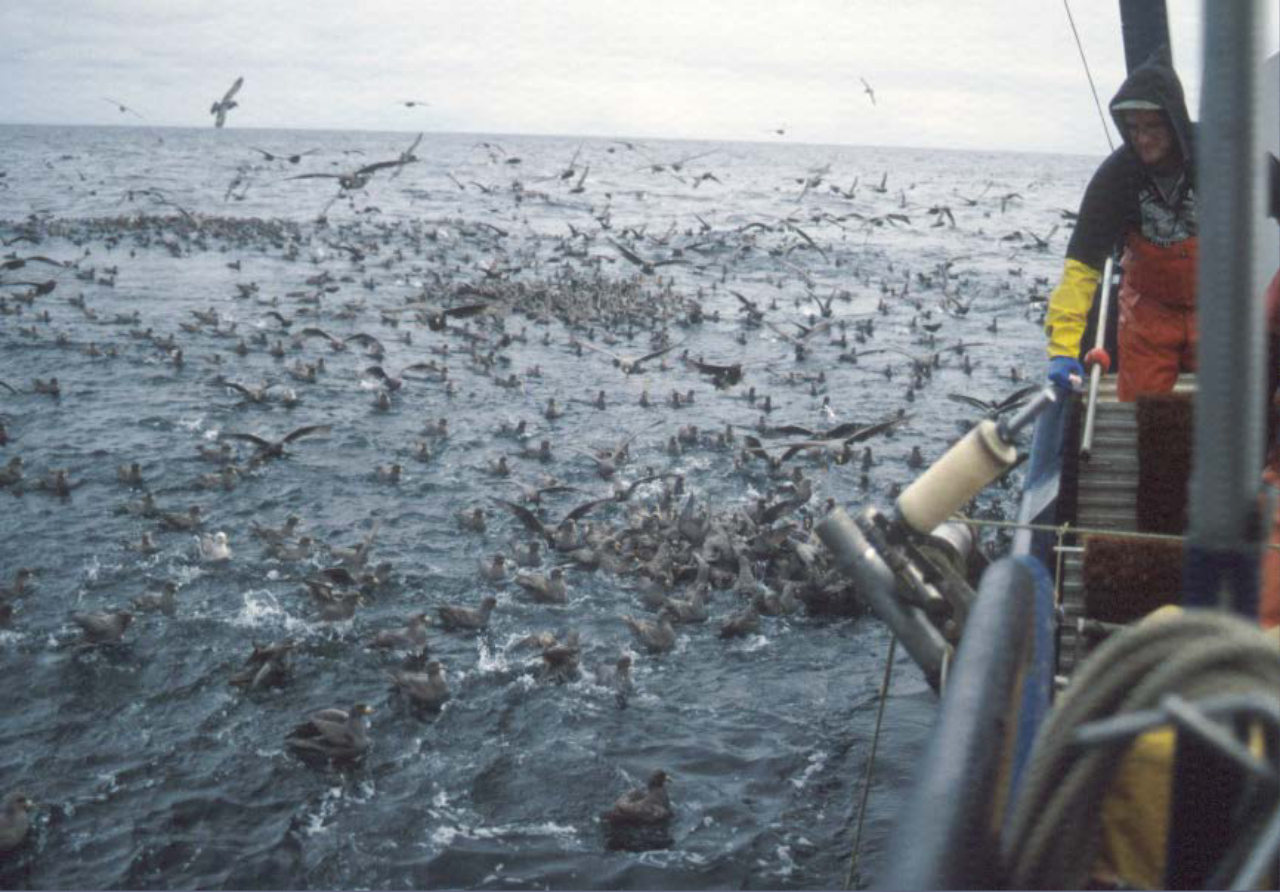
Seabirds (mostly northern fulmars) flocking at a long-lining vessel

There have been some benefits of fisheries to seabirds, for example discarded fish and offal being made available to opportunistic scavengers. These discards compose 30% of the food of seabirds in the North Sea and up to 70% of the total food of some seabird populations. Increased availability of fishery discards can significantly impact seabird population trends; for example, the increase of northern fulmar populations in the United Kingdom is attributed in part to the increased availability of discards. Due to policy reforms such as discard bans, discard volume has been greatly reduced, which is likely to lead to population depletion of species that rely on such food sources.

Fisheries also have negative effects on seabirds, particularly via fisheries bycatch and prey depletion. The bycatch of seabirds entangled in nets or hooked on fishing lines has a big impact on seabird population sizes; for example, an estimated 160,000-330,000 seabirds are caught on longlines annually, with albatrosses, petrels and shearwaters appearing most vulnerable to this type of fishing gear. Pursuit divers, such as penguins, guillemots, and sea ducks, are more likely to become entangled in gillnets, in which an estimated 400,000 seabirds die annually. Overall, many hundreds of thousands of birds are trapped and killed each year, a source of concern many species, particularly those that are long-lived and slow-breeding, and/or are already close to extinction. Seabirds also suffer when overfishing occurs. Changes to the marine ecosystems caused by dredging, which alters the biodiversity of the seafloor, can also have a negative impact.

=== Exploitation ===
The hunting of seabirds and the collecting of seabird eggs have contributed to the declines of many species, and the extinction of several, including the great auk and the spectacled cormorant. Seabirds have been hunted for food by coastal peoples throughout history—one of the earliest instances known is in southern Chile, where archaeological excavations in middens has shown hunting of albatrosses, cormorants and shearwaters from 5000 BP. This pressure has led to some species becoming extinct in many places; in particular, at least 20 species of an original 29 no longer breed on Easter Island. In the 19th century, the hunting of seabirds for fat deposits and feathers for the millinery trade reached industrial levels. Muttonbirding (harvesting shearwater chicks) developed as important industries in both New Zealand and Tasmania, and the name of one species, the providence petrel, is derived from its seemingly miraculous arrival on Norfolk Island where it provided a windfall for starving European settlers. In the Falkland Islands, hundreds of thousands of penguins were harvested for their oil each year. Seabird eggs have also long been an important source of food for sailors undertaking long sea voyages, as well as being taken when settlements grow in areas near a colony. Eggers from San Francisco took almost half a million eggs a year from the Farallon Islands in the mid-19th century, a period in the islands' history from which the seabird species are still recovering.

Both hunting and egging continue today, although not at the levels that occurred in the past, and generally in a more controlled manner. For example, the Māori of Stewart Island continue to harvest the chicks of the sooty shearwater as they have done for centuries, using traditional stewardship, kaitiakitanga, to manage the harvest, but now also work with the University of Otago in studying the populations. In Greenland, however, uncontrolled hunting is pushing many species into steep decline.

=== Other threats ===
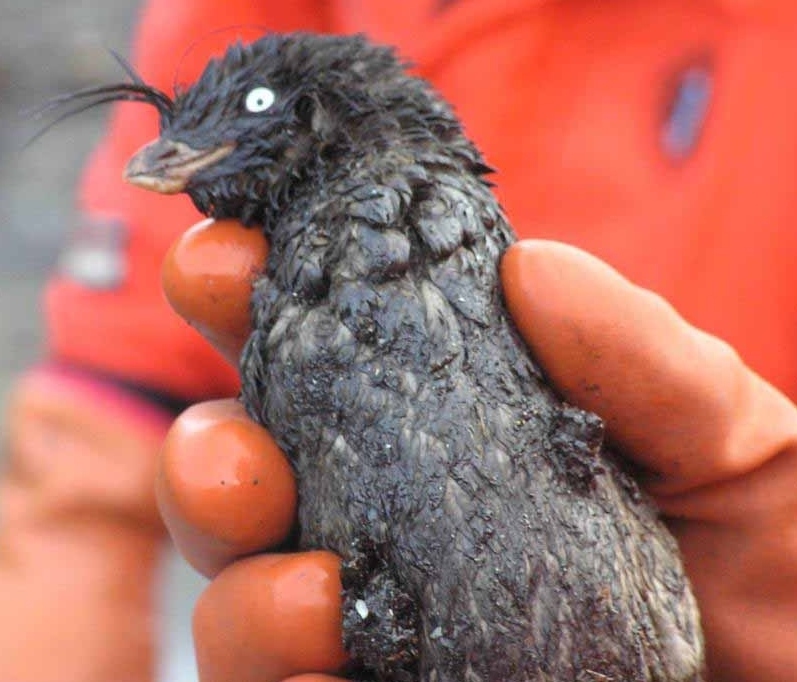
This crested auklet was oiled in Alaska during the spill of MV Selendang Ayu in 2004.

Other human factors have led to declines and even extinctions in seabird populations and species. Of these, perhaps the most serious are introduced species. Seabirds, breeding predominantly on small isolated islands, are vulnerable to predators because they have lost many behaviours associated with defence from predators. Feral cats can take seabirds as large as albatrosses, and many introduced rodents, such as the Pacific rat, take eggs hidden in burrows. Introduced goats, cattle, rabbits and other herbivores can create problems, particularly when species need vegetation to protect or shade their young. The disturbance of breeding colonies by humans is often a problem as well—visitors, even well-meaning tourists, can flush brooding adults off a colony, leaving chicks and eggs vulnerable to predators and meaning adults spend more energy due to these increased flights.

The build-up of toxins and pollutants in seabirds is also a concern. Seabirds, being apex predators, suffered from the ravages of the insecticide DDT until it was banned; DDT was implicated, for example, in embryo development problems and the skewed sex ratio of western gulls in southern California. Oil spills are also a threat to seabirds: the oil is toxic, and bird feathers become saturated by the oil, causing them to lose their waterproofing. Oil pollution in particular threatens species with restricted ranges or already depressed populations. Seabirds can also collide with oil platforms, as well as other offshore structures such as wind farms and ships.

Climate change mainly can affect seabirds via multiple pathways, such as changes to their habitat, with various processes in the ocean having led to decreased availability of food. Seabird breeding colonies are more often flooded as a consequence of sea level rise and extreme rainfall or storm events, with heat stress from extreme temperatures posing an additional threat. Some seabirds have used changing wind patterns to forage further and more efficiently.

In 2023, plasticosis, a new disease caused solely by plastics, was discovered in seabirds. The birds identified as having the disease have scarred digestive tracts from ingesting plastic waste. "When birds ingest small pieces of plastic, they found, it inflames the digestive tract. Over time, the persistent inflammation causes tissues to become scarred and disfigured, affecting digestion, growth and survival."

=== Conservation ===
The threats faced by seabirds have not gone unnoticed by scientists or the conservation movement. As early as 1903, U.S. President Theodore Roosevelt was convinced of the need to declare Pelican Island in Florida a National Wildlife Refuge to protect the bird colonies (including the nesting brown pelicans), and in 1909 he protected the Farallon Islands. Today many important seabird colonies are given some measure of protection, from Heron Island in Australia to Triangle Island in British Columbia.

Island restoration techniques, pioneered by New Zealand, enable the removal of exotic invaders from increasingly large islands. Feral cats have been removed from Ascension Island, Arctic foxes from many islands in the Aleutian Islands, and rats from Campbell Island. The removal of these introduced species has led to increases in numbers of species under pressure and even the return of extirpated ones. After the removal of cats from Ascension Island, seabirds began to nest there again for the first time in over a hundred years.

Seabird mortality caused by long-line fisheries can be greatly reduced by techniques such as setting long-line bait at night, dying the bait blue, setting the bait underwater, increasing the amount of weight on lines and by using bird scarers, and their deployment is increasingly required by many national fishing fleets.

One of the Millennium Projects in the UK was the Scottish Seabird Centre, near the important bird sanctuaries on Bass Rock, Fidra and the surrounding islands. The area is home to huge colonies of gannets, puffins, skuas and other seabirds. The centre allows visitors to watch live video from the islands as well as learn about the threats the birds face and how we can protect them, and has helped to significantly raise the profile of seabird conservation in the UK. Seabird tourism can provide income for coastal communities as well as raise the profile of seabird conservation, although it needs to be managed to ensure it does not harm the colonies and nesting birds. For example, the northern royal albatross colony at Taiaroa Head in New Zealand attracts 40,000 visitors a year.

The plight of albatross and large seabirds, as well as other marine creatures, being taken as bycatch by long-line fisheries, has been addressed by a large number of non-governmental organizations (including BirdLife International, the American Bird Conservancy and the Royal Society for the Protection of Birds). This led to the Agreement on the Conservation of Albatrosses and Petrels, a legally binding treaty designed to protect these threatened species, which has been ratified by thirteen countries as of 2021 (Argentina, Australia, Brazil, Chile, Ecuador, France, New Zealand, Norway, Peru, South Africa, Spain, Uruguay, United Kingdom).

Actions that can be used to directly manage the impacts of climate change on seabirds include: constructing fire breaks around seabird nesting areas; replacing coastal habitat lost to sea level rise (e.g. by allowing inland migration of habitats or providing artificial platforms); and temporarily raising nests to keep them above flood waters. These actions can be supported by general conservation work to maintain population sizes and genetic diversity, and consequently the ability of seabird populations to resist or adapt to climate change. Global mitigation of climate change (e.g., through decarbonization and ecosystem restoration) will also be important to reduce the impacts to which seabirds are exposed.

=== Role in culture ===
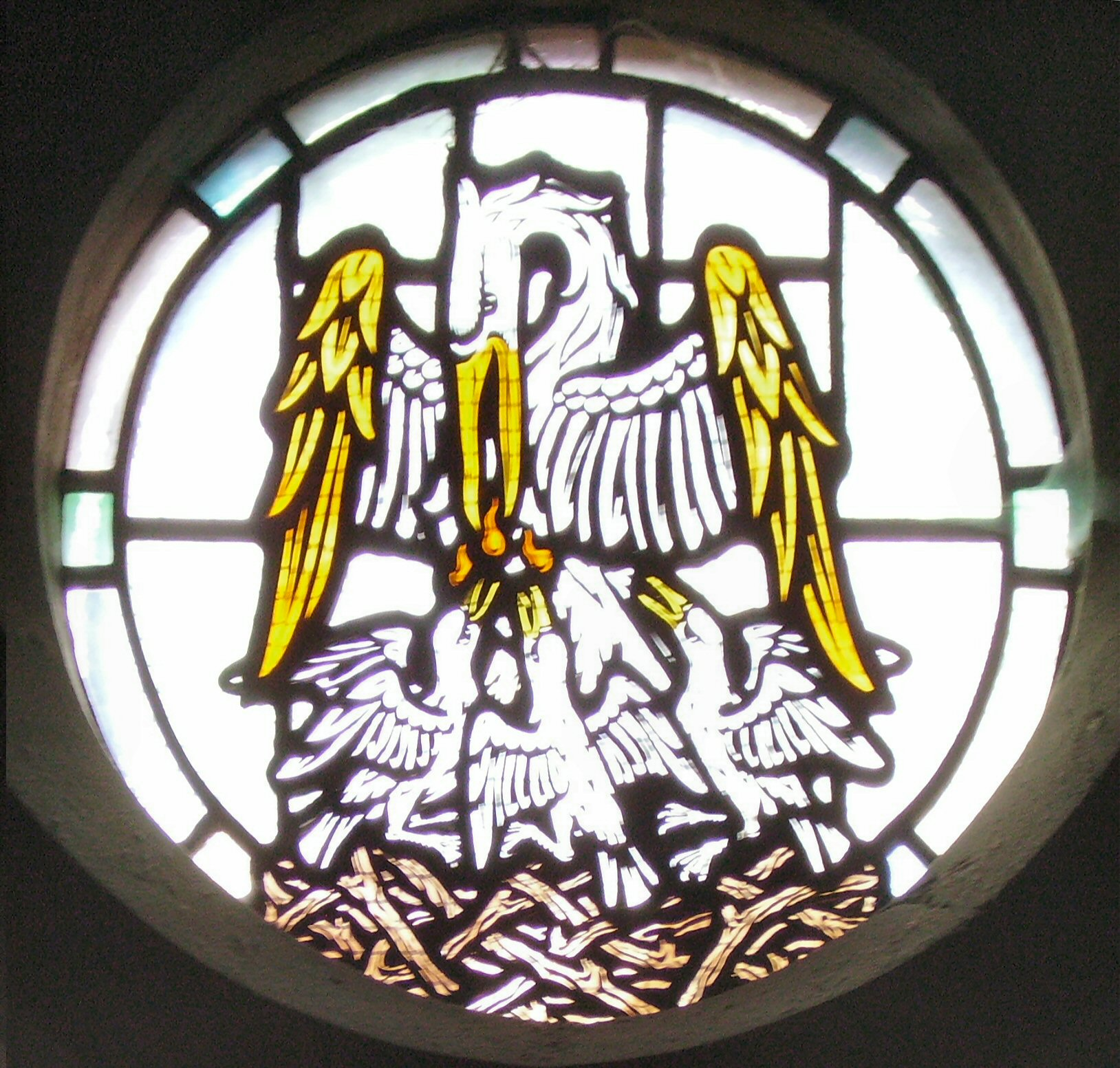
Depiction of a pelican with chicks on a stained glass window, Saint Mark's Church, Gillingham, Kent

Many seabirds are little studied and poorly known because they live far out at sea and breed in isolated colonies. Some seabirds, particularly the albatrosses and gulls, are more well known to humans. The albatross has been described as "the most legendary of birds", and have a variety of myths and legends associated with them. While it is widely considered unlucky to harm them, the notion that sailors believed that is a myth that derives from Samuel Taylor Coleridge's famous poem, "The Rime of the Ancient Mariner", in which a sailor is punished for killing an albatross by having to wear its corpse around his neck. Sailors did, however, consider it unlucky to touch a storm petrel, especially one that landed on the ship.

Gulls are one of the most commonly seen seabirds because they frequent human-made habitats (such as cities and dumps) and often show a fearless nature. Gulls have been used as metaphors, as in Jonathan Livingston Seagull by Richard Bach, or to denote a closeness to the sea; in The Lord of the Rings, they appear in the insignia of Gondor and therefore Númenor (used in the design of the films), and they call Legolas to (and across) the sea. Pelicans have long been associated with mercy and altruism because of an early Christian myth that they split open their breast to feed their starving chicks.

== Seabird families ==
The following are the groups of birds normally classed as seabirds. For each order, the species counts given are for only the seabird portions (i.e. the listed groups), not the total number of species.

Sphenisciformes (18 species; Antarctic and southern waters)

- Spheniscidae: penguins

Procellariiformes (149 species; pan-oceanic and pelagic)

- Diomedeidae: albatrosses
- Procellariidae: petrels (including fulmars, prions, shearwaters, gadfly petrels, diving petrels, and other petrels)
- Hydrobatidae: northern storm petrels
- Oceanitidae: southern storm petrels

Pelecaniformes (8 species; worldwide)

- Pelecanidae: pelicans

Suliformes (57 species; worldwide)

- Sulidae: gannets and boobies
- Phalacrocoracidae: cormorants
- Fregatidae: frigatebirds

Phaethontiformes (3 species; worldwide tropical seas)

- Phaethontidae: tropicbirds

Charadriiformes (138 species; worldwide)

- Laridae: larids (including gulls, terns, and skimmers)
- Stercorariidae: skuas
- Alcidae: auks
- Genus Phalaropus within Scolopacidae: phalaropes

For an alternative taxonomy of these groups, see also Sibley-Ahlquist taxonomy.
