= Gulf Wild =

US-based nonprofit organization

- Type: Nonprofit
- Tax ID no.: 46-2090265
- Legal status: 501(c)(5)
- Headquarters: Madeira Beach, Florida
- Region served: Fisheries of the Gulf of Mexico
- Website: www.gulfwild.com

Gulf Wild is a nonprofit organization operating in the Gulf of Mexico. Gulf Wild works with commercial fishermen to encourage and facilitate fishery conservation and innovation. Gulf Wild has implemented traceability practices, including placing a numbered gill tag on every Gulf Water fish. This numbered tag tracks who harvested the fish, from where, and at what port the fish landed. The organization's website can be used to check gill tags.

== Conservation standards ==
Gulf Wild fishermen adhere to the following current national and international regulations:

- The Gulf of Mexico Reef Fish Management Plan and amendments.
- Science-based quotas
- Gear Restrictions, including turtle excluder devices and area closures to reduce sea turtle interactions
- Compliance with Federal Fisheries Observer Program.
- Individual Fishing Quota (IFQ) requirements including active IFQ accounts to catch, hold, land, sell and/or transport fish
- Monitoring/enforcement including fishing call-in/call-out to federal authorities, 24/7 vessel monitoring and random checks by enforcement officers

Fishery Improvement Projects (FIP)

Gulf Wild vessels and fishermen also participate in Fishery Improvement Projects (FIP) to address sustainability issues in the Gulf of Mexico fishery.

== See also ==
- Fish of the Gulf of Mexico
- Fish of the Caribbean
