= Longline bycatch in Hawaii =

The Hawaii longline fishery is managed under Western Pacific Regional Fishery Management Council’s (WPRFMC's) Pelagics Fisheries Ecosystem Plan (formerly Pelagics Fisheries Management Plan). Through this plan, the WPRFMC has introduced logbooks, observers, vessel monitoring systems, fishing gear modifications and spatial management for the Hawaii longline fishery. Until relatively recently, the main driver for management of the Hawaii longline fishery has been bycatch and not fishery resources.

The revival of the Hawaii longline fleet in the late 1980s meant that larger ocean-going longline vessels began operating from Honolulu. The advent of the new fleet was driven primarily by targeting swordfish, which meant using squid bait on hooks deployed in relatively shallow depths (<30 m) and with light sticks attached to the branch lines. Observers began to be employed on vessels in 1994 and it soon became apparent that in the shallow set fishery there were catches of sea turtles and seabirds. The principal seabirds caught were black-footed and Laysan albatross, and for the turtles, loggerheads and leatherbacks. There were turtle and seabird interactions in the deep set fishery also, but these were one to two orders of magnitude lower than in the shallow set fishery.

== Seabird Bycatch Mitigation Development ==
Prior to 2001, 1380 black footed albatross and 1163 Laysan albatrosses were caught annually by the Hawaii longline fishery. The WPRFMC's response to the volume of seabirds being caught was to mount a project through 1998 and 1999 to test various seabird mitigation methods. It was found that during gear setting operations, blue dyed baits were the most successful mitigation method, followed by strategic offal discards. Tori lines and a towed buoy system also proved to be effective mitigation measures during the set. During hauling operations, blue dyed baited and tori lines were found to be equally effective mitigation strategies, followed by the towed buoy. Retaining offal on the vessel during the haul increased seabird interactions.

The National Marine Fisheries Service Pacific Islands Fisheries Science Center (NMFS PIFSC) also tested tori lines, blue dyed bait and weighted hooks in 1999, They found that baits dyed blue and baits with additional weight reduced the number of interactions with both black-footed and Laysan albatross. Tori lines reduced contact between baits and albatrosses by 70%

The WPRFMC's plan for implementing seabird mitigation measures was for a Fishery Management Plan (FMP) amendment where fishermen could choose the measures from a selected list of proven mitigation methods. However, this was forestalled by a 2000 US Fish and Wildlife Service Biological Opinion (BiOp) on the endangered Short-tailed albatross in, which prescribed what seabird mitigation measures would be used by the tuna-targeting (deep sets) and by swordfish (shallow sets) as follows:

=== Summary of seabird deterrent measures by set type ===
Seabird deterrent measure	Tuna (deep sets)	Swordfish (shallow sets)
Thawed baits	Required	Required
Blue dyed baits	Required for all baits	Required for all baits
Discharge offal	Required	Required
Night Sets	Optional	Required
Line setting machine with weighted branch lines (minimum weight = 45 g)	Required	Optional
Weighted branch lines (minimum weight = 45 g)	Optional	Optional
Towed deterrent	Optional	Optional

The WPRFMC incorporated these measures into a Pelagics FMP amendment in 2002, requiring that these seabird mitigation measures be used when fishing north of 23 deg N. This measure was further refined in 2006 by an FMP amendment that allowed operators of Hawaii-based longline vessels fishing north of 23 degrees north latitude, as well as those targeting swordfish south of 23 degrees north, to utilize side-setting to reduce seabird interactions in lieu of the seabird mitigation already measures required.

The implementation of the seabird measures caused a massive drop in seabird interactions by more than 90% in the Hawaii longline fishery.

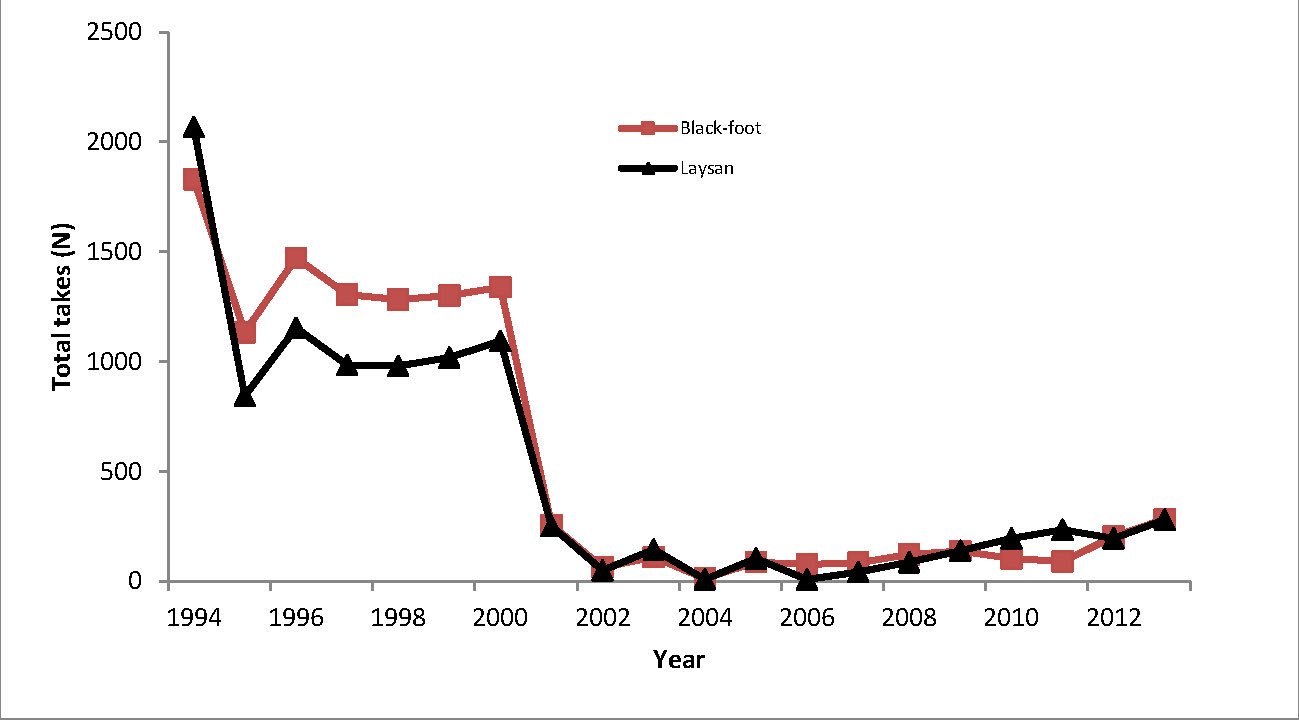
The graph illustrates the drop of seabird interaction with the Hawaii Longline Fishery when utilizing bycatch mitigation techniques

== Sea Turtle Bycatch Mitigation Development ==
Despite low observer coverage, usually 5% or less, it was estimated that prior to 2001, a total of 666 turtles were caught annually in the Hawaii longline fishery: 418 loggerheads, 146 olive ridleys, 112 leatherbacks and 40 green turtles.

Unlike the seabird issue, the solutions for sea turtles were propelled initially by litigation by environmental organizations which resulted in a complete closure of the shallow set longline fishery between 2001 and 2004. Over these years, the Hawaii fishery was only permitted to target tunas. An FMP amendment in 2002 incorporated reasonable and prudent alternative of the March 2001 Biological Opinion issued by NMFS. This amendment prohibited shallow set pelagic longlining north of the equator and closed waters between 0° and 15° N from April–May annually to longline fishing. It instituted sea turtle handling requirements for all vessels using hooks to target pelagic species in the region's EEZ waters and extended the protected species workshop requirement to include the operators of vessels registered to longline general permits

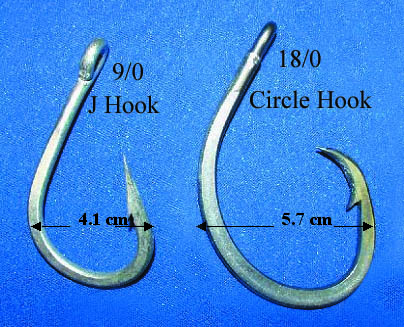

Salvation was at hand, however, for the shallow-set longline fishery, based on hook research by NMFS Fisheries Engineering Laboratory in Pascagoula, Mississippi. This research found that large 18/0 circle hooks combined with mackerel type fish bait could sharply reduce loggerhead and leatherback interactions of longline vessels fishing on the Grand Banks for swordfish. The WPRFMC operationalized this technology in an FMP amendment which established a limited Hawaii-based shallow-set swordfish fishery using circle hooks with mackerel bait.

Fishing effort in the shallow-set swordfish fishery was limited to 50% of the 1994-1999 annual average number of sets (just over 2,100 sets) allocated between fishermen applying to participate in the fishery. A ‘hard’ limit on the number of leatherback (16) and loggerhead (17) turtle interactions that could occur in the swordfish fishery was implemented; the fishery closed for the remainder of the calendar year if either limit was reached. The amendment re-implemented earlier sea turtle handling and resuscitation requirements and included conservation projects to protect sea turtles in their nesting and coastal habitats. This rule implemented the requirement for night setting imposed by the USFWS Biological Opinion on Hawaii-based longline vessels targeting swordfish north of 23 degrees north latitude. The new measures resulted in a >90% reduction in sea turtles interactions in the Hawaii longline fishery. A later amendment to the Fishery Ecosystem Plan (FEP) removed the set limits and increased the loggerhead and leatherback hard caps of 34 and 26 respectively.

=== Sea turtle bycatch in American Samoa ===
The deployment of observers in the American Samoa longline fleet revealed that the fishery was interacting with green sea turtles. Most of the turtle hooking's occurred on hooks close to the float, i.e. the shallower hooks on the longline catenary. The WPRFMC response was to amend the FEP and required fishermen on vessels longer than 40 ft to use float lines that are at least 30 meters long, and maintain a distance between float lines and adjacent branch lines with hooks of at least 70 meters. Fishermen on these longer vessels are required to deploy at least 15 branch lines between floats.

The new measure reduced green sea turtle interactions by about 75%, but the concentration of hooks at deeper depths meant that the American Samoa fishery had higher interaction rates with deep diving leatherback and olive ridley sea turtles.

== Marine Mammal Bycatch Mitigation Development ==
Marine mammals have become a problem for the Hawaii longline fishery due to a limited population of island associated false killer whales (FKWs) in the Main Hawaiian Islands(MHI) and interactions with a wider ‘pelagic’ population within the US EEZ around Hawaii. The island associated population was listed as ‘endangered’ under the Endangered Species Act in 2012. The interactions with the wider pelagic population drove the creation of the False Killer Whale Take Reduction Team (FKWTRT) in 2010, which developed a Take Reduction Plan (TRP) published towards the end of 2012 and with some provisions being implemented in early 2013.

The TRP required a number of different actions as follows:

- Require the use of circle hooks that have a maximum wire diameter of 4.5 mm (0.177 in), 10 degree offset or less, containing round (non-flattened) wire that can be measured with a caliper or other appropriate gauge in the Hawaii-based deep-set fishery;
- Establish a minimum 2.0 mm (0.079 in) diameter for monofilament leaders and branch lines, and a minimum breaking strength of 400 pounds (181 kg) for any other material used in the construction of a leader or branch line in the Hawaii-based deep-set longline fishery;
- Establish a longline exclusion zone around the MHI that is closed to longline fishing year-round; the 282,796 km2 (82,450 nmi2) area has the same name and boundary as the February–September boundary of the MHI Longline Prohibited Area;
- Expand the content of the existing, mandatory Protected Species Workshop for the Hawaii-based longline fishery to include new information on marine mammal interaction mitigation techniques;
- Require a NMFS-approved marine mammal handling and release informational placard to be posted onboard all Hawaii-based longline vessels;
- Require the captain of the longline vessel to supervise the handling and release of any hooked or entangled marine mammal;
- Require a NMFS-approved placard that instructs the vessel crew to notify the captain in the event of a marine mammal interaction be posted onboard all Hawaii-based longline vessels; and
- Establish a “Southern Exclusion Zone” (SEZ) that will be closed to the commercial Hawaii-based deep-set longline fishery for varying periods of time whenever specific levels of serious injuries or mortalities of false killer whales are observed within the U.S. EEZ around Hawaii.

Solving the FKW problem remains a major challenge to the Hawaii longline fishery. It is unlikely that the fishery interacts with the MHI FKW population, though some level of take is attributed to this population from observed takes of FKW. Interactions with the larger (1500 animals) pelagic population may continue to be greater than the Potential Biological Removals for this population.

== Positive Side Notes ==
Dealing with bycatch in the Hawaii longline fishery has had some unintended spin-offs including the reduction of shark catches by about 50%.
