= Final good =

Commodity which is produced and subsequently consumed by the consumer

A final good or consumer good is a final product ready for sale that is used by the consumer to satisfy current wants or needs, unlike an intermediate good, which is used to produce other goods. A microwave oven or a bicycle is a final good.

When used in measures of national income and output, the term "final goods" includes only new goods. For example, gross domestic product (GDP) excludes items counted in an earlier year to prevent double counting based on resale of items. In that context, the economic definition of goods also includes what are commonly known as services.

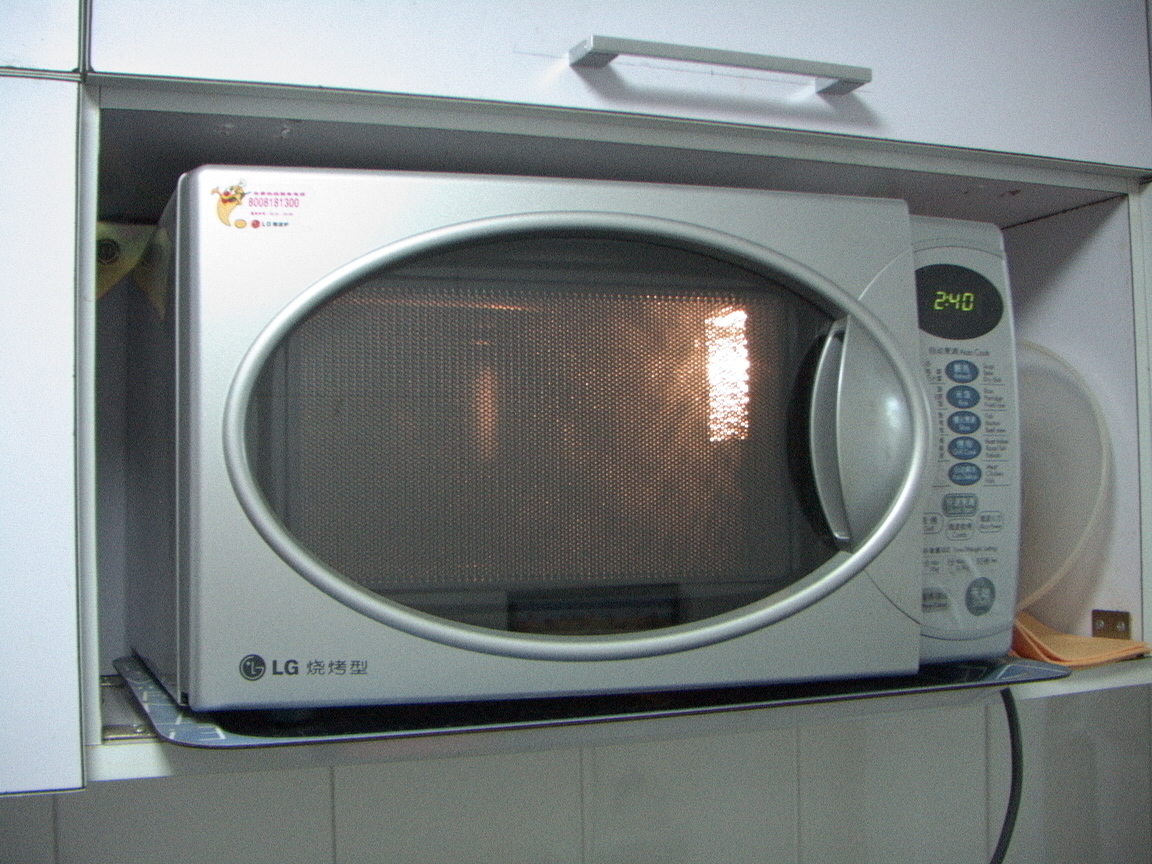
A microwave oven, c. 2005: an example of a final good or consumer good

Manufactured goods refer to products that have undergone processing or assembly, distinguishing them from raw materials.

== Law ==
Various legal definitions exist for consumer products, depending on jurisdiction. One such definition is found in the United States' Consumer Product Safety Act, which provides extensive explanation of consumer products.

CONSUMER PRODUCT.- The term ‘‘consumer product’’ means any article, or component part thereof, produced or distributed (i) for sale to a consumer for use in or around a permanent or temporary household or residence, a school, in recreation, or otherwise, or (ii) for the personal use, consumption, or enjoyment of a consumer in or around a permanent or temporary household or residence, a school, in recreation, or otherwise; but such term does not include— (A) any article which is not customarily produced or distributed for sale to, or use or consumption by, or enjoyment of, a consumer,

It then goes on to list eight additional specific exclusions and further details.

== Durability ==
Final goods can be classified into the following categories:

1. Durable goods
2. Nondurable goods
3. Services

Consumer durable goods usually have a significant lifespan, which tends to be at least one year, based on the guarantee or warranty period. The maximum life depends upon the durability of the product or goods. Examples include tools, cars, and boats. On the other hand, capital goods, which are tangible in nature, such as machinery or building or any other equipment that can be used in manufacturing of final product, are durable goods with limited lifespans that are determined by manufacturers before their sale. The longevity and the often-higher cost of durable goods usually cause consumers to postpone expenditures on them, which makes durables the most volatile (or cost-dependent) component of consumption.

Consumer nondurable goods are purchased for immediate use or for use very soon. Generally, the lifespan of nondurable goods is from a few minutes to up to three years: food, beverages, clothing, shoes and gasoline are examples. In everyday language, nondurable goods get consumed or "used up".

Consumer services are intangible in nature. They cannot be seen, felt or tasted by the consumer but still give satisfaction to the consumer. They are also inseparable and variable in nature: they are thus produced and consumed simultaneously. Examples are haircuts, medical treatments, auto repairs and landscaping.

== Buying habits ==
Final goods can be classified into the following categories, which are determined by consumers' buying habits:

1. Convenience goods
2. Shopping goods
3. Specialty goods
4. Unsought goods

Convenience goods, shopping goods, and specialty goods are also known as "red goods", "yellow goods", and "orange goods", respectively, under the yellow, red and orange goods classification system.

=== Convenience goods ===
Convenience goods are frequently used and readily available. Generally, convenience goods fall under the category of nondurable goods, such as fast food, cigarettes and tobacco, which are typically low-cost. Convenience goods are primarily sold by wholesalers or retailers in large volumes to ensure widespread availability to consumers. Convenience goods can further be classified into staple and impulse categories.

Staple convenience consumer goods are basic necessities for consumers. These goods are easily available and in large quantities, such as milk, bread, and sugar.

Impulse convenience consumer goods do not belong to the priority list of the consumer. They are purchased without any prior planning, just on the basis of the impulse: potato wafers, candies, ice cream, cold drinks, etc.

=== Shopping consumer goods ===
Shopping consumer goods are the goods which take lot of time and proper planning before making purchase decision; in this case consumer does a lot of selection and comparison based on various parameters such as cost, brand, style, comfort etc., before buying an item. Shopping goods are costlier than convenience goods and are durable in nature. Consumer goods companies usually try to set up their shops and show rooms in active shopping areas to attract customer attention and their main focus is to do much advertising and promotion to attract more customers.

Examples, include clothing items, televisions, radios, footwear, home furnishings, etc.

=== Specialty consumer goods ===
Specialty goods are unique in nature; these are unusual and luxurious items available in the market. Specialty goods are mostly purchased by the upper classes of society as they are expensive in nature and difficult to afford for the middle and lower classes. Companies advertise their goods targeting the upper class. These goods do not fall under the category of necessity; rather they are purchased on the basis personal preference or desire. Brand name, uniqueness, and special features of an item are major attributes which attract customers and make them buy such products.

Examples include antiques, jewelry, wedding dresses, cars, etc.

=== Unsought consumer goods ===
Unsought goods belong to neither the necessity group of consumer goods list nor to specialty goods. They are always available in the market but are purchased by very few consumers, either based on their interest or their need for some specific reasons. The general public does not purchase such goods often.

Examples include snowshoes, fire extinguishers, etc.

== See also ==
- Back-story (production)
- Fast-moving consumer goods
- Finished goods
- Product/process distinction
