= Yellow, red and orange goods =

Classification of consumer goods

Yellow, red and orange goods are a three-part classification for consumer goods which is based on consumer buying habits, the durability of the goods, and the ways that the goods are sold. The classifications are for yellow goods, red goods, and orange goods, with orange goods (also called speciality goods) being goods that have a mix of yellow and red characteristics. The classification of goods into yellow, red, and orange categories is roughly equivalent to the categories of shopping goods, convenience goods, and specialty goods, respectively.

== Yellow goods ==
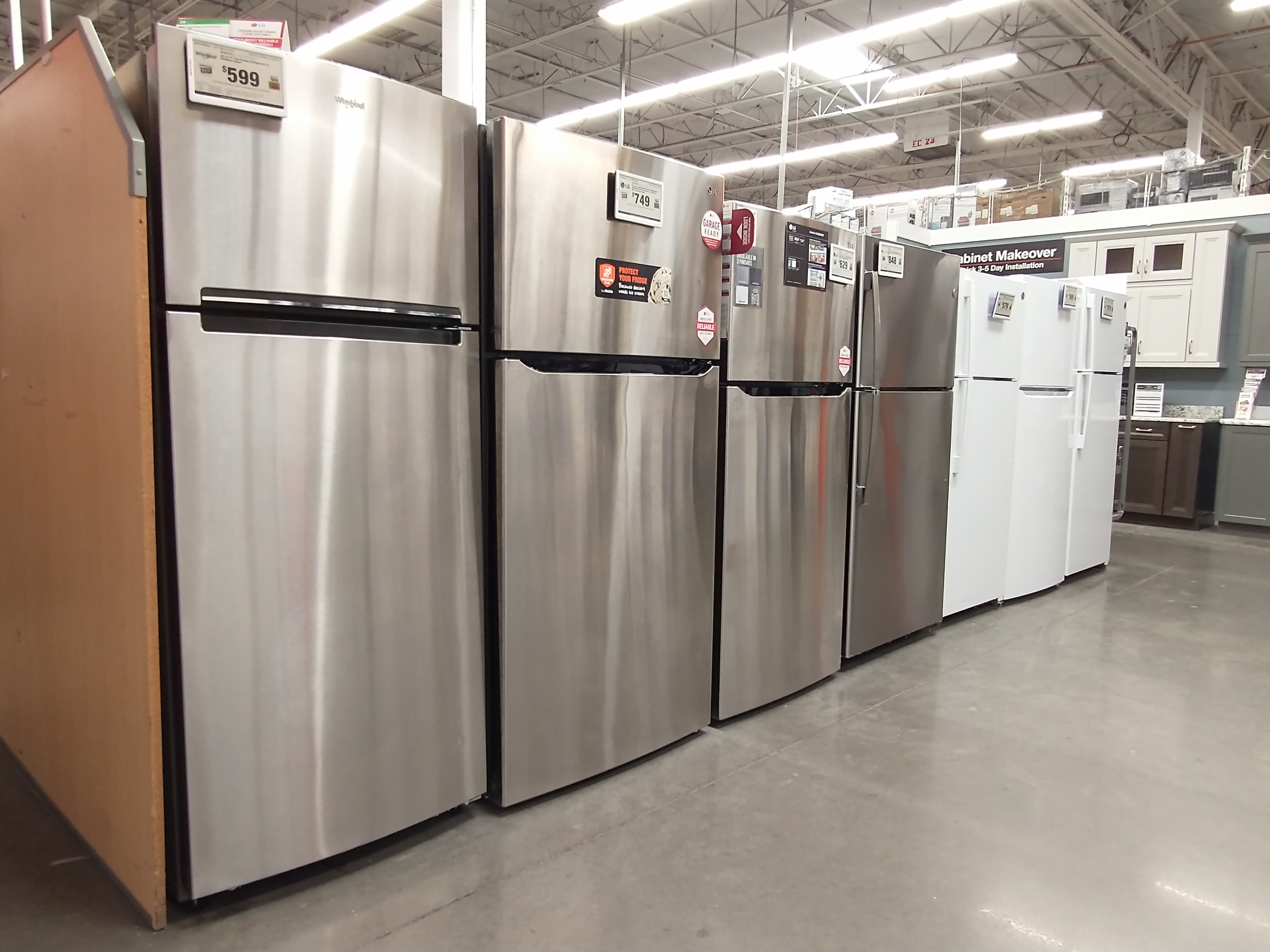
Large appliances such as refrigerators are an example of "yellow goods." They are costly and last for years, so consumers spend a longer time searching for the right model.

Yellow goods (also called "shopping goods" or "white goods") are durable consumer items such as large household appliances that have a long period of useful life, and which are replaced rarely. While yellow goods are sold in low volumes, they have high profit margins. Yellow goods have a higher unit value than convenience goods and people buy them less often; as such consumers spend more time comparison shopping for yellow goods than for red goods. As well, there is a much greater role for personal selling (from salespeople) for yellow goods than for red goods, and there is more selective distribution of yellow goods. Yellow goods often need to be adjusted or customized by the store before they are delivered to the customer.

The consumer goods term "yellow goods" is different from the construction and agricultural industry term of the same name, which refers to bulldozers, tractors, and similar equipment.

== Red goods ==
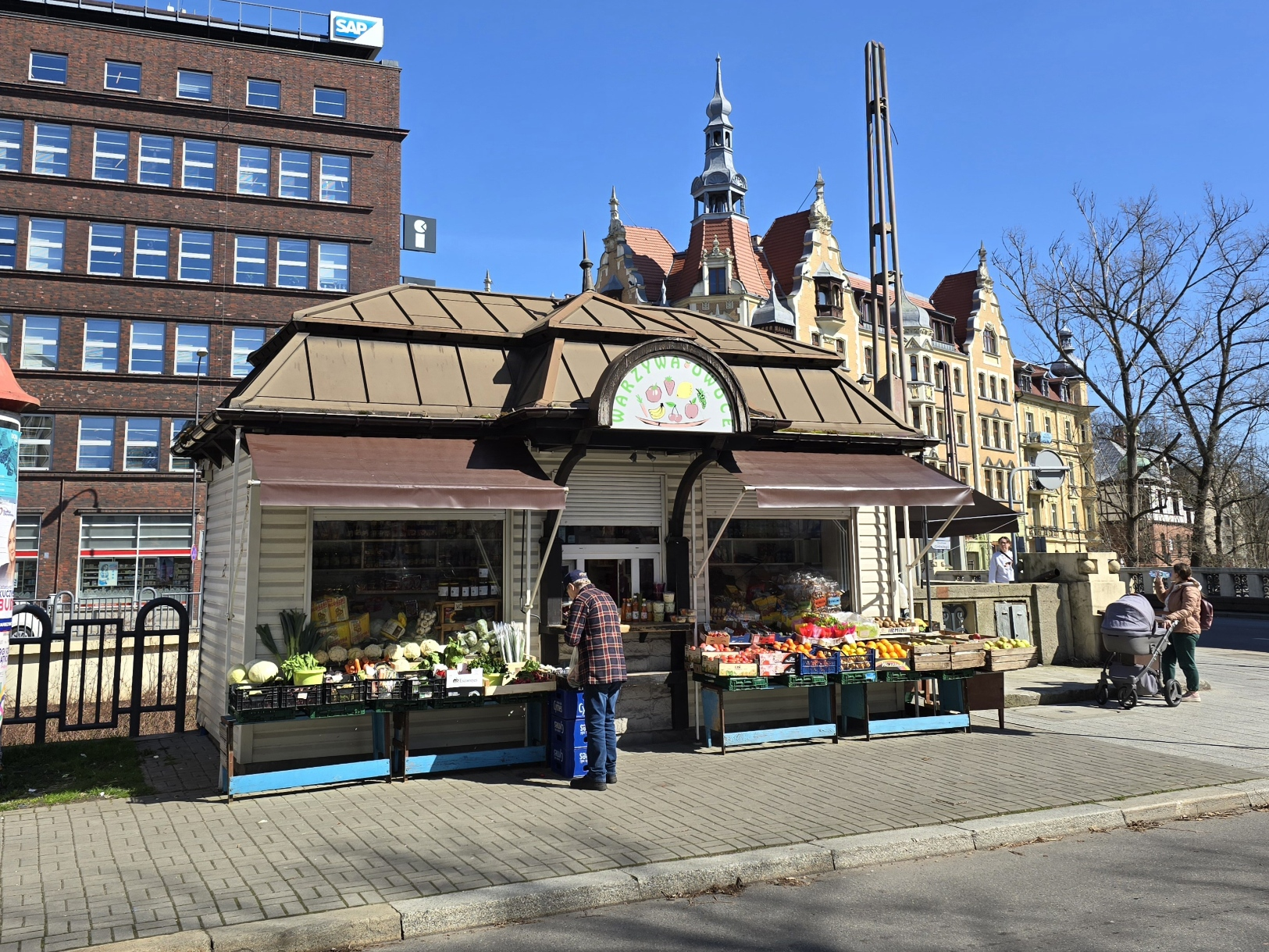
Everyday grocery items are relatively inexpensive and they have to be replaced frequently, so consumers do not typically spend much time searching and comparing options.

Red goods are relatively inexpensive items that consumers buy frequently, such as groceries and snacks. These are goods with a "high replacement rate and a low gross margin adjustment", along with a short time of consumption and a low searching time.

== Orange goods ==
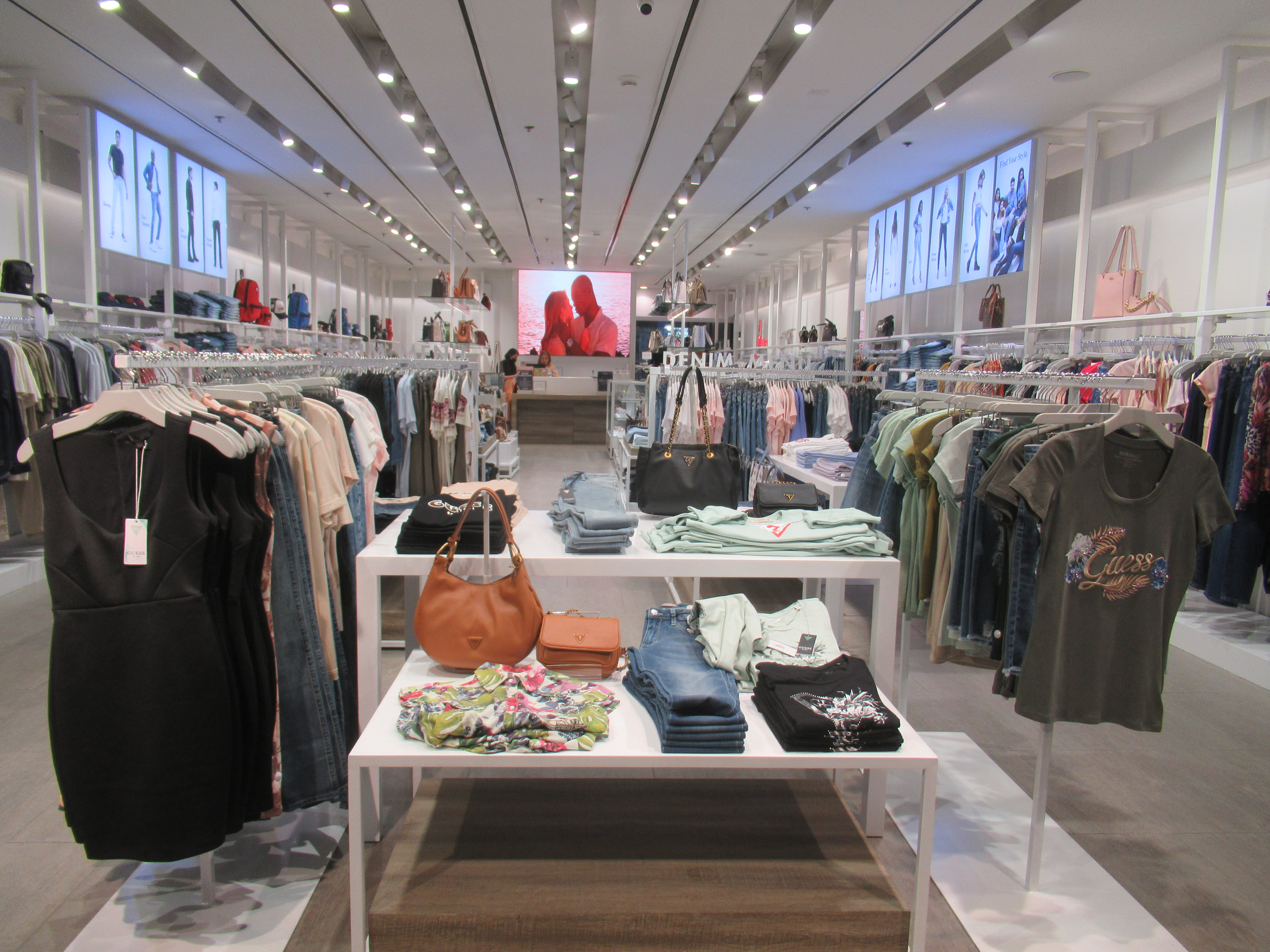
Clothing are an example of orange goods. They are reasonably durable, but they still wear out periodically and need to be replaced.

Orange goods (also called "Speciality goods") are moderately durable goods that wear out with regular use and have to be replaced, such as clothing. Orange goods are unique, so consumers need to make more effort to acquire these items; as such exclusive distributor arrangements and franchises are often used to sell them.
