= Back Story =

Back Story may refer to:

- Back Story (novel), a crime novel by Robert B. Parker
- Back Story (autobiography), an autobiography by David Mitchell
- Backstory, a set of events invented for a plot, presented as preceding and leading up to that plot
- Back-story (production), information about the effects of production
- "The Back Story" (Beverly Hills, 90210), a 1992 television episode
- "The Back Story" (Roseanne), a 1992 television episode
