= Bycatch reduction device =

Tool designed to minimize unintended capture of marine animals

In the fishery business, a bycatch reduction device is a tool designed to minimize unintended capture of marine animals, to reduce the adverse effects of fishing on the ecosystem.

== Development ==
To minimize accidental capture of marine animals, National Oceanic and Atmospheric Administration (NOAA) fisheries developed and tested bycatch reduction devices (BRDs). These devices are openings in shrimp trawl nets that allow finfish or other unwanted aquatic animals to escape, while the target species, shrimp, is directed towards the tail bag or cod end of the net. The placement and design have been developed in conjunction with normal bottom trawling practices, using trawl nets outfitted with a turtle excluder device. BRDs are required in shrimp trawl nets working in the federal waters of the Gulf of Mexico and South Atlantic regions.

A pulsed electric field-based shark and ray bycatch mitigation device, SharkGuard, was reported to have reduced bycatch of blue shark by 91% and of stingrays by 71% with commercial fishing gear in a French longline tuna fishery in the Mediterranean.

== Legal imperative ==
Officially, National Standard 9 was added to the Magnuson-Stevens Fishery Conservation and Management Act in 1996 to address the need to control the magnitude of bycatching. The standard mandates minimizing bycatch to the extent practicable and minimizing mortality of unavoidable bycatch. Congress increased requirements to protect this harvest in the Marine Mammal Protection Act and the Endangered Species Act. In response to these mandates, NOAA Fisheries (National Marine Fisheries Service) developed an ongoing by-catch plan and published Amendment 10 to the Fisheries Management Plan of the Gulf of Mexico Fisheries Management Council.

In conjunction with the plan, NOAA fisheries and other agencies collect data in order to monitor the extent and type of bycatch in all U.S. fishery regions. The associated research plan for the Gulf of Mexico and South Atlantic fisheries is available online. A portion of the Sea Grant website is dedicated to providing information and an archive of articles about the conservation efforts of commercial shrimpers associated with the use of BRDs in the Gulf of Mexico and South Atlantic regions.

== Research ==
Between 1990 and 1996, research in the Gulf of Mexico and South Atlantic shrimp trawl fisheries examined the proportions of catch and bycatch by weight. The data indicated that catches in the Gulf consisted of about 67 percent finned fish, 16 percent commercial shrimp, 13 percent non-commercial shrimp, and 4 percent other invertebrates. In the South Atlantic, the catch averaged 51 percent finned fish, 18 percent commercial shrimp, 13 percent non-commercial shrimp and crustaceans, and 18 percent non-crustacean invertebrates (by weight).

After insertion of various types of BRDs in the shrimp trawl nets, significant reductions were noted for Spanish mackerel, weakfish, croakers and spot in the South Atlantic region and for Atlantic croakers, king mackerel, Spanish mackerel and red snapper in the Gulf region. Red snapper conservation is one of the primary reasons for interest in BRDs by the Gulf of Mexico Fishery Management Council.

During 1997 and 1998, trawls in federal waters of the Gulf of Mexico and South Atlantic regions were required to insert and use a BRD in their nets. This device is installed in the cod end of a shrimp trawl for the purpose of excluding finfish from the net. Since then, NOAA fisheries have certified three types of BRDs for use in the Gulf of Mexico region: the Gulf Fisheye, the Jones-Davis, and the Fisheye BRDs; and five for the south Atlantic region: the Extended Funnel, Expanded Mesh, Fisheye, Gulf Fisheye and Jones-Davis BRDs.

According to research conducted during 2003-2004, the Extended Funnel BRD and an Expanded Mesh BRD were found to be successful in the South Atlantic, while the 12” by 5” Fisheye BRD was considered successful in both South Atlantic and Gulf of Mexico waters. These conclusions are subject to continuing research.
