= Bycatch =

Fish or other marine species caught unintentionally

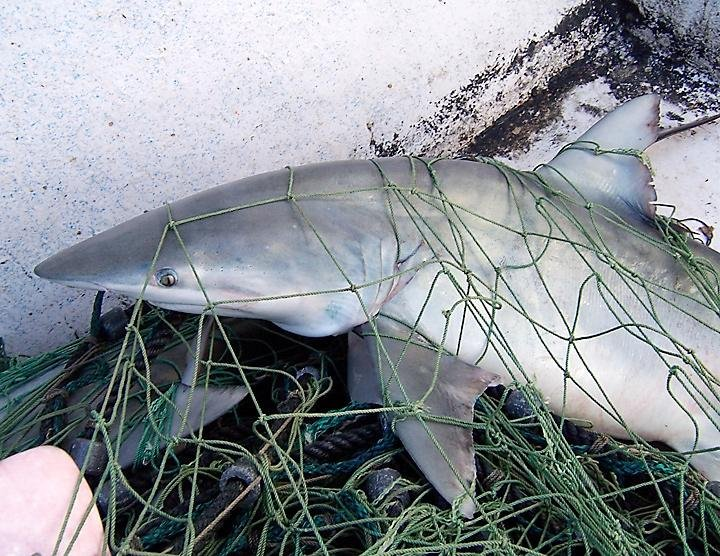
A finetooth shark (Carcharhinus isodon) caught as bycatch by a fishing vessel

Bycatch (or by-catch), in the fishing industry, is a fish or other marine species that is caught unintentionally while fishing for specific species or sizes of wildlife. Bycatch is either the wrong species, the wrong sex, or is undersized or juveniles of the target species. The term "bycatch" is also sometimes used for untargeted catch in other forms of animal harvesting or collecting. Non-marine species (freshwater fish not saltwater fish) that are caught (either intentionally or unintentionally) but regarded as generally "undesirable" are referred to as rough fish (mainly US) or coarse fish (mainly UK).

In 1997, the Organisation for Economic Co-operation and Development (OECD) defined bycatch as "total fishing mortality, excluding that accounted directly by the retained catch of target species". Bycatch contributes to fishery decline and is a mechanism of overfishing for unintentional catch.

The average annual bycatch rate of pinnipeds and cetaceans in the US from 1990 to 1999 was estimated at 6215 animals with a standard error of 448.

Bycatch issues originated with the "mortality of dolphins in tuna nets in the 1960s".

There are at least four different ways the word "bycatch" is used in fisheries:

- Catch which is retained and sold but which is not the target species for the fishery
- Species/sizes/sexes of fish which fishers discard (Note: A definition used particularly in the northeast and western Pacific and in US legislation)
- Non-target fish, whether retained and sold or discarded
- Unwanted invertebrate species, such as echinoderms and non-commercial crustaceans, and various vulnerable species groups, including seabirds, sea turtles, marine mammals and elasmobranchs (sharks and their relatives).

Additionally, the term "deliberate bycatch" is used to refer to bycatch as a source of illegal wildlife trade (IWT) in several areas throughout the world.

There are several tools to estimate bycatch limits—the maximum number of animals that could be sustainably removed from a population impacted by bycatch. These include the 'potential biological removal' (PBR) and the 'sustainable anthropogenic mortality in stochastic environments' (SAMSE), which incorporates stochastic factors to determine sustainable limits to bycatch and other human-caused mortality of wildlife.

== Activities that produce bycatch ==
=== Commercial fishing ===
Bycatch is inevitable wherever there is fishing. The incidental catch is not limited to only fish species: dolphins, sea turtles, and seabirds are also victims of bycatch.

Bycatch happens most commonly with the use of gillnetting, longlines, or bottom trawling. Longlines with bait hook attachments can potentially reach lengths of dozens of kilometres, and, along with gill nets in the water and bottom trawls sweeping the sea floor, can catch essentially everything in their path. There are thousands of kilometres of nets and lines cast into the world's oceans daily. This modern fish gear is robust and invisible to the eye, making it efficient at catching fish and bycatching everything that happens to be in the way.

Hook-and-line fishing could limit bycatch to a certain extent as the non-target animals can be released back to the ocean fairly quickly.

=== Recreational fishing ===
Given the popularity of recreational fishing throughout the world, a small local study in the US in 2013 suggested that discards may be an important unmonitored source of fish mortality.

=== Shrimp trawling ===
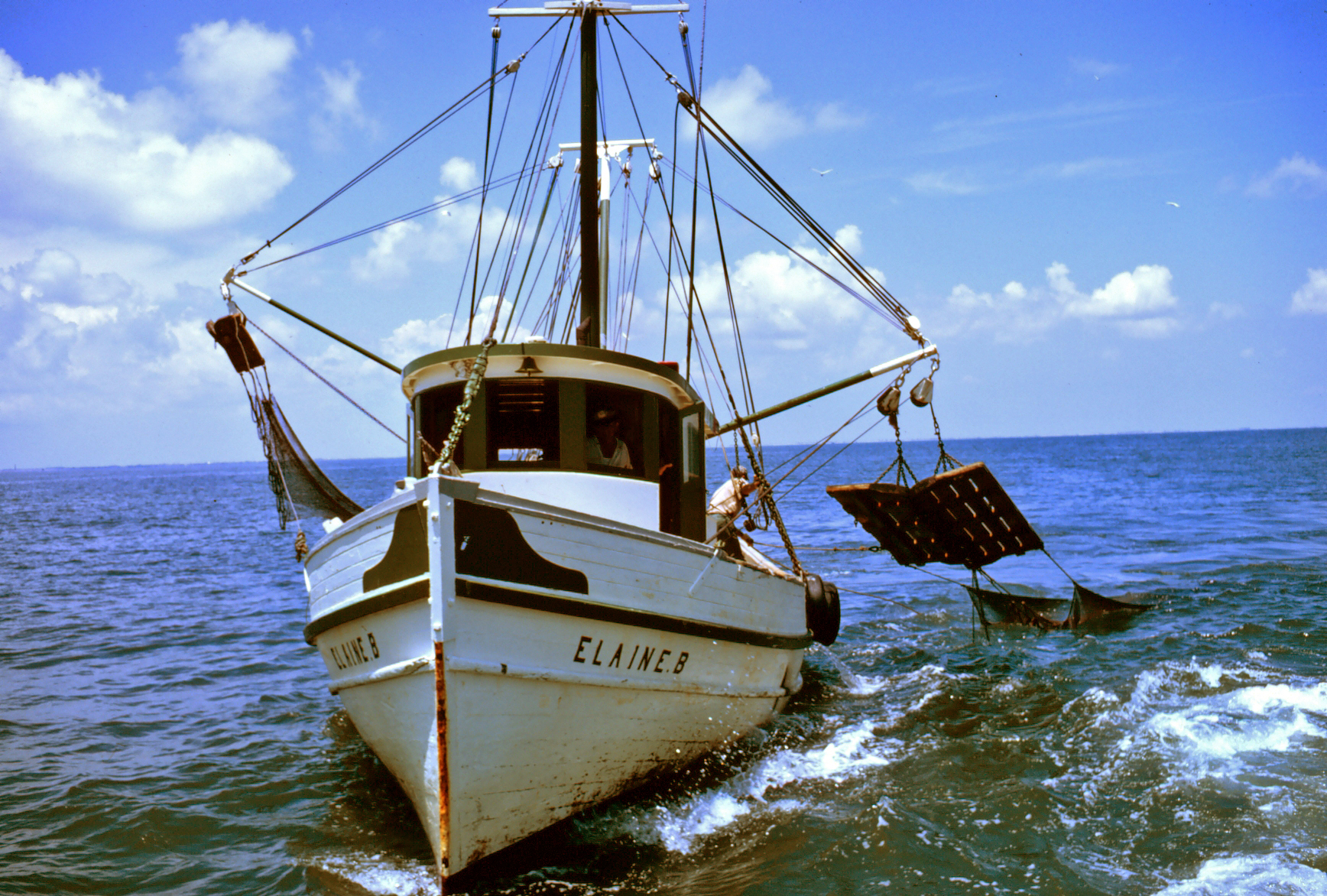
Double-rigged shrimp trawler hauling in nets

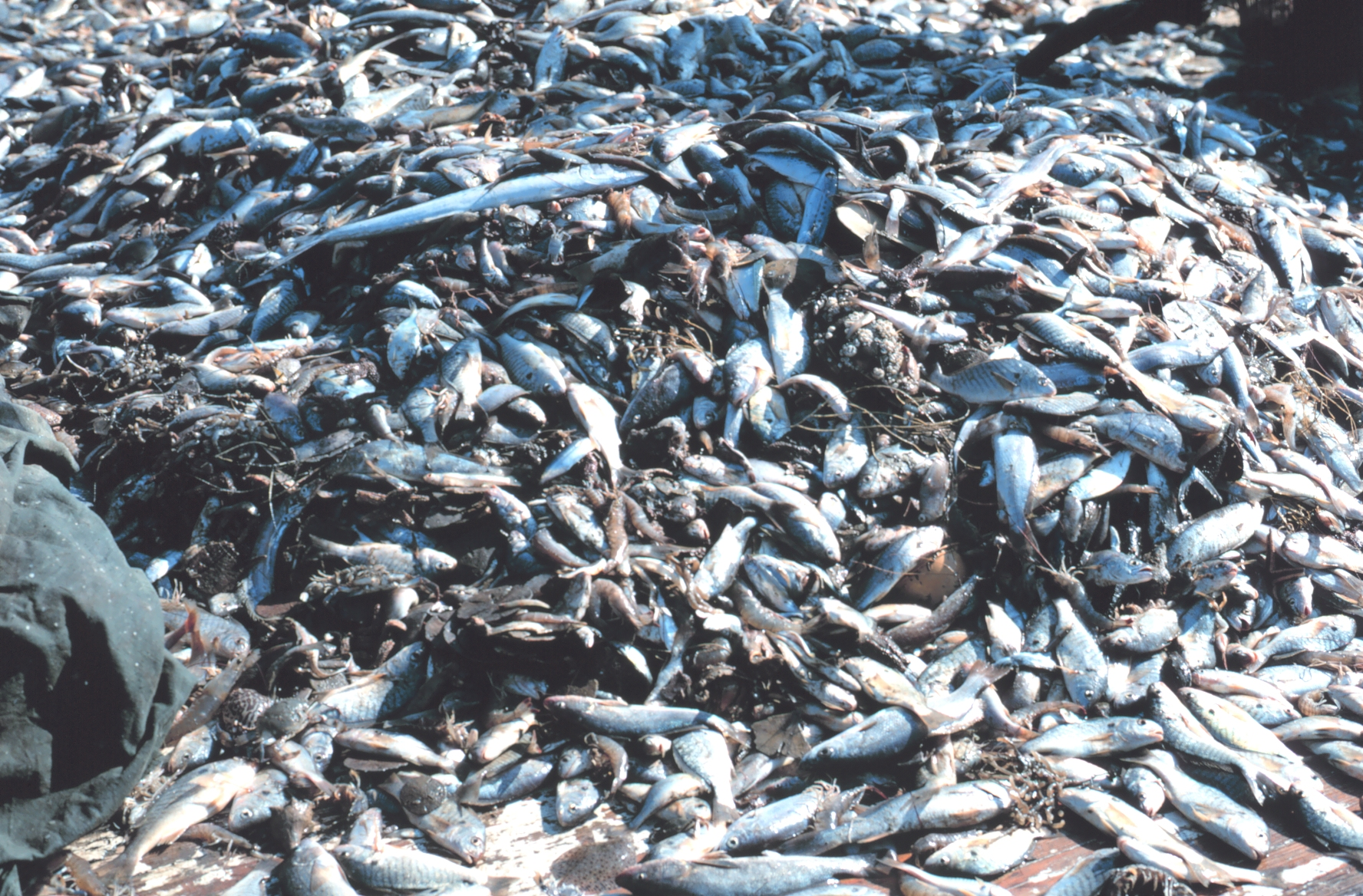
Shrimp bycatch

The highest rates of incidental catch of non-target species are associated with tropical shrimp trawling. In 1997, the Food and Agriculture Organization of the United Nations (FAO) documented the estimated bycatch and discard levels from shrimp fisheries around the world. They found discard rates (ratio of bycatch to catch by mass) as high as 20:1 with a world average of 5.7:1.

Shrimp trawl fisheries catch two percent of the world total catch of all fish by weight, but produce more than one-third of the world total bycatch. US shrimp trawlers produce bycatch ratios between 3:1 (3 bycatch:1 shrimp) and 15:1 (15 bycatch:1 shrimp).

Trawl nets in general, and shrimp trawls in particular, have been identified as sources of mortality for cetacean and finfish species. When bycatch is discarded (returned to the sea), it is often dead or dying.

Tropical shrimp trawlers often make trips of several months without coming to port. A typical haul may last four hours after which the net is pulled in. Just before it is pulled on board the net is washed by zigzagging at full speed. The contents are then dumped on deck and are sorted. An average of 5.7:1 means that for every kilogram of shrimp there are 5.7 kg of bycatch. In tropical inshore waters the bycatch usually consists of small fish. The shrimps are frozen and stored on board; the bycatch is discarded.

Recent sampling in the South Atlantic rock shrimp fishery found 166 species of finfish, 37 crustacean species, and 29 other species of invertebrate among the bycatch in the trawls. Another sampling of the same fishery over a two-year period found that rock shrimp amounted to only 10% of total catch weight. Iridescent swimming crab, dusky flounder, inshore lizardfish, spot, brown shrimp, longspine swimming crabs, and other bycatch made up the rest.

Despite the use of bycatch reduction devices, the shrimp fishery in the Gulf of Mexico removes about 25–45 million red snapper annually as bycatch, nearly one-half the amount taken in recreational and commercial snapper fisheries.

=== Non-fisheries bycatch ===
The term "bycatch" is used also in contexts other than fisheries. Examples are insect collecting with pitfall traps or flight interception traps for either financial, controlling or scientific purposes (where the bycatch may either be small vertebrates or untargeted insects) and control of introduced vertebrates which have become pest species like the muskrat in Europe (where the bycatch in traps may be European minks or waterfowl).

== Victims ==
=== Sharks and rays ===
Longlines, trawls and purse seine nets are driving factors in the endangerment of no fewer than fifteen shark species. Bycatch may also affect reproduction of populations as juveniles are also victims of bycatch.

The amount of time it takes for sharks to reach maturation, which is when they are able to reproduce, varies between species and sex. The Sphyrna mokarran, or Great Hammerhead, takes 15 years for the female to reach maturation, compared to only 6 years for the males. It is due to these long maturation periods, as well as slow birth rates, that bycatch has been a significant driver of shark population decline.

=== Cetacean ===
Group of Fraser's dolphins

Cetaceans, such as dolphins, porpoises, and whales, can be seriously affected by entanglement in fishing nets and lines, or direct capture by hooks or in trawl nets. Cetacean bycatch is increasing in intensity and frequency. In some fisheries, cetaceans are captured as bycatch but then retained because of their value as food or bait. In this fashion, cetaceans can become a target of fisheries.

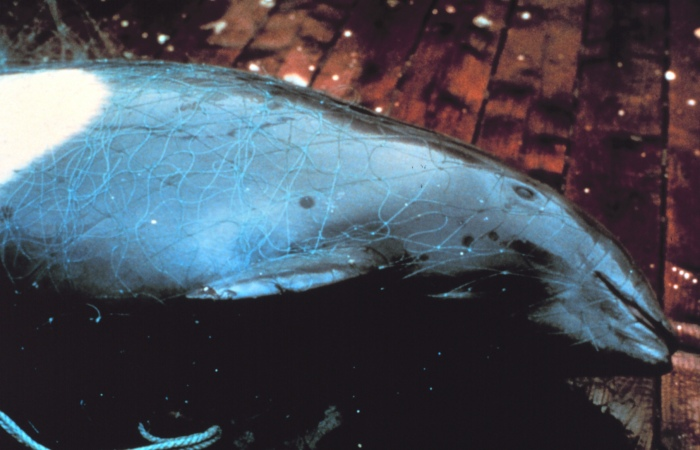
A Dall's porpoise caught in a fishing net

One example of bycatch is dolphins caught in tuna nets. As dolphins are mammals and do not have gills, they may drown while stuck in nets underwater. This bycatch issue has been one of the reasons of the growing ecolabelling industry, where fish producers mark their packagings with disclaimers such as "dolphin friendly" to reassure buyers. However, "dolphin friendly" does not mean that dolphins were not killed in the production of a particular tin of tuna, but that the fleet which caught the tuna did not specifically target a feeding pod of dolphins, but relied on other methods to spot tuna schools. The bycatch of the Caspian seal may be recognized as one of the biggest entanglements of pinnipeds as bycatch in the world

=== Albatross ===
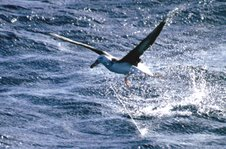
Black-browed albatross hooked on a long-line

Of the 22 albatross species recognised by IUCN on their Red List, 15 are threatened with extinction, six species are considered as Near Threatened, and only one of Least Concern. Two species, the Tristan albatross and the waved albatross, are considered as Critically Endangered. One of the main threats is commercial longline fishing, because albatrosses and other seabirds which readily feed on offal are attracted to the set bait, after which they become hooked on the lines and drown. An estimated 100,000 albatross per year are killed in this fashion. Unregulated pirate fisheries exacerbate the problem.

A research study examined the impact of illegal longline fishing vessels on albatrosses, by using environmental criminology as a guiding theoretical framework. The results indicated that potentially illegal longline fishing activities are highly concentrated in areas of illegally-caught fish species, and the risk to bycatch albatrosses is significantly higher in areas where these illegal longline fishing vessels operate. These findings provide strong grounding that illegal longline fishing poses a particularly serious threat to the survival of seabirds.

=== Sea turtles ===
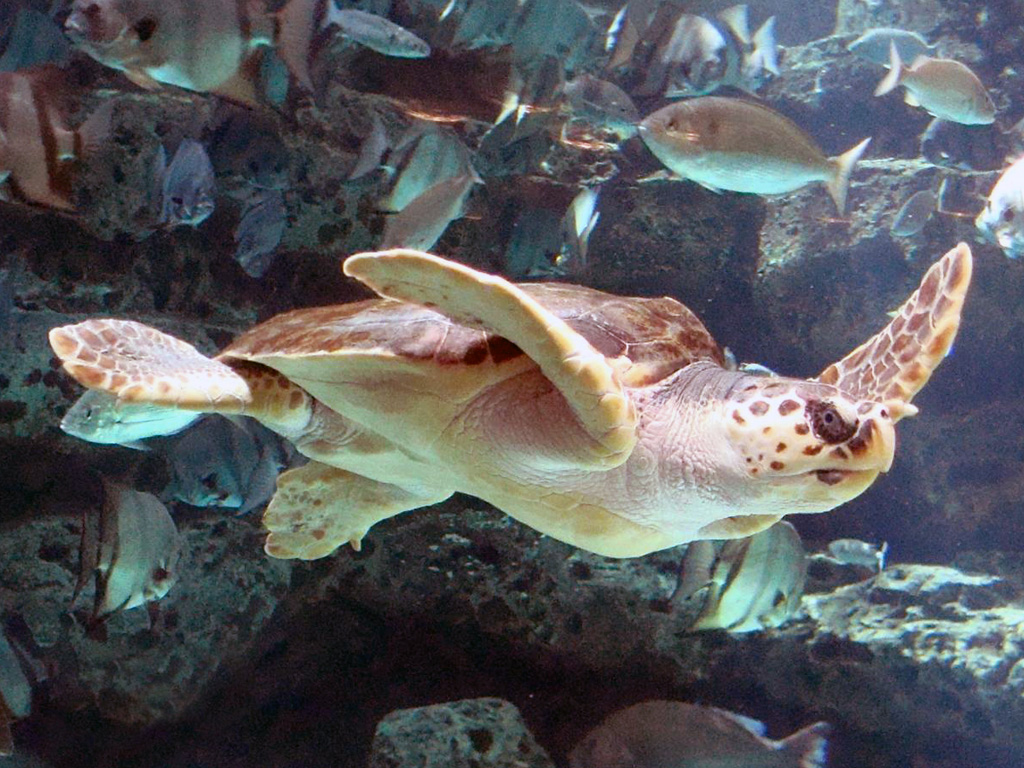
Loggerhead sea turtle

Sea turtles, already critically endangered, have been killed in large numbers in shrimp trawl nets. Estimates indicate that thousands of Kemp's ridley, loggerhead, green, and leatherback sea turtles are caught in shrimp trawl fisheries in the Gulf of Mexico and the US Atlantic annually The speed and length of the trawl method is significant because, "for a tow duration of less than 10 minutes, the mortality rate for sea turtles is less than one percent, whereas for tows greater than sixty minutes the mortality rate rapidly increases to fifty to one hundred percent".

Sea turtles can sometimes escape from the trawls. In the Gulf of Mexico, the Kemp's ridley turtles recorded most interactions, followed in order by loggerhead, green, and leatherback sea turtles. In the US Atlantic, the interactions were greatest for loggerheads, followed in order by Kemp's ridley, leatherback, and green sea turtles.

== Mitigation ==
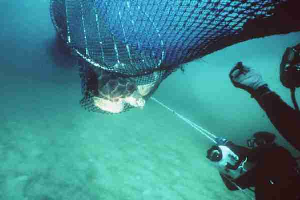
A turtle excluder device

Concern about bycatch has led fishers and scientists to seek ways of reducing unwanted catch. There are two main approaches.

One approach is to ban fishing in areas where bycatch is unacceptably high. Such area closures can be permanent, seasonal, or for a specific period when a bycatch problem is registered. Temporary area closures are common in some bottom trawl fisheries where undersized fish or non-target species are caught unpredictably. In some cases fishers are required to relocate when a bycatch problem occurs.

The other approach is alternative fishing gear. A technically simple solution is to use nets with a larger mesh size, allowing smaller species and smaller individuals to escape. However, this usually requires replacing the existing gear. In some cases, it is possible to modify gear. Bycatch reduction devices (BRDs) and the Nordmore grate are net modifications that help fish escape from shrimp nets.

=== Bycatch reduction devices ===
BRDs allow many commercial finfish species to escape. The US government has approved BRDs that reduce finfish bycatch by 30%. Spanish mackerel and weakfish bycatch in the South Atlantic was reduced by 40%. However, recent surveys suggest BRDs may be less effective than previously thought. A rock shrimp fishery off Florida found the devices failed to exclude 166 species of fish, 37 crustacean species, and 29 species of other invertebrates.

A pulsed electric field-based shark and ray bycatch mitigation device, SharkGuard, was reported by 2022 study to have reduced bycatch of blue shark by 91% and of stingrays by 71% with commercial fishing gear in a French longline tuna fishery in the Mediterranean.

=== Turtle excluder devices ===
In 1978, the National Marine Fisheries Service (NMFS) started to develop turtle excluder devices (TED). A TED uses a grid which deflects turtles and other big animals, so they exit from the trawl net through an opening above the grid. US shrimp trawlers and foreign fleets which market shrimp in the US are required to use TEDs. Not all nations enforce the use of TEDs.

For the most part, when they are used, TEDs have been successful reducing sea turtle bycatch. However, they are not completely effective, and some turtles are still captured. NMFS certifies TED designs if they are 97% effective. In heavily trawled areas, the same sea turtle may pass repeatedly through TEDs. Recent studies indicate recapture rates of 20% or more, but it is not clear how many turtles survive the escape process.

Within the United States, TEDs have been met with mixed reactions from shrimp fishers. Initial complaints cited the size of the TED made it cumbersome to handle, which in response a smaller one was designed. TEDs have been subject to many design changes since their introduction, and gear specialists at the National Oceanic and Atmospheric Administration (NOAA) take suggestions from fishers to continually improve the technology.

=== Conservation engineering of trawl nets ===
The size selectivity of trawl nets is controlled by the size of the net openings, especially in the "cod end". The larger the openings, the more easily small fish can escape. The development and testing of modifications to fishing gear to improve selectivity and decrease impact is called "conservation engineering".

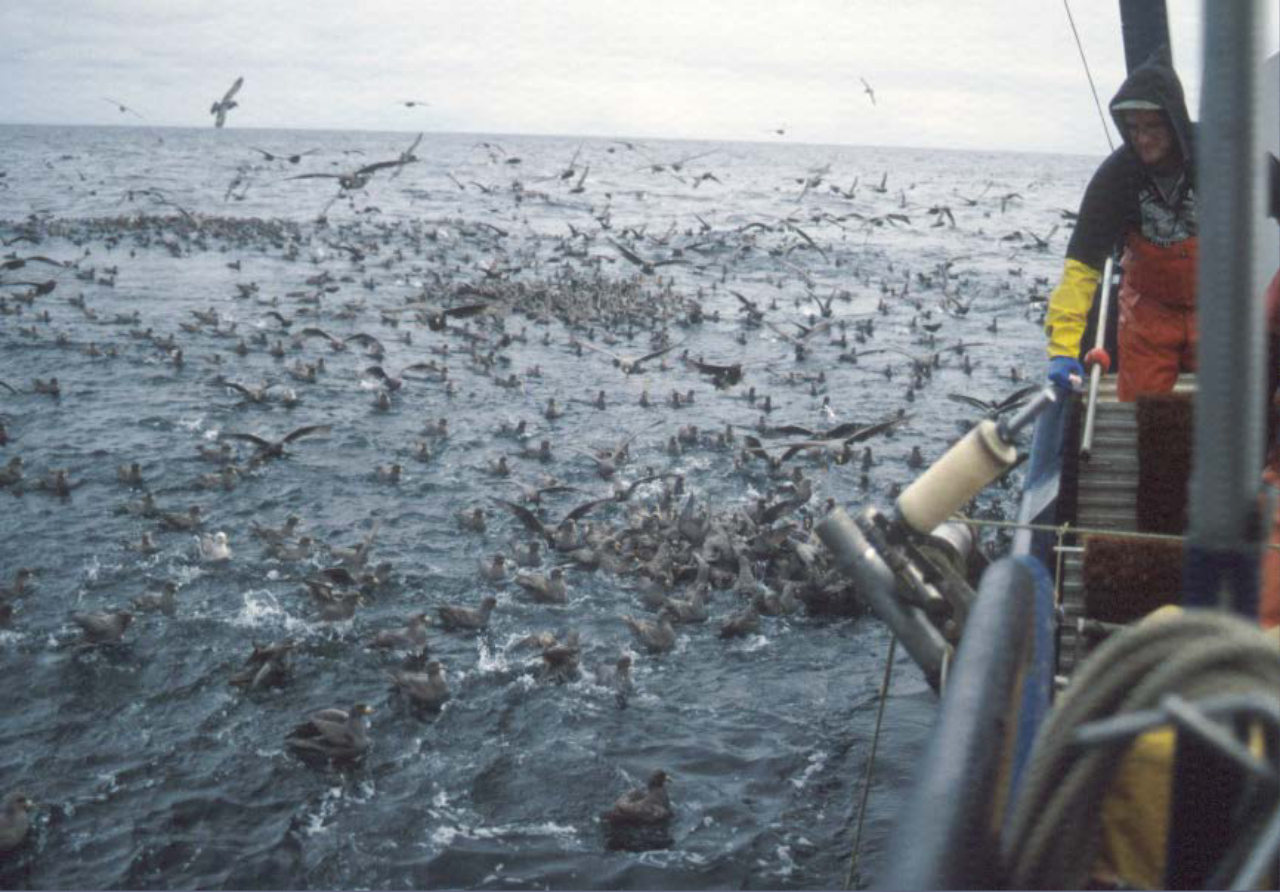
Seabirds chase longline fishing vessel

Longline fishing is controversial in some areas because of bycatch. Mitigation methods have been successfully implemented in some fisheries. These include:

- weights to sink the lines quickly
- streamer lines to scare birds away from baited hooks while deploying the lines
- setting lines only at night with minimal ship lighting (to avoid attracting birds)
- limiting fishing seasons to the southern winter (when most seabirds are not feeding young)
- not discharging offal while setting lines.

However, gear modifications do not eliminate bycatch of many species. In March 2006, the Hawaiʻi longline swordfish fishing season was closed due to excessive loggerhead sea turtle bycatch after being open only a few months, despite using modified circle hooks.

One of the mitigation methods is using streamer lines (in orange).

=== Seabirds ===
Seabirds get entangled in longlines by flocking around vessels, this eventually leads to drowning because they try to catch baits on the hooks. Fisheries had been using "streamer lines" as a cost effective solution to mitigate this type of bycatch, and it has dramatically reduced seabird mortality. These streamer lines have bright colors and are made of polyester rope, they are positioned alongside the longlines on both sides. Their bright colors and constantly flapping of water frightens the seabirds and they fly away before reaching the baited hooks. A successful example would be the use of streamer lines in Alaskan groundfish longline fisheries, as the deaths of seabirds declined by about 70% after the deployment of these lines.

== Retention ==
Some fisheries retain bycatch, rather than throwing the fish back into the ocean.

=== Commercialization of bycatch ===
Sometimes bycatch is sorted and sold as food, especially in Asia, Africa and Latin America, where labour is cheaper. Bycatch can also be sold in frozen bags as "assorted seafood" or "seafood medley" at cheaper prices. Bycatch can be converted into fish hydrolysate (ground up fish carcasses) for use as a soil amendment in organic agriculture or it can be used as an ingredient in fish meal. In Southeast Asia bycatch is sometimes used as a raw material for fish sauce production. Bycatch is also commonly de-boned, de-shelled, ground and blended into fish paste or moulded into fish cakes (surimi) and sold either fresh (for domestic use) or frozen (for export). This is commonly the case in Asia or by Asian fisheries. Sometimes bycatch is sold to fish farms to feed farmed fish, especially in Asia.

=== No discards policy ===
A 'no discards' policy has been adopted by Norway as a way to reduce bycatch. This means that the fishermen must keep everything they catch. This policy has helped to "encourage bycatch research", which, in turn has helped "encourage behavioral changes in fishers" and "reduce the waste of life" as well.

== See also ==
- Environmental stewardship
- Discards
- Cetacean bycatch
- List of environmental issues
- Shrimp turtle case
- Ghost net
