= Incidental catch =

Aspect of fishing

In fishing, incidental catch refers to the portion of the catch that was unintentionally caught but retained. It can be distinguished from discards, which are the unintended catch that is caught and then returned to the sea, and bycatch, which includes all non-targeted species caught alongside the targeted species.

Bycatch = Incidental catch + Discarded catch

The operational definitions used by the FAO for incidental catch and other related catches are as follows:

- Target catch: The catch of a species or species assemblage which is primarily sought in a fishery, such as shrimp, flounders, cods
- Incidental catch: Retained catch of non-targeted species
- Discarded catch (usually shortened to discards): That portion of the catch returned to the sea as a result of economic, legal, or personal considerations.
- Bycatch: Discarded catch plus incidental catch.
