= Shrimp-Turtle Case =

1994 WTO trade case

In 1994, the WTO intervened to address member concerns regarding the import of shrimp and its impact on turtles. This became known as the Shrimp and Turtle case. The ruling was adopted on November 6, 1998. However, Malaysia persisted in their complaint and initiated DSU Article 21.5 proceedings against the U.S. in 2001, but the U.S. prevailed in those hearings.

== Shrimp and Turtle case ==
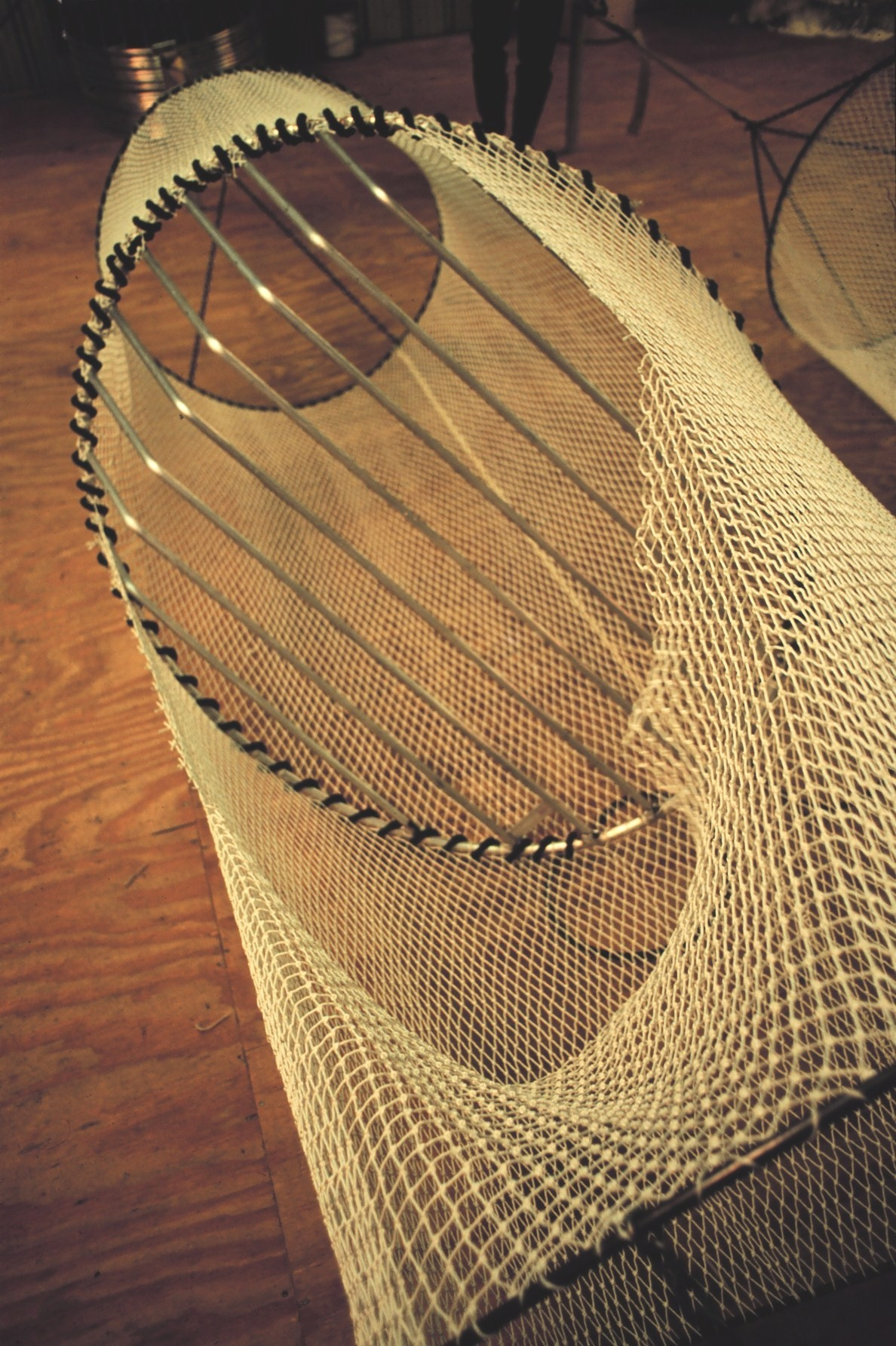
Turtle excluder devices are used by US fishermen to allow turtles to escape from their nets.

The environmental group from Oakland, California, Earthjustice sued the Environmental Protection Agency for a lack of oversight among US shrimp fishers and international fishermen.

The Earth Island Institute filed a lawsuit against US Secretary of State Warren Christopher in federal court. The government successfully argued that jurisdiction for anything dealing with embargoes was under the purview of the United States Court of International Trade. The suit was based on Public Law 609:101-162, which was not an amendment to the Endangered Species Act although it is often said to be. Public Law 609 required (a) the Secretary of State to negotiate and develop a bilateral treaty for the protection of endangered sea turtles, and (b) prohibited the importation of shrimp that was produced without Turtle Excluder Device technology introduced by the National Marine Fisheries Services. Previously, the U.S. had confined its enforcement of 609 to Caribbean countries instead of all countries. This is why the Court of International Trade ruled in favor of Earth Island Institute.

Sea turtles, endangered species on the Endangered Species Act (ESA) were caught as by-catch with shrimp. The US Environmental Protection Agency sought to protect endangered species. Presently, the NMFS requires US shrimp fishermen to use the technology while fishing for shrimp.

The new technology allowed the capture and harvest of shrimp without ensnaring sea turtles in the indiscriminatory bottom-trawling process. The patented trap door was very effective and the US fishermen quickly adopted the technology; however, implementation and adoption of the shrimp turtle trap door was limited at best among countries to comply.

Malaysia, India, Pakistan and Thailand jointly filed suit with the WTO in opposition to the requirement. Initially, the WTO ruled against the United States. According to the WTO, the United States could not discriminate between each country by providing the protesting countries with "financial and technical assistance," but not all countries. The US later amended the EPA. Unsatisfied, Malaysia continued to assert the United States banned the import of shrimp. After further review, a WTO compliance panel ruled in favor of the US in 2001. They stated the US was justified under GATT because the U.S. no longer discriminated in the application of their exception under Article XX(g).

This case is significant because the WTO permitted the U.S. to restrict an import based on its production process and not the product itself. A matter known as the process versus product issue.

== Dolphin Tuna case ==
Similar to the Shrimp and Turtle Case was Dolphin Tuna Case in the 1990s. Fishermen used a process called "setting on dolphins" to catch tuna. The tuna tended to swim underneath the dolphin, so fishermen threw nets over the dolphin to catch the tuna underneath. Dolphin often were trapped in the nets and drowned. Private companies introduced a "Dolphin Safe" label. Tuna sold to the US markets with this label had to comply with requirements determined by US regulations, the Dolphin Protection Consumer Information Act (DPCIA).

The United States lost the Tuna-Dolphin Case twice. The first was when Mexico opened a dispute (Tuna-Dolphin I), and the second was the European Economic Community and The Netherlands (Tuna-Dolphin II). The U.S. lost this case for two reasons: process versus product and extraterritoriality. The Panel Report indicated that the US could not distinguish between like products--in this case tuna--through procedure and process methods--in this case the use of purse-seine netting methods that drowned dolphins.

Following failed diplomatic efforts to water down the DPCIA, Mexico again brought a case before the WTO, the US-Tuna II case. After several appeals on both sides, the final report was issued in 2018, which concluded that the regulations underpinning the dolphin-safe labelling qualified as an exception under GATT XX(b) and XX(g), did not discriminate against Mexican tuna, and were calibrated appropriately based on disproportionate risks to dolphins from different fishing methods. The importance of the US-Tuna II case is that following the Shrimp-Turtle case, the WTO Appellate Body allowed the labelling system to distinguish between otherwise identical tuna based on procedure and process methods, which was not allowed under US-Tuna I. These two cases, Shrimp-Turtle and US-Tuna II, indicate that the WTO now prioritizes the protection of wildlife over the strict adherence to trade agreements.
