= Speciality goods =

Speciality goods are a class of consumer goods. Consumer goods can be categorized into convenience goods, shopping goods, and specialty goods. Under the yellow, red and orange goods three-part classification, specialty goods are "orange goods".

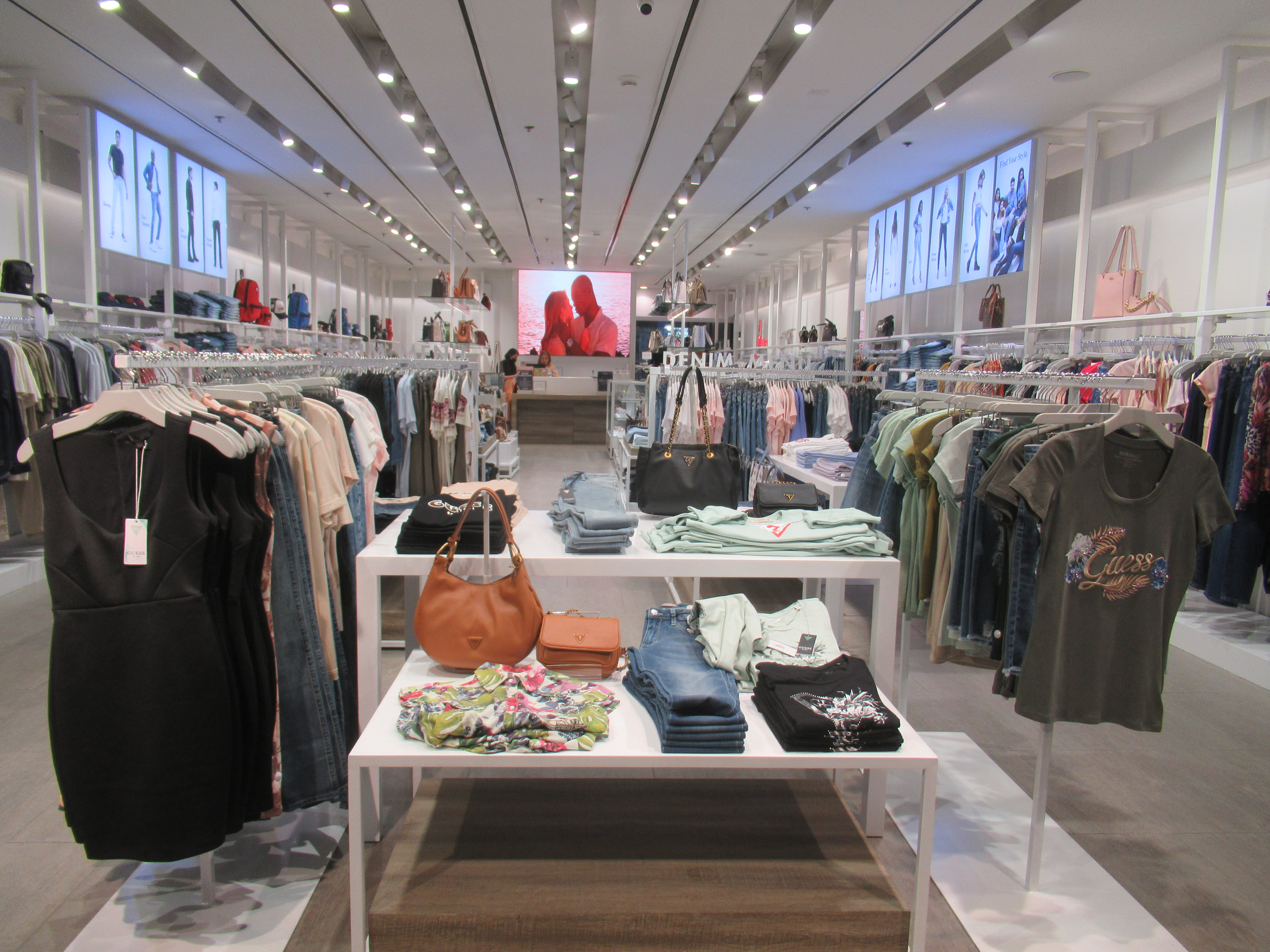
Clothing are an example of speciality goods. They are reasonably durable, but they still wear out periodically and need to be replaced.

Speciality goods are moderately durable goods that wear out with regular use and have to be replaced, such as clothing. These goods are unique, so consumers need to make more effort to acquire these items; as such exclusive distributor arrangements and franchises are often used to sell them.

== Classification ==
The classification scheme is based on the way consumers purchase. This system is based on the definition that convenience and speciality goods are both purchased with a predetermined pattern in mind. In the case of the convenience good, the pattern is that the most accessible brand will be purchased; in the case of a speciality good, the pattern is that only a specific brand will be purchased.

For example, if the customer utilizes an outlet because it is the most accessible, it would be considered, for that customer at least, a convenience store; while one in which the consumer shops even if he has to go considerably out of his way to reach it, would be considered a speciality store.

A shopping good is one in which the consumer does not have a predetermined pattern in mind. Likewise, a shopping store is one which the consumer will undertake a search to select a store to patronize.

== Buying behavior ==
Brands of high consumer loyalty are less likely to lose sales because they are not in many outlets. A speciality good choice is made by the buyer with respect to its value of the product in his life. When a certain decision has been made, he is unlikely to change the loyalty associated with the product to some other brand. At that moment, the consumer does not worry about the availability of that product in his area of convenience.
