= Mammals and birds excluder device =

A mammals and birds excluder device (MBED), also named cachalotera, is a device added to fishing gear that avoids the killing of marine mammals and seabirds during commercial fishing. This device was designed mainly for the interactions with toothed whales: sperm and killer whales.

== Mechanism ==
The mammals and birds excluder device consists in a modification to the traditional Spanish bottom longline used in the fishery of Patagonian toothfish (Dissostichus eleginoides). Several configurations are in use depending on the country and fishermen. The first descriptions were issued in Chile and Uruguay, starting the tests in 2006.

The main bottom longline is set in a simple way with a main line rigging from which many secondary or branch lines are hanging, of about 12 to 15 m long. On each of these lines, a cone-shaped device or protection net is placed in each secondary line, made by two metallic rings on the edge covered by a mesh net: the upper ring of 20 cm of diameter consisting in encased wire ending in retention rigging; and a lower ring of 100 cm diameter, with a separation distance between both rings of 180 cm. The mesh net composing the device is 7.5 cm, and on the upper ring, it ends in a knot allowing movement through the branch lines. Such branch lines are separated from 55 m to 70 m between them, and may be set in variable styles according to the hauling speed. One set contains 6 hooks, and such sets are prepared on the basis of 4 per box. This device as a whole has less density than the end weights (5 to 10 kg) and consequently, it rises up to the retention when hauling, and the hooks are uncovered when it reaches the bottom. When the longline is hauled back, the cone-shaped device is moved to the lower part of the branch lines, covering the hooks and consequently protecting the catch. The hooks are rigged in a piece divided into two bunches of 6 hooks each, being the main piece of 170 cm long and a diameter of 6 mm, and the two bunches are separated at 50 cm one from the other, the secondary lines (12 per piece) are 30 cm long and made of 4 mm diameter multifilament lines.

== History ==
First tests were carried out in 2006 in Chile and Uruguay in the longline fishery of toothfish (D. eleginoides) in the case of Uruguay the main assessment were carried out in the FV Banzare operating in two fishing areas at 40° and 50° latitudes in the southwestern Atlantic from March to May 2007. The development of this fishing gear was monitored by fisheries observers on board in all the cases

== Achievements ==
In all the cases, the incidental capture of birds registered was absolute: no bird was captured when the MBED was used on the fishing gear, no marine bird mortalities were due to gear captures during this study. The MBED works in two aspects:

- 1) the weight attached gives a superior sinking rate,
- 2) the mesh sleeve that surrounds the captured piece, avoids the access from mammals and marine birds to the fish or the hooks during the hauling of the gear. While using the MBED, with the weight average of 8.5 kg and approximately 40 meters distance between the next, the overall average sinking rate of the longline gear was 1.03 m/s (Uruguayan tests FV Banzare), this rate is markedly superior to the 0.3 m/s demanded by the CCAMLR Conservation Measure 24-02 (2004).

== See also ==
- Turtle excluder device

== Bibliography ==
- Purves, M.G; Rojas, E. Trends in Sperm Whale Depredation and Mitigation Measures in the Southern Ocean. Presented to the International Sperm Whale Workshop: Sperm Whales and Ecosystems: Past, Present and Future.17th Biennial Conference on the Biology of Marine Mammals. Cape Town. 2007
