= Elprice =

Norwegian electronics retailer

- Industry: Retail
- Founded: 2000
- Headquarters: Bergen, Norway
- Products: White goods, brown goods, telecommunications, information technology
- Revenue: c. 1 billion kr (2009)
- Website: www.elprice.no

Elprice was an electronics retailer in Norway, which is now bankrupt.

Elprice was founded in 2000, and had its headquarters in Bergen. In 2008 it was merged with the Internet store Deal, as Deal's owner Holta Invest bought 98% of the shares. As of 2010, Elprice had 24 stores in Norway, in addition to an Internet store, Elprice.no.
