= Unsought goods =

Unsought goods are goods that the consumer does not know about or does not normally think of buying, and the purchase of which arises due to danger or the fear of danger and lack of desire.

The classic examples of known but unsought goods are funeral services, encyclopedias, fire extinguishers and blood donations. In some cases even an airplane or helicopter can be cited as examples of unsought goods. The purchase of these goods may not be immediate and can be deferred. Hence, unsought goods require advertising and personal-selling support.

Marketers classify products by their durability, tangibility, and target user (consumer or industrial). Unsought goods is a specific category of consumer product.

== Converting unsought goods to sought goods ==
New products such as frozen food items were unsought till they are advertised using media vehicles or by word of mouth marketing. Once the consumer is well educated about the product, the good goes on to become a sought good. For example: A new smartphone with exclusive features is an unsought good until the consumer hears about it. Once the smartphone is widely known among customers, it becomes a sought good. A classic example here is the Apple iPhone. Consumers are unaware that they want it unless told about it.

Life insurance is an example of an unsought good, though it is growing into a sought good as it shifts from pure insurance to what some perceive as an investment opportunity.
