= Yellow goods (construction and agriculture) =

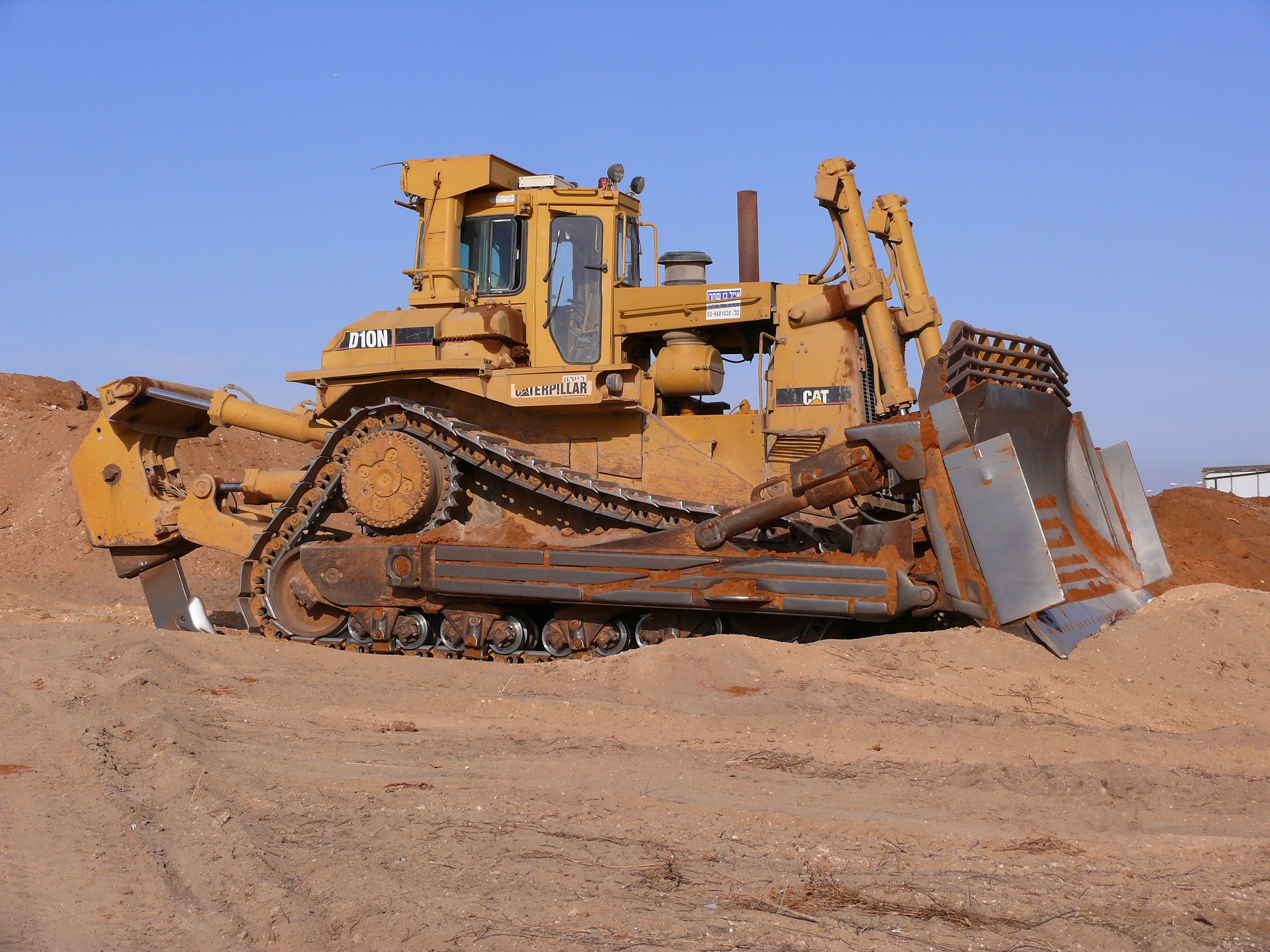
Bulldozers are a type of yellow good.

Yellow goods are material for construction and earth-moving equipment, quarrying equipment, and fork-lift trucks. The term is also used to encompass agricultural equipment, such as tractors. The term "yellow goods" originated from the distinctive yellow colour commonly used on these types of machinery.

== Construction and earth-moving equipment ==
These yellow goods machines include excavators, bulldozers, backhoes, loaders, and dump trucks. They are used in construction projects and designed to handle heavy loads, operate in rugged terrain, and perform tasks like digging, grading, and hauling. Manufacturers include Case, Caterpillar, Fiat, Komatsu, Liebherr and Shantui.

== Quarrying equipment ==
This equipment is designed for use in the quarrying industry, which involves the extraction of minerals and other materials from the earth. Common types of quarrying yellow goods include rock drills and stone crushers. These machines are used to extract materials like limestone, granite, and sand.

== Fork-lift trucks ==
Fork-lift trucks are also considered yellow goods. They are mostly used in warehousing and manufacturing. They are designed to lift and move heavy loads and are used for material handling and logistics operations.

== Agricultural equipment ==
Agricultural yellow goods such as tractors are used in the cultivation and harvesting of crops in the farming industry. They are designed to handle a variety of tasks, from tilling and planting to harvesting and transporting.

== See also ==
- White goods
- Brown goods
