= Turtle excluder device =

Device for freeing sea turtles from bycatch

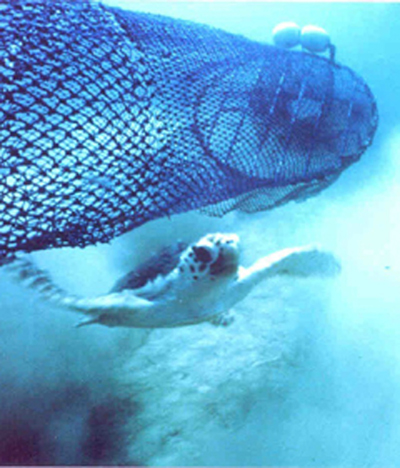
Sea turtle escaping a shrimp net through a turtle excluder device

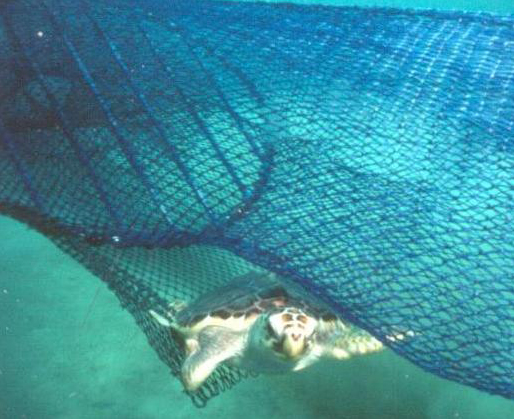
Loggerhead turtle exits a fishing net through a TED

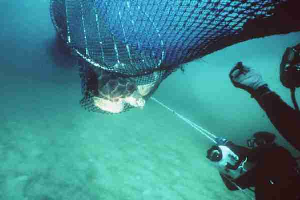
Loggerhead sea turtle escapes through the excluder device

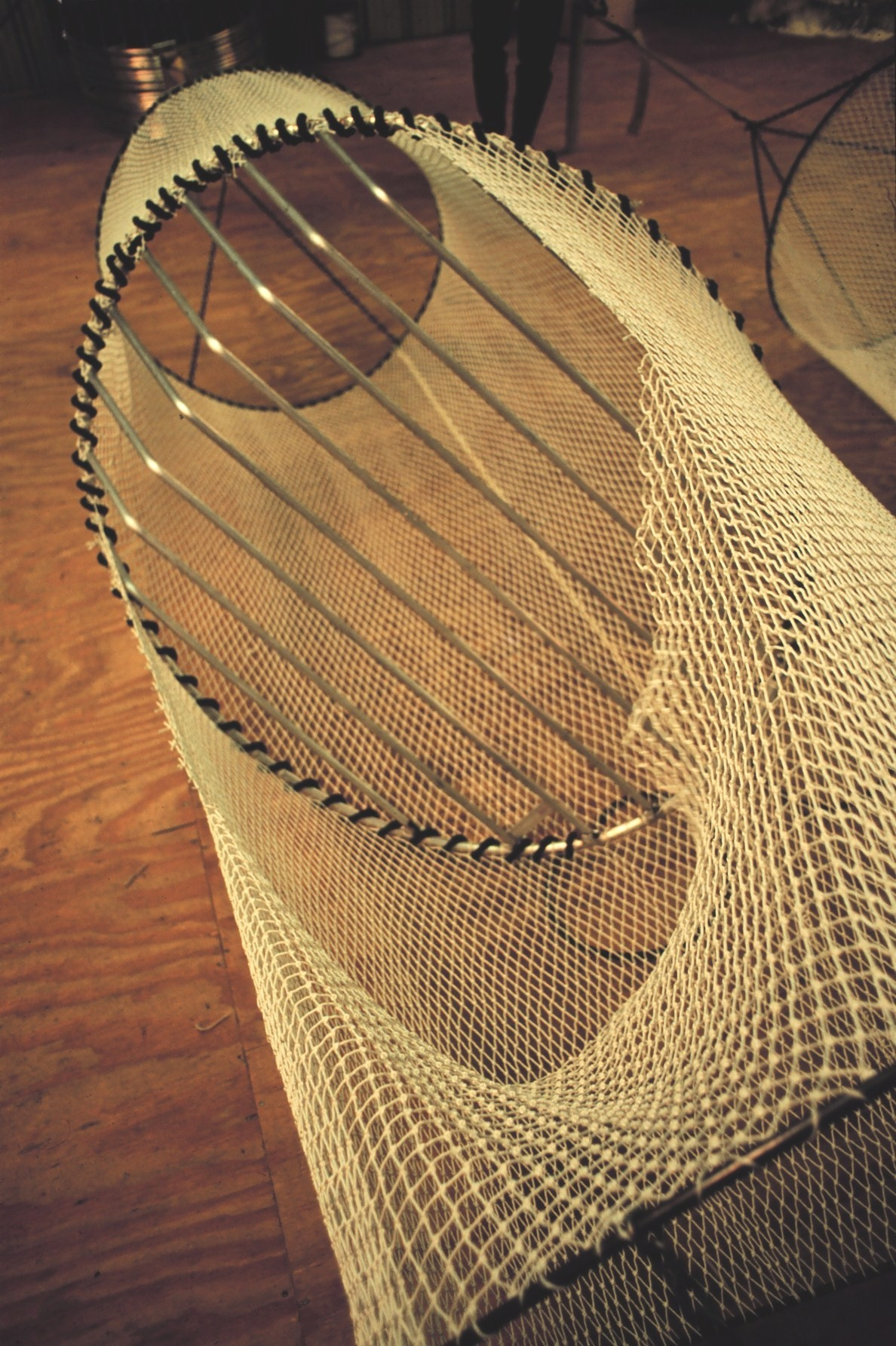
An example of a commercial turtle excluder device

A turtle excluder device (TED) is a specialized device that allows a captured sea turtle to escape when caught in a fisherman's net.

In particular, sea turtles can be caught when bottom trawling is used by the commercial shrimp fishing industry. In order to catch shrimp, a fine meshed trawl net is needed. This results in large amounts of other marine organisms being also caught as bycatch. When a turtle gets caught or entangled in a trawl net, it becomes trapped and is unable to return to the surface. Since sea turtles are air-breathing animals with lungs, they cannot survive long underwater without surfacing and will eventually drown.

== History ==
The first TED was based on a device called the jellyball shooter, which is used to prevent fouling by cannonball jellyfish (Stomolophus meleagris) in shrimp trawls. TEDs were later developed in the 1970s by Wil Seidel, who worked for NOAA. Some resistance to the use of TEDs has arisen from the belief that the use of the devices actually causes fishermen to lose shrimp and other targeted species.

In 1987, the United States required all shrimp trawlers to equip their nets with turtle excluder devices. Two years later the shrimp-turtle law was implemented. This required all countries that export shrimp to the US to certify that the shrimp they shipped were harvested by boats equipped with TEDs. Countries that cannot guarantee the use of the escape devices were banned from exporting shrimp to the US.

In 1996, the government of India proposed legislation for the requirement of modified "indigenous" TEDs, which they called TSDs (turtle saving devices), to be used by local fishermen. This was a response to the declining olive ridley population that were nesting in beaches such as in Odisha. The modified TSDs were similar to standard TEDs except for having fewer bars. This resulted in the increase of the distance between each pair of bars to ensure that bigger specimens of shrimp and fish were able to pass through the TSD and into the net.

== Mechanism ==
The use of the devices ideally allow all bycatch larger than ten centimeters (10 cm) to escape the nets unharmed. This selectivity is achieved by metal grids integrated into the trawl net structure. The grids act as a barrier for keeping large creatures such as turtles from passing through the bars into the back of the net.

A small opening in the net is then available either above or below the grid so that the creatures that are stopped by the TEDs are allowed to escape the net, relatively unharmed. Targeted species such as shrimp however, are pushed to the back of the net. The target design effectiveness of TEDs is 97%, but the field effectiveness is often far lower. Seagrasses and other debris reduce fishing effectiveness of TEDs and in some situations may block sea turtles from exiting the net. In addition, it is easy to tamper with TEDs so as to increase the fishing efficiency of the net, while eliminating the turtle-excluding properties of the TED.

== Failings and drawbacks ==
While turtle excluder devices have been somewhat successful in lessening sea turtle casualties as by-catch, they still have a few failings and drawbacks.

It has been acknowledged that the larger sea turtles, primarily large loggerheads and leatherbacks, are too large to fit through the escape hatches installed in most TEDs. These turtles remain trapped within the net and perish. U.S. legislation introduced in 2003 attempted to address this issue by increasing the size of the escape chutes in the devices.

It is difficult to enforce TED compliance as TEDs can reduce the efficiency of the net system, resulting in a loss of some of the catch. On a per boat basis, turtles are rarely caught; in one study, only one turtle was caught per 322.5 hours in the Gulf of Mexico. This creates an incentive for the trawler to cheat. The catch loss can be eliminated by simply tying the turtle escape opening shut with a tie. The tie is removed when the vessel returns to port, thus avoiding detection by enforcement officers, but placing turtles at risk while trawling. It has been theorized that the spike in dead turtles seen in the Gulf of Mexico in June and July 2010 was due to shrimp boats that were taking advantage of lax marine enforcement due to the gulf oil spill.

Occasionally TED use becomes impractical due to debris in the water. When a TED is clogged with debris, it can no longer catch fish effectively or exclude turtles. For example, in September 2008 following Hurricanes Gustav and Ike, the National Marine Fisheries Service (NMFS) allowed temporary use of "Tow Times" in lieu of TEDs. Vessels were required to limit their tows to 55 minutes from the time the trawl doors entered the water until they were retrieved from the water. In June 2010 the limit was further reduced to 30 minutes. However, vessels were not equipped with tow time data loggers, so there was no practical method to enforce these time limits.

== The TTED ==
The TTED (trash and turtle excluder device) is a refinement of the TED, which, as well as turtles, can additionally free other forms of bycatch; "trash" refers to these other species. The TTED reduces sorting time and risks of injury due to sharks and rays being caught, improves the quality of shrimps, which are less likely to be crushed in the bottom of the trawl, and may also lead to a reduction in the amount of fuel consumed by the boats.

The TTED is the culmination of years of research. With funding provided by the European Union and the DIREN (Regional Environmental Authorities), WWF commissioned a study from IFREMER (French Research Institute for Exploitation of the Sea) to determine which selective gear was the most adapted to fishing conditions in French Guiana. These initial trials, conducted under experimental conditions, were carried out on board a shrimp trawler. Following this work, shrimp industry's members expressed the need to continue these experiments and to become more involved in the project. In response, WWF and the CRPMEMG (French Guiana Regional Fishery and Ocean Farming Committee) began working in close collaboration in order to test and develop the best gear for the French Guiana fleet.

With technical support from NOAA and IFREMER, the CRPMEMG carried out numerous at sea trials in close collaboration with French Guiana fleets. Specific parameters were tested, such as the shape and spacing between the bars of the selective grid. These trials allowed the fleets and the crews on board the shrimp trawlers to understand the advantages of more selective fishing gear and the benefits of using it in French Guiana. Based on the results and the captains' recommendations, the CRPMEMG decided to make the use of this TTED system mandatory by January 2010, when the annual fishing licences are issued. Many Captains were already using the TTED device on their shrimp trawlers well before January 2010.

The TTED was developed by the CRPMEMG and fishermen with the assistance of NOAA, IFREMER, the French Ministry of Agriculture and Fisheries, French Guiana, the European Fund for Fisheries (FEP) and the WWF.

== See also ==
- Mammals and birds excluder device

== Other references ==
- "Turtle Excluder Devices (TEDs)". Fisheries: Office of Protected Resources. U. S. National Oceanographic Atmospheric Administration. 2007.
