= Discards =

Catches in wild fisheries that are returned to the sea for any reason

Discards are the portion of a catch of fish which is not retained on board during commercial fishing operations and is returned, often dead or dying, to the sea. The practice of discarding is driven by economic and political factors; fish which are discarded are often unmarketable species, individuals which are below minimum landing sizes and catches of species which fishers are not allowed to land, for instance due to quota restrictions. Discards form part of the bycatch of a fishing operation, although bycatch includes marketable species caught unintentionally. Discards may also be caused by high grading, where marketable fish are discarded to make room for more valuable catches. Discarding can be highly variable in time and space as a consequence of changing economic, sociological, environmental and biological factors.

Discarding patterns are influenced by catch compositions, which in turn are determined by environmental factors, such as recruitment of small fish into the fishery, and social factors, such as quota regulation, choice of fishing gear and fishers' behaviour. There have been numerous studies on the scale of discarding. In the North Sea the total annual quantity of discards has been estimated at 800,000–950,000 tonnes, or the equivalent of one-third of the total weight landed annually and one-tenth of the estimated total biomass of fish in the North Sea.

== Impacts ==
Discarding affects the environment in two ways; firstly, through increased mortality to target and non-target species, particularly at juvenile life-history stages, and secondly, through alteration of food webs by supplying increased levels of food to scavenging organisms on the sea floor, and to seabirds. The survival of discarded fish and invertebrates is variable and depends on species and fishing gear used. For example, species such as the Pacific halibut caught in longline fisheries in the Bering Sea, or lesser-spotted dogfish in beam trawls in the English Channel have survival rates of between 88 and 98 per cent. Survival rates of roundfish discards are significantly lower, and this mortality is included in most International Council for the Exploration of the Sea stock assessments. Crustaceans are thought to be more hardy, though survival of crustaceans is variable; for instance, a survival rate of 25 per cent is assumed for the Norway lobster, whilst survival rates of almost 100 per cent have been demonstrated for the hermit crab, Pagurus bernhardus.

== Discard policies ==
The idea of banning discards is that since the fish that are discarded have a negligible chance of survival, it is better from a management perspective that they are included in the fishing induced mortality figures on which allowable catch estimates are based.

=== Norway ===
The Norwegian Government introduced a ban on the discarding of some commercial species of fish in 1987. The initiative in Norway has been coupled with a comprehensive programme of monitoring and surveillance and a system whereby areas can be opened and closed when bycatch rates become excessive. The Norwegian system of attempting to reduce mortality of illegal fish is based on reducing their capture rather than reducing landing of "illegal" specimens.

There has been no monitoring of the discard ban to evaluate its effectiveness, but retrospective studies have indirectly quantified the success of the ban through improvements in stock status and economic performance of fish stocks managed in Norwegian waters.

=== Canada ===
Canada has also instituted a ban on discarding at sea in its Atlantic groundfish fishery that makes it illegal to return to the water any groundfish except those specifically authorised and those caught in cod traps. Authorised release is only considered for species that are known to have high survival rates on release, or where there is no practical or nutritional use for a particular species. In addition to the banning of discards, larger vessels are required to carry observers, which would imply that there are now no illegal discards on these vessels.

=== Iceland ===
The introduction by the Icelandic Government of an individual transferable quota (ITQ) system of fisheries management across virtually all its major fisheries was followed by the introduction of a ban of at-sea discarding of catch. The Icelandic regulations require the retention of most fish for which quotas have been set or species for which a market exists. Since it is compulsory to land smaller fish, but the government does not wish to encourage their capture, there are upper limits on the percentage weight of fish that can be landed below minimum landing size. Both Greenland and the Faroe Islands have introduced similar regulations.

=== New Zealand ===
The quota management system in place in New Zealand makes the discarding of most species of fish illegal. The ITQ system in New Zealand is a complex system, and when fish are landed by a fisher without quota for a particular species, they have the option to buy quota from another fisher, or the value of the overrun catch be surrendered to the state. In many cases the fishers find it easier to discard the fish at sea than go through the complex system of landing the fish and then making it legal. There was a measurable increase in discarding immediately following the introduction of the ITQ system, despite the fact that fishers were offered 10 per cent of the market price for fish landed outside quota. In an attempt to address this change, the New Zealand Government increased the percentage of market price paid to 50 per cent. The balance between offering an incentive to land discarded fish and the disincentive to catch fish over or outside quota limits is clearly a fine one, and dependent on the financial reward or penalty attached.

=== European Union ===
EU legislation currently states that there are total allowable catches for each species, which are sub-divided between European Union member states, the intention of which is to conserve fish stocks. The individual countries then use this figure as a basis for quota allocation to individual fishers or fishers organisations. The quota rules however require that any fish which is caught outside quota allowances or below minimum landing size be discarded and that it is an offence for a fishing vessel to be carrying on board any fish for which it does not have a valid quota or which is outside regulated size limits. This is an example of discarding practice being driven by political considerations. Years after difficult negotiations between stakeholders and member states, the EU updated the Common Fisheries Policy and included in Article 15 the Landing Obligation (Discard ban). Until 2019 the law will be implemented progressively. The Landing Obligation does not allow the fisher to land bycatches, it is the obligation to do so. All species subject to a regulation, like catch quotas or minimum sizes, have to be landed. However, these landings are not feasible for direct human consumption and are therefore expected to be used in the fish meal industry. The reform of the Common Fisheries Policy is based on regulation formats in Norway and Iceland.

Hugh Fearnley-Whittingstall, a celebrity chef, led a campaign against this with a TV show called Hugh's Fish Fight, which successfully lobbied for a change in EU law to reduce the discards from thrown back fish in sea fishery.

== See also ==
- Bycatch
- High grading
