= Back-story (production) =

Tabasco-Cayanne Pepper Sauce backstory. (Example)

Back-story, in the production of consumer goods, is information about the effects of their production.

As of June 2007 sustainability advocates had begun evoking literary backstories to refer to the "backstories" of goods: that is, the impacts on the planet and people, caused by producing and delivering those goods. Without knowledge of the full backstory of a product, a consumer cannot accurately judge whether the impacts of purchasing it are good or bad. Some environmentalists and consumer-protection advocates argue that greater corporate and governmental transparency would be a critical step towards sustainability, enabling consumers to make more informed choices, and activists to bring public opinion to bear on practices they consider unethical.

== See also ==
- Supply Chain
