= Product/process distinction =

The product/process distinction is the distinction between the product information and the process information of a consumer good. Product information is information that pertains to a consumer good, namely to its price, quality, and safety (its proximate attributes). Process information is information that pertains to the means by which the consumer good is made i.e. the working conditions under which it comes into being, as well as the treatment of animals involved in its production chain (its peripheral attributes).

The product/process distinction is used by the World Trade Organization (WTO) as a way to determine whether or not a complaint filed by an importing nation is valid and warrants trade barriers against the exporting nation. Under WTO rules, an importing nation can lodge a complaint with the WTO that the exporting nation uses methods for obtaining or producing the good in question that the importing nation finds to be immoral or unethical. If the independent World Trade Organization Advisory Board, made up of a panel of international law and trade experts, finds that the importing nation has a legitimate complaint, enforces said ethical standards for domestic production, and isn't trying to merely skirt its free trade obligations, then the Board will rule that trade barriers are justified. Despite what World Trade Organization officials have said, in practice the World Trade Organization finds these complaints illegitimate the vast majority of the time.

For example, if the European Union (EU) wants to ban imports of cosmetics that were tested on laboratory animals on grounds that such testing is unethical, it can file a complaint with the World Trade Organization and, in theory, the WTO would allow the EU to enact trade barriers provided that the EU bans its own domestic cosmetic producers from testing on laboratory animals. In these cases, however, the World Trade Organization has consistently ruled that such barriers are illegal because only the process is different, while the final product itself is not. Therefore, the WTO has made the product/process distinction an important factor in determining whether trade barriers are justified.

The World Trade Organization has stated that if nations were able to enact barriers merely because the importing nation's standards differ from their own, control could be lost and barriers could be enacted around the world for frivolous reasons. However, many complain that these rulings go against the stated intentions of the World Trade Organization, and prove that the organization often puts commercial interests above environmental, ethical, and human rights issues.
