= Fishery Survey of India =

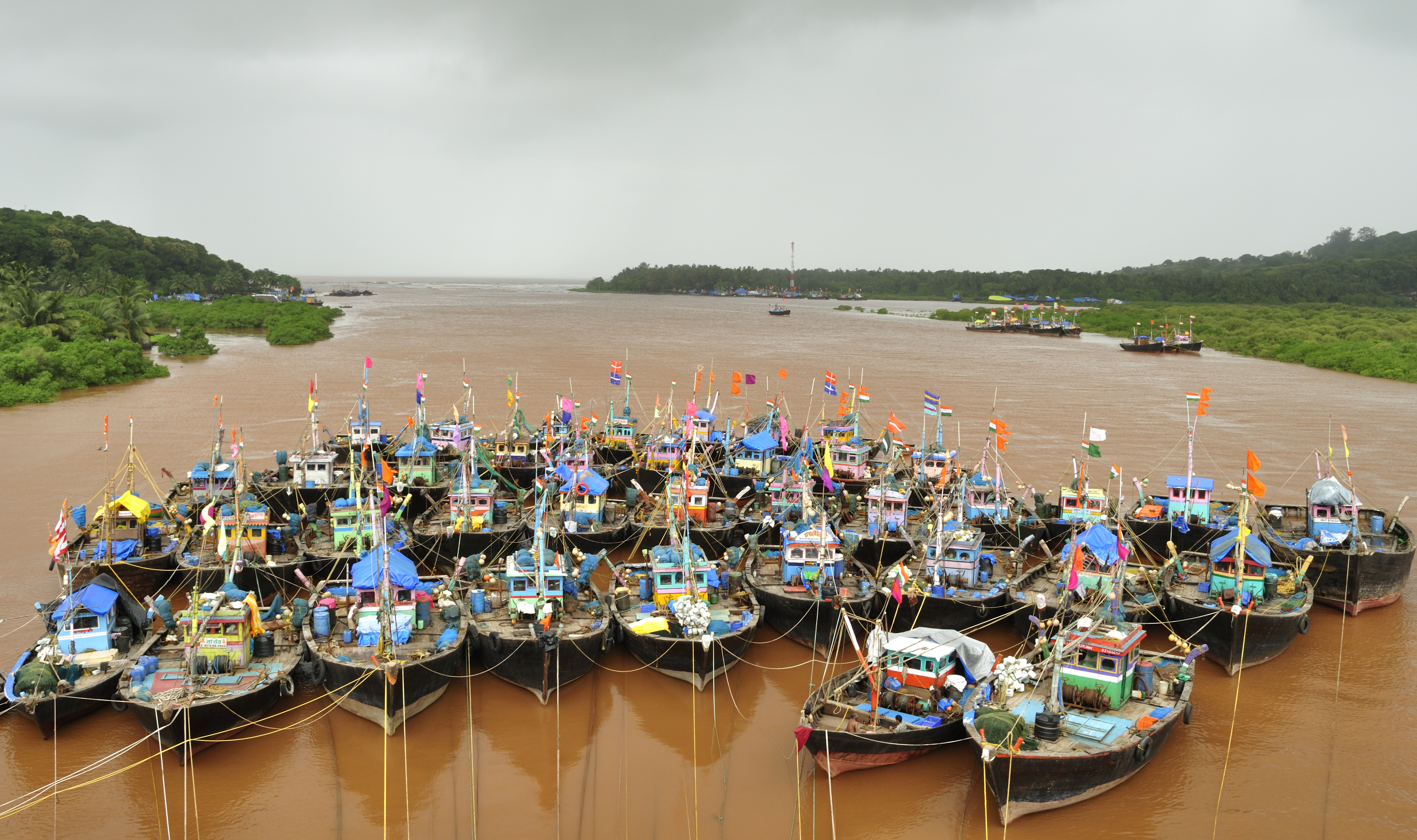
- Fishing boats at Anjarle creek
- Abbreviation: FSI
- Formation: 1983; 43 years ago (as Fishery Survey of India); 1946; 80 years ago (as Deep Sea Fishing Station)
- Purpose: Research and survey of traditional and deep sea fishing
- Headquarters: Fishing Harbour Complex, Sassoon Dock, Colaba, Mumbai, 400005
- Region served: India
- Parent organisation: Department of Animal Husbandry, Dairying and Fisheries, Ministry of Agriculture & Farmers Welfare, Government of India
- Staff: 752
- Website: www.fsi.gov.in

The Fishery Survey of India (FSI), founded in 1983 by the Government of India's Ministry of Agriculture & Farmers Welfare, for the fisheries studies, research and survey of the traditional and deep sea fisheries of India within India's Exclusive Economic Zone, is tasked with the preparation of an annual Fishery Resources Survey and "Assessment and Research Programme" for the sustainable fishery requirements of traditional fishermen, small and medium boat operators and industrial fleet of deep-sea longlining tuna fishing.

== History ==
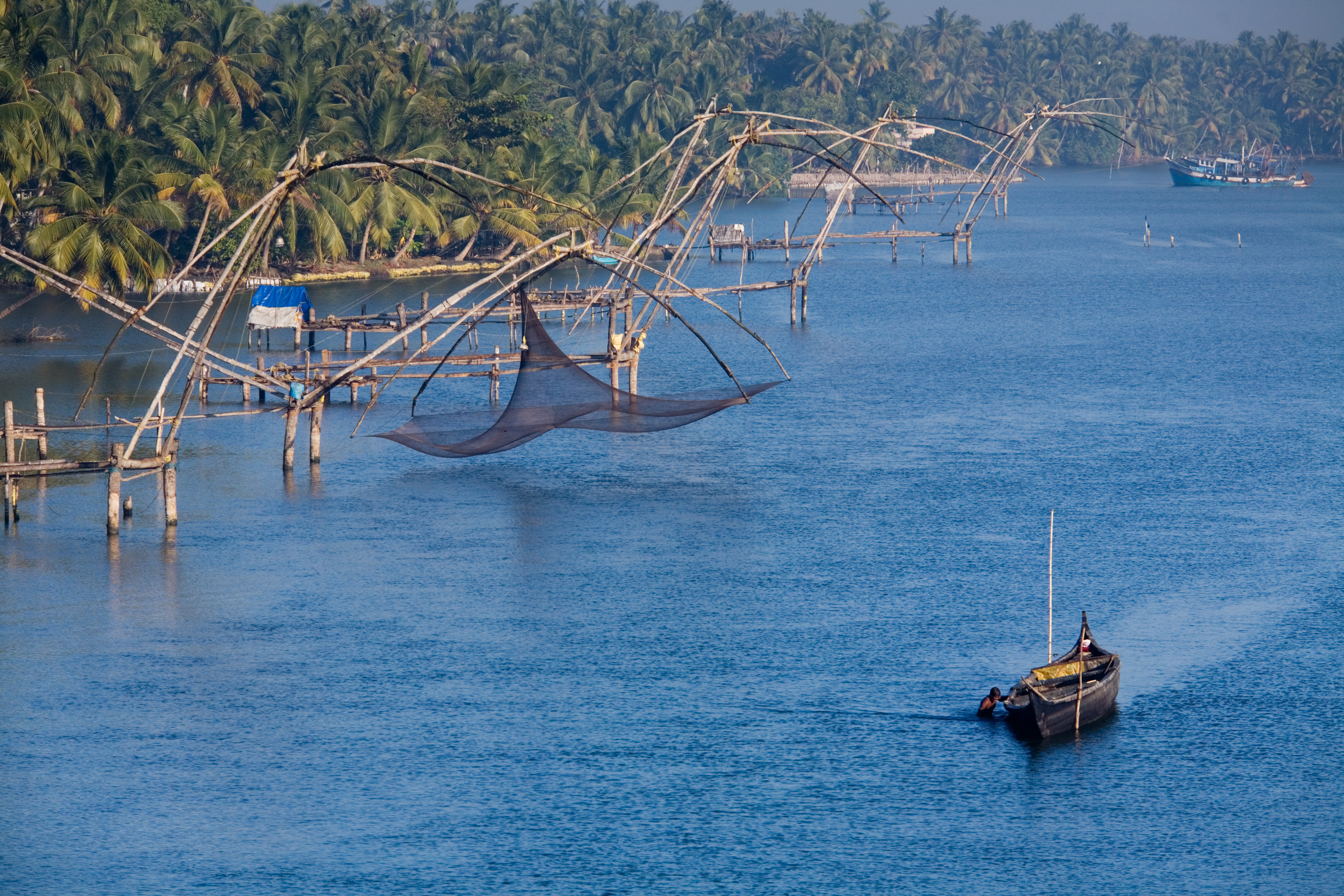
Chinese fishing nets at Fort Kochi.

FSI, renamed in 1983, has its origin in the establishment of "Deep Sea Fishing Station" pilot project by the Government in 1946. In 1974 it was renamed "Exploratory Fisheries Project" and granted the status of an institute. In 1983, after Exclusive Economic Zone (EEZ) come into force by UNCLS in 1982, the institute was renamed "Fishery Survey of India" and designated a national institute. In 2005 the Marine Engineering Division was transferred to FSI from NIFPHATT. In 2016, the institute moved to its new Headquarter at Sassoon Dock, Colaba in Mumbai. On 27 July 2017, "Deep Sea Fishing Project" was launched by Prime Minister Narendra Modi to end the bottom trawling fishing by providing incentives to 2,000 trawlers from Palk Bay to diversify into deep sea fishing.

== Importance ==
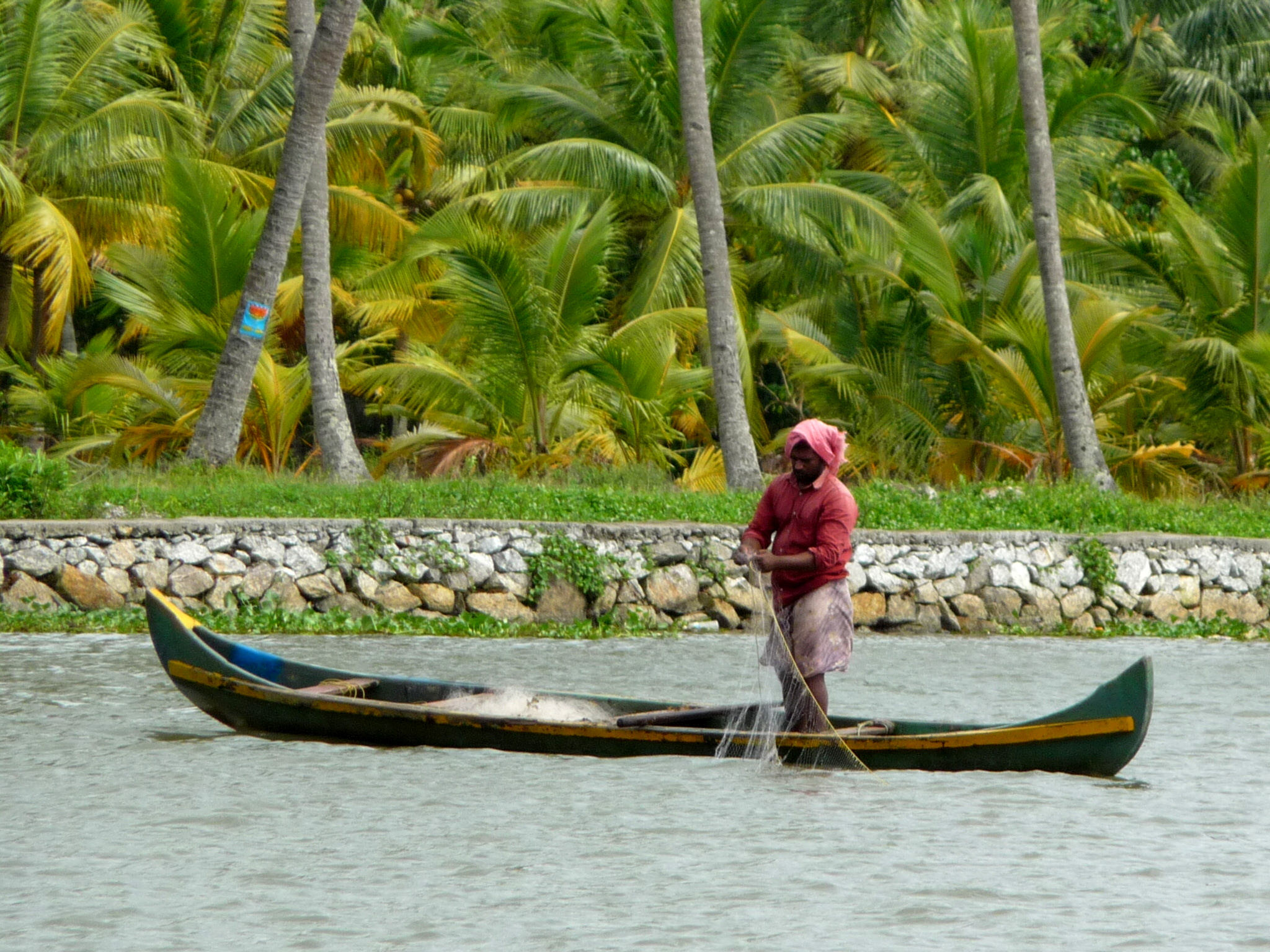
Traditional fishing in Kerala backwaters.

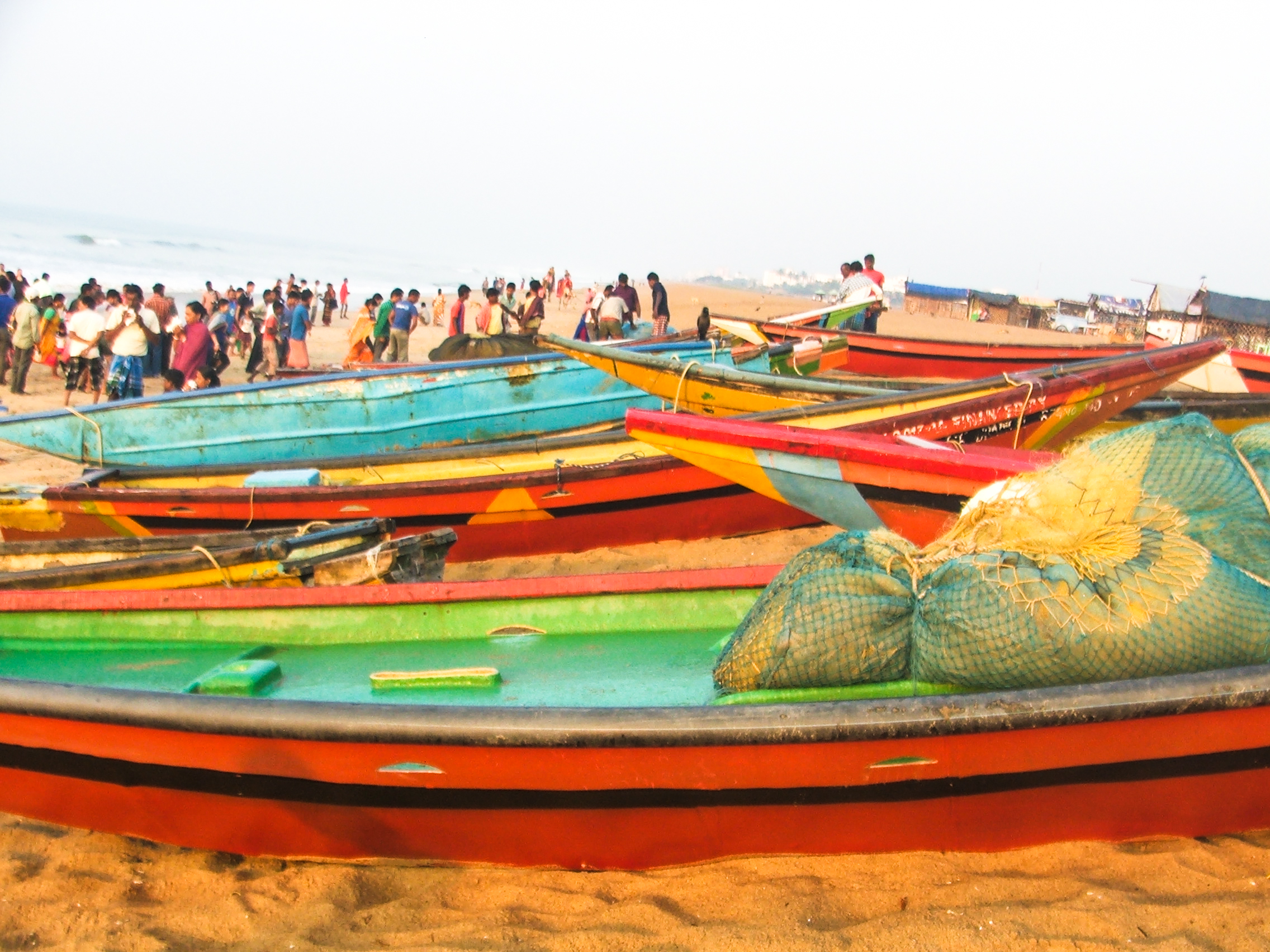
Fishing Boats, Early Morning, Puri Beach in Orissa.

India, with 8,118 km coastline, 2 million square kilometres Exclusive economic zone including 530,000km2 continental shelf and 6.3% of the world fisheries production, is second largest fisheries producer after China with 9.58 million tonnes total production and 1.05 million tonnes export worth INR 334.4 billion (US$5.57 billion) export revenue, with marine fishing constituting 35% share, 70% from west coast and 30% from east coast (2014-2015). India has 14 million people employed in fisheries, including 1.9 million fishermen with 80,000 mechanised fishing vessels, 75,000 motorised fishing boats and 50,000 traditional non-motorised fishing boats.

The largest output producer states are Andhra Pradesh 20%, West Bengal 15%, Gujarat 8%, Kerala 7%, Maharashtra 6% and Tamil Nadu 6% (2014-2015). Among processed exports, major exports are tuna, prawns, squid and cuttlefish. Export volumes and values respectively are: frozen shrimp 31% and 64%, fresh and frozen fish 33% and 14.2%, frozen squid 9% and 6%, and frozen cuttlefish 7% and 5%.

The largest importers of Indian fisheries output are USA 26%, ASEAN nations 26%, European Union 20% (export to UK will increase due to 2016 Brexit), Japan 9%, Middle East nations 6% and China 4%.

After the discovery of additional fishing resources in the annual surveys, the government has undertaken schemes to increase deep sea fishing to enhance the total output.

== Capabilities ==
As of 2016, FiSi has a fleet of 11 ocean survey vessels for Fishery Resources Survey spread across 6 major ports of India, with a total of 752 employees across India.
