= Doug Butterworth =

South African academic

Doug Butterworth OMS
- Born: Douglas Stuart Butterworth

Academic background
- Education: Bishops Diocesan College
- Alma mater: University of Cape Town; University College London

Academic work
- Discipline: Applied mathematics
- Sub-discipline: Fisheries science
- Institutions: University of Cape Town

Douglas Stuart Butterworth is a retired South African fisheries scientist and applied mathematician. He is professor emeritus of applied mathematics at the University of Cape Town, where he is the director of the Marine Resource Assessment and Management (MARAM) research group.

== Early life and education ==
Butterworth attended the Western Province Preparatory School in Cape Town, and he matriculated from nearby Bishops Diocesan College in 1963. Trained as a physicist, he holds an MSc from the University of Cape Town and a PhD in fundamental particle physics from University College London.

After his doctoral degree, he spent four months as an adjunct lecturer at the University of Natal. He returned to Cape Town in 1977 to work in applied mathematics for the Sea Fisheries Branch, unable to find a job in physics. He became involved in fisheries research in 1979, when he advised a co-worker – marine biologist Peter Best – about techniques for survey-based marine mammal abundance estimation. With Best's support, he became increasingly engaged in the research that Best was engaged in for the International Whaling Commission.

== University of Cape Town ==
After two years at the Sea Fisheries Branch, Butterworth joined the Department of Mathematics and Applied Mathematics at the University of Cape Town. His focus was applied mathematics and he primarily taught biomathematics and environmental modelling. His most important research concerned fisheries assessment, fisheries management, and related modelling.

In particular, Butterworth is known for developing the so-called management procedure approach to fisheries regulation in the late 1980s and early 1990s. The procedure originated in an informal competition undertaken by Butterworth and Andre Punt, a PhD student, against foreign research groups; in the course of the competition, Butterworth and Punt devised the procedure by using feedback control to refine computer simulations for whaling quotas. The management procedure approach is extremely compatible with the precautionary principle advocated by the Earth Summit. The approach was subsequently applied to calculate annual catch targets for South African hake, sardine, anchovy, and rock lobster, and it spread beyond South Africa: Butterworth has advised at least 12 other countries, as well as fishing industry associations and international bodies (among them the scientific committees of the United Nations Food and Agriculture Organisation and the Convention on International Trade in Endangered Species). In total, he has written over 1,500 technical reports, in addition to some 250 academic publications.

After he retired from teaching, Butterworth remained the director of the university's Marine Resource Assessment and Management (MARAM) research group.

== Honours and awards ==
Butterworth is a fellow of the Royal Society of South Africa. In October 2008, President Kgalema Motlanthe admitted him to the Order of Mapungubwe, granting him the award in silver for, "His excellent contribution to the betterment of the environment and sustainability of fisheries."

In September 2019, the Emperor of Japan admitted Butterworth to the Order of the Rising Sun, Third Class. Having served on the Japanese delegation to the scientific committee of the Commission for the Conservation of Southern Bluefin Tuna, he received the award for his contribution to the sustainable management of Japan's marine resources, particularly southern bluefin tuna.
