= Norman Hall (scientist) =

Australian fisheries scientist

Norman George Hall
- Education: University of Western Australia
- Known for: Research on fisheries modelling and fisheries stock assessment
- Awards: K. Radway Allen Award
- Scientific career
- Thesis: Modelling for fishery management, utilising data for selected species in Western Australia (2000)
- Doctoral advisor: Ian Potter; Nick Caputi

Norman George Hall is an Australian fisheries scientist, known for his work on fisheries modelling and fisheries stock assessment. He received the K. Radway Allen Award in 2005 for his contributions to fisheries science.

== Early years and education ==
Hall was born in Geraldton, Western Australia. In 1964, he obtained a B.Sc. (in mathematics) from the University of Western Australia, followed by a Dip.Ed. in 1965. Hall spent two years teaching mathematics and science at the Eastern Goldfields Senior High School in Kalgoorlie, before taking up a lecturing position at Leederville Technical College in Perth. From 1967–1969, he studied part-time, again at the University of Western Australia, to complete a postgraduate Dip. Comp. After decades of working in fisheries science, Hall submitted his PhD thesis at Murdoch University in 2000, and formally graduated the following year.

== Career ==
In August 1969, Hall began working as a researcher at the Western Australian Department of Fisheries and Fauna. In this role, he helped develop models of the prawn fisheries in Shark Bay and Exmouth Gulf. He remained in the department until October 1995, at which stage he was a Principal Research Scientist.

In the early- and mid-1970s, Hall was "one of the few computer-literate staff" in the department's fisheries and wildlife research branches, and undertook much of their data processing and computer programming. After attending a course by Carl Walters and Ray Hilborn, Hall was inspired to use computer modelling approaches to help assess Australian fisheries stocks. To help his colleagues develop the skills necessary for these approaches, he presented short courses at fisheries agencies around the country. From 1995 to 2001, Hall served as a Supervising Scientist with the department’s Stock Assessment and Data Analysis (SADA) Group. From 2001, he worked in Murdoch University's Centre for Fish and Fisheries Research, before retiring in 2008. Following his retirement, he returned to a part-time role with SADA, and continued to be involved with research at Murdoch University.

Hall is a long-time member of the Australian Society for Fish Biology. From 2003–2007, he served on the Editorial Advisory Committee of the journal Marine and Freshwater Research.

== Honours ==
In 1999, Hall won the Minister for Fisheries’ Innovation and Technical Excellence Award (presented by Monty House), for his work within the Western Australian Department of Fisheries. In 2005, he received the K. Radway Allen Award, the highest award given by the Australian Society for Fish Biology, in recognition of his contributions to fisheries science.
