= World Council of Fisheries Societies =

- Formation: 1992
- Type: non-profit organisation
- Headquarters: Bethesda, Maryland, USA
- President: Bronwyn Gillanders
- Website: wcfs.fisheries.org

The World Council of Fisheries Societies is a non-profit, non-governmental organisation intended to promote international cooperation in fisheries science, conservation and management. The Council consists of 10 member organisations, and arose from the 1st World Fisheries Congress in Athens, Greece in 1992.

== Membership ==
The council currently comprises 10 member organisations:

- American Fisheries Society
- Australian Society for Fish Biology
- Canadian Aquatic Resources Section
- Fisheries Society of the British Isles
- Indian Society of Fisheries Professionals
- Japanese Society of Fisheries Science
- Korean Society of Fisheries and Aquatic Sciences
- Mexican Fisheries Society
- World Sturgeon Conservation Society
- Zoological Society of Pakistan

== World Fisheries Congress ==
Every four years, the World Council of Fisheries Societies runs an international conference event called the World Fisheries Congress.

| Congress | Year | Host city |
|---|---|---|
| 1st | 1992 | Athens, Greece |
| 2nd | 1996 | Brisbane, Australia |
| 3rd | 2000 | Beijing, China |
| 4th | 2004 | Vancouver, Canada |
| 5th | 2008 | Yokohama, Japan |
| 6th | 2012 | Edinburgh, Scotland |
| 7th | 2016 | Busan, South Korea |
| 8th (Note: The 8th World Fisheries Congress was originally scheduled for 11–15 October 2020, but was postponed for one year due to the COVID-19 pandemic.) | 2021 | Adelaide, Australia |
| 9th | 2024 | Seattle, United States |
