= Fishery Bulletin =

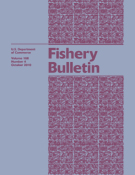
- Discipline: Zoology
- Language: English
- Edited by: Richard D. Brodeur

Publication details
- Former names: Bulletin of the United States Fish Commission, Bulletin of the Bureau of Fisheries, Bulletin of the United States Fish Commission, Fishery Bulletin of the Fish and Wildlife Service
- History: 1881–present
- Publisher: National Oceanic and Atmospheric Administration (United States)
- Frequency: Quarterly
- Open access: Yes
- License: public domain
- Impact factor: 1.135 (2012)

Standard abbreviations
- ISO 4: Fish. Bull. (Wash. D. C.)

Indexing
- CODEN: FSYBAY
- ISSN: 0090-0656
- LCCN: 72625459
- OCLC no.: 01783998

Links
- Journal homepage; Online access

The Fishery Bulletin is a quarterly peer-reviewed scientific journal published by the National Oceanic and Atmospheric Administration.

It was established in 1881 and was until 1903 published as the Bulletin of the United States Fish Commission by the United States Fish Commission. The journal then went through a number of changes in its name: Bulletin of the Bureau of Fisheries (1904–1911), Bulletin of the United States Fish Commission (1912–1940), Fishery Bulletin of the Fish and Wildlife Service (1941–1970), and finally from 1971, Fishery Bulletin. All content has been scanned and is available through the journal's page or the site maintained by the NOAA Central library.

Its editorial board is headed by biologist Jose I. Castro, editor Kathryn Dennis and communicologist Cara Mayo. Currently, it also includes renowned researchers such as Henry L. Bart Jr, Katherine E. Bemis, Matthew D. Campbell, William B. Driggers III, Gretchen L. Grammer, Richard Langton, J. Fernando Márquez-Farías, Richard S. McBride, Richard L. Merrick, Richard D. Methot, Lisa J. Natanson, Mark S. Peterson, André E. Punt, Joseph M. Quattro, John F. Walter III. Although over the years it has had the participation of many important personalities of the guild as members of the editorial board.
