= Elizabeth A. Fulton =

Ecosystem Modeller

Elizabeth A. Fulton FAA FTSE
- Other name: Beth Fulton
- Education: James Cook University
- Occupation: Senior Principal Research Scientist
- Employer: CSIRO
- Known for: Ecosystem modeller

Elizabeth A. Fulton (born 1973), also known as Beth Fulton, is an Australian ecosystem modeller, who was elected a Fellow of the Australian Academy of Science in 2022. She is a Research Group Leader at CSIRO Oceans & Atmosphere in Hobart, Tasmania.

== Career ==
Fulton was born in 1973 on a farm near Goulburn, NSW, and expressed a keen interest in maths as well a curiosity about the natural environment. Fulton was awarded her BSc in Mathematics and Marine Biology from James Cook University (1997), and her PhD from the University of Tasmania in 2000. Her thesis was titled ‘The effects of the structure and formulation of ecosystem models on model performance’.

Fulton started working at CSIRO in 2001, investigating indicators of the ecological effects of fishing. She developed the model Atlantis, and was appointed a research scientist in 2004. The Atlantis model was evaluated to be the 'world's best for evaluation of marine fisheries by the United Nations Food and Agriculture Organisation, and was utilised to provide advice on fisheries within the United States, Europe and Australia. She also worked on the model InVitro, which explores the impacts and managements of different pressures on coastal and marine environments. The models give equal weighting to both human and biophysical components within marine ecosystems. Fulton has described the process of building complex models as follows:

"We need to talk to the people who’ve spent their lives studying the different bits of the system – currents, climate, plankton, fish, sharks, whales, fisherman, local shop keepers, managers, the whole kit and kaboodle. We spend months getting the thing going and making sure it works like the real thing, we try to make it as accurate as possible."

== Media ==
Fulton has published her marine biology work in The Conversation, on extreme weather impacts due to climate change, on exploring the future with models, on how Australia could be self-sufficient, warming oceans changing the fishing industry, as well as damage to Australia's coasts, from extreme weather.

== Publications ==
- Lessons in modelling and management of marine ecosystems: the Atlantis experience (2011). EA Fulton, JS Link, IC Kaplan, M Savina‐Rolland, P Johnson, et al. Fish and fisheries 12 (2), 171–188. doi.org/10.1111/j.1467-2979.2011.00412.x
- Next-generation ensemble projections reveal higher climate risks for marine ecosystems (2021) DP Tittensor, C Novaglio, CS Harrison, RF Heneghan, N Barrier, et al. Nature climate change 11 (11), 973–981.doi.org/10.1038/s41558-021-01173-9
- Rebuilding global fisheries (2009) B Worm, R Hilborn, JK Baum, TA Branch, JS Collie, C Costello, ...Science 325 (5940), 578–585. DOI: 10.1126/science.1173146.

== Awards ==
- 2022 - Fellow of the Australian Academy of Science
- 2022 - Fellow of the Australian Academy of Technological Sciences and Engineering
- 2020 - Beverton Medal distinguished scientist for a lifelong contribution to fisheries science - Fisheries Society of the British Isles
- 2019 - K. Radway Allen Award for outstanding contribution in fish or fisheries science - Australian Society for Fish Biology
- 2017-2020 - Highly Cited Researcher in Plant & Animal Science - Clarivate Analytics
- 2017 - Biennial medallist - Modelling and Simulation Society of Australia and New Zealand* 2016 - Hall of Fame Australian Society For Fish Biology
- 2011 - Sustainability Science Award - ESA
- 2010 - Pew Marine Science Fellowship - Pew
- 2007 - Science Minister's Prize for Life Scientist of the Year, Australian Prime Minister's Science Prizes
- 2004 - Award for outstanding PhD, Royal Society of Tasmania
