= Jim Wharton =

Australian fisheries scientist

James C. F. Wharton
- Died: 24 January 2007
- Known for: Director of the Victorian Department of Fisheries and Wildlife; president of Australian Society for Fish Biology

James C. F. "Jim" Wharton (died 24 January 2007) was an Australian fisheries scientist, who was the director of the Victorian Department of Fisheries and Wildlife.

== Career ==
In September 1952, Wharton was assigned to run the Snobs Creek Freshwater Fisheries Research Station and Native Fish Hatchery in Victoria, Australia. In the early 1960s, he visited the United States under a Harkness Fellowship administered by the Commonwealth Fund. Wharton was the deputy director (from 1963) and then Director of the Victorian Department of Fisheries and Wildlife. He later moved to Lennox Heads, New South Wales, where he consulted for Australian-American Fisheries. He died on 24 January 2007.

== Involvement in professional societies ==
In September 1961, Wharton and two colleagues (Hilary Jolly and John Lake) sent out a circular to scientists involved in freshwater research, proposing the formation of a dedicated society. A meeting to discuss this possibility was held on 21 October 1961 at the Australian National University, resulting in the formation of the Australian Society of Limnology (later the Australian Society for Limnology). The society's inaugural meeting took place at Monash University in May 1962. Wharton remained a member of the society until 2002. He was also an early president of the Australian Society for Fish Biology in 1975.
