= The Committee of Three =

Group of scientists gathered with regards to whaling policy

The Committee of Three was a panel of three scientists (Kenneth Radway Allen, Douglas G. Chapman and Sidney Holt) who were selected in 1960 to advise the International Whaling Commission on whaling quotas. They found new methods to calculate whaling quotas and by analyzing whaling data (catches, the number of whaling boats etc.) they came up with proposals for annual quotas for whales. The panel's report, in 1961, was the international whaling commission's first attempt to come up with quotas that would permit whaling while allowing the whale population to increase. The three scientists on the panel were selected because they specialized in fisheries research but were not officially connected with Norway, the Soviet Union, the Netherlands, Japan or Britain, the countries conducting the whaling they were to study. The quotas recommended were so much lower than usual that the whaling countries argued over them for many years but eventually they had to lower the quotas. However the whaling countries first adopted interim, compromise quotas which were higher than recommended.

A fourth member, John Gulland, was added to the committee in 1961, but the committee continued to be referred to by its original name.
