= David Bellwood =

Australian marine biologist

David Roy Bellwood
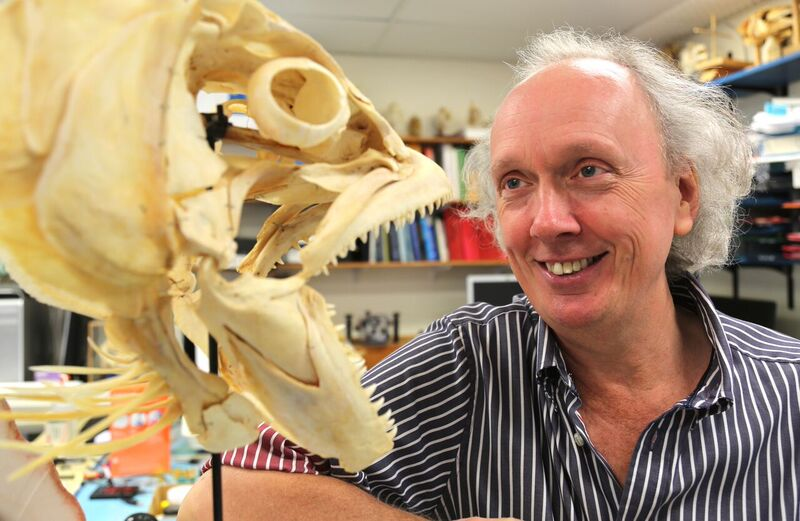
- Bellwood with the skull of a dogtooth tuna, 2017
- Born: Yorkshire, England
- Education: University of Bath
- Known for: Research on coral reef fish
- Awards: K. Radway Allen Award; Fellow of the Australian Academy of Science; Bleeker Award, IPFC, Tahiti 2017; Jubilee Award, Australian Marine Sciences Association, 2018; Australian Research Council Laureate Fellowship, 2019
- Scientific career
- Thesis: The functional morphology, systematics and behavioural ecology of parrotfishes (family Scaridae) (1985)
- Website: www.thebellwoodreeffishlab.com

David Roy Bellwood is an Australian marine biologist. Bellwood studies the ecology, biogeography and evolution of marine fishes, and in 2016 was elected to the Australian Academy of Science.

== Early life ==
Bellwood was born in Huddersfield, Yorkshire, England. He graduated from the University of Bath in 1980, with Honours, having studied the effects of cyanide as an anaesthetic for reef fishes. He worked on North Sea inshore fishing trawlers and trained in taxonomy at the Natural History Museum in London, under zoologist Geoffrey Boxshall.

== Career ==
Bellwood completed his PhD research at James Cook University in Townsville, Australia, where he studied parrotfishes from 1981 to 1985. He subsequently undertook a one-year postdoctoral position at Silliman University in the Philippines. In 1988, Bellwood returned to James Cook University, first as a postdoctoral researcher with Howard Choat and then, in 1991, as a Lecturer. In 2004, he was promoted to a Personal Professorial Research Chair in Marine Biology, and then to Distinguished Professor in 2015, becoming an Australian Research Council Laureate Fellow in 2019. Bellwood's research interests are wide-ranging, and his work spans the "systematics, evolution, biogeography, biology and ecology of reef fishes from both tropical and temperate seas." Bellwood currently teaches ‘Reef fish evolution and ecology’ and ‘Marine biogeography’ at James Cook University. Since 1992, Bellwood has led the Reef Fish Research Lab at James Cook University.

== Awards and honours ==
In 2015, the Australian Society for Fish Biology awarded Bellwood its highest honour, the K. Radway Allen Award. Bellwood was elected to the Australian Academy of Science in 2016 . He received the Bleeker Award in Ecology at the Indo-Pacific Fish Conference in Tahiti in 2017 and the Jubilee Award from the Australian Marine Sciences Association in 2018. In 2019, he was awarded an Australian Research Council Laureate Fellowship.

== Selected publications ==
- Bellwood, D.R., Hughes, T.P., Folke, C., & Nyström (2004) Confronting the coral reef crisis. Nature, 429(6994): 827
- Bellwood, D.R., Goatley, C. H. R., & Bellwood, O. (2017) The evolution of fishes and corals on reefs: form, function and interdependence. Biological Reviews, 92(2): 878-901
