= Radway Allen =

New Zealand academic (1911–2008)

- Born: Kenneth Radway Allen; 12 February 1911; Hornsey, Middlesex, England
- Died: 16 February 2008 (aged 97); Rockdale, New South Wales, Australia

Kenneth Radway Allen (12 February 1911 – 16 February 2008) was a New Zealand fisheries biologist.

== Academic career ==
After a MSc from Cambridge University Allen arrived in New Zealand and worked for what was to become the DSIR for many years on fisheries matters. In 1972 he moved to Cronulla, south of Sydney, New South Wales to become head of the CSIRO Division of Fisheries and Oceanography, where he worked until he retired. Allen was elected a Fellow of the Royal Society of New Zealand in 1961. Since 1995, the Australian Society for Fish Biology has awarded the K. Radway Allen Award to researchers who have made "an outstanding contribution in fish or fisheries science."

== The International Whaling Commission (IWC) and The Committee of Three ==
Allen worked on the International Whaling Commission's panel termed The Committee of Three that found new methods to calculate whaling quotas. The group analysed whaling data (catches, the number of whaling boats etc.) to come up with proposals for annual quotas for whales. The panel's report, in 1961, was the international whaling commission's first attempt to come up with quotas that would permit whaling while allowing the whale population to increase. The three scientists on the panel (Allen, Douglas G. Chapman and Sidney Holt) were selected because they specialised in fisheries research but were not officially connected with Norway, the Soviet Union, the Netherlands, Japan or Britain, the countries conducting the whaling they were to study. The quotas recommended were so much lower than usual that the whaling countries argued over them for many years but eventually they had to lower the quotas. However the whaling countries first adopted interim, compromise quotas which were higher than recommended.
