= Sidney Holt =

British marine biologist

Sidney J. Holt (28 February 1926 – 22 December 2019) was a British biologist who was a founder of fisheries science. He was best known for the book On the Dynamics of Exploited Fish Populations which he published with Ray Beverton in 1957. The book is a cornerstone of modern fisheries science and remains much used today. Holt served with the FAO in 1953 and with other UN agencies for another 25 years. After his retirement in 1979, Holt remained active in work related to the International Whaling Commission and conservation of whales in general, also publishing his views about whaling and fisheries management in academic journals.

== Achievements ==
Much of the foundations of quantitative fisheries science were laid out in the book On the Dynamics of Exploited Fish Populations which Beverton and Holt wrote at the Fisheries Laboratory in Lowestoft (UK). In his review of the 1993 reprint of the book, Ray Hilborn writes "It is remarkable how the book has stood the test of time and still provides a survey of the important topics in fisheries management." The book was reprinted in 2004 with a new foreword by Holt.

Holt's later achievements mostly related to whaling. According to Beverton, Holt "saved the great whales in the early 1970s". The legacy of the 1957 Beverton and Holt treatise is commemorated in the volume Advances in Fisheries Science. 50 years on from Beverton and Holt. The volume includes a foreword by Holt. Outside fisheries science, Holt is best known for the Beverton–Holt model. In population ecology the model is used as a stand-alone discrete time population model or as a model of density dependence in larger population models. Originally the model had a more specific usage; it was devised to describe the dependence of recruitment on spawning stock biomass.

== The International Whaling Commission (IWC) and The Committee of Three ==
Holt worked on the International Whaling Commission's panel termed The Committee of Three that found new methods to calculate whaling quotas. The group analyzed whaling data (catches, the number of whaling boats etc.) to come up with proposals for annual quotas for whales. The panel's report, in 1961, was the international whaling commission's first attempt to come up with quotas that would permit whaling while allowing the whale population to increase. The three scientists on the panel (Kenneth Radway Allen, Douglas G. Chapman and Holt) were selected because they specialized in fisheries research but were not officially connected with Norway, the Soviet Union, the Netherlands, Japan or Britain, the countries conducting the whaling they were to study. The quotas recommended were so much lower than usual that the whaling countries argued over them for many years but eventually they had to lower the quotas. However the whaling countries first adopted interim, compromise quotas which were higher than recommended.

== See also ==
- Population dynamics of fisheries
