= Peter C. Young =

British-born ichthyologist and parasitologist

Peter Colin Young
- Born: 9 February 1940; Sutton, Surrey, United Kingdom
- Education: University of London
- Known for: Chief of Division of Fisheries at CSIRO; president of Australian Society for Fish Biology
- Awards: K. Radway Allen Award

Peter Colin Young (born 9 February 1940) is a British-born ichthyologist and parasitologist who spent most of his career in Australia. From 1995 to 1997, he served as president of the Australian Society for Fish Biology.

== Early life ==
Young was born in Sutton, Surrey, England on 9 February 1940. He studied at the University of London after receiving a scholarship from the county of Surrey, and graduated in 1962 with a BSc majoring in zoology. He completed an Honours in Parasitology at Imperial College London. From 1963 to 1965, Young undertook his PhD at the University of Queensland, Australia. During this time, he accompanied Harold Manter, an expert on Digenean trematodes of fish, who was on sabbatical from the University of Nebraska, on field trips to Heron Island and Stradbroke Island to help catch fish. He had originally planned to study the ecology of Monogenea trematodes and their hosts, but, finding that so many of his specimens were undescribed, decided to become a taxonomist instead. Young published nine papers from his doctoral research.

== Research career ==
After completing his PhD, Young became a Scientific Officer at the Commonwealth Bureau of Helminthology at St Albans, England, studying ascaridoids in fish and marine mammals. His study taxa included Contracaecum, Anisakis and Terranova. At the 1969 Oceanology International Conference, he presented a joint paper on the "cod worm" (Terranova) and its potential risks to public health. His research showed that, although grey seals could transmit cod worms to cod, the species they transmitted was not a major risk to humans.

In 1970, Young returned to Australia to work for the Commonwealth Scientific and Industrial Research Organisation (CSIRO), as a research scientist in the Division of Fisheries and Oceanography at Deception Bay, Queensland. He was project leader for the organisation's East Coast Prawn project, studying mortality rates and zoogeography of penaeid prawns. During this period, he also undertook research on coastal and estuarine seagrass communities. From 1975 to 1980, Young led the CSIRO sub-program studying community ecology and pollution. Between 1981 and 1985, he led the CSIRO Living Resources, Temperate Species Group, which, beginning in 1982, also included the Tropical Species Group. His research showed that male lethrinid fish (tropical emperors) are larger than females due to sex change, and not because of differential growth rates. He also showed that sex change occurred in nemipterid species.

Between September 1984 and January 1985, Young was Officer-in-Charge of CSIRO's Division of Fisheries at Cronulla Marine Laboratories in Sydney. In 1985, he was appointed Program Leader of the Fisheries Resources South and Southeast. Between 1990 and 1996, Young was Chief of the CSIRO's Division of Fisheries. (Note: Some sources give the period 1990–1997.) From 1992 to 1996, he served as Director of the Australian Fisheries Management Authority. He was also an Honorary Research Professor at the University of Tasmania from 1993 until his retirement, in 1996.

From 1995 to 1997, Young served as the 16th President of the Australian Society for Fish Biology. He became a CSIRO Special Research Fellow in 1997. During his career, Young authored or co-authored at least 50 research papers and wrote or edited nine significant books. In 1992, Young donated his 536-specimen collection of monogeneid trematodes, most of which had been collected in Queensland waters, to the Queensland Museum. He retired to a 12-acre property on the outskirts of Brisbane, Queensland, where his hobbies include playing the violin and replanting rainforest on his property.

== Awards and honours ==
In 1995, the Australian Society for Fish Biology awarded Young the inaugural K. Radway Allen Award, the society's highest honour, to recognise his achievements in fish and fisheries research.
