= K. Radway Allen Award =

The K. Radway Allen Award is the highest honour awarded by the Australian Society for Fish Biology. It recognises individuals who have made an "outstanding contribution in fish or fisheries science." The award, inaugurated in 1995, is named for New Zealand fisheries biologist Kenneth Radway Allen.

Although the process of the award is annual, it is not necessarily awarded every year. Between 1995 and 2013, the K. Radway Allen Award was given every two to four years; since 2013, it has been awarded annually. Recipients need not be a member of the Australian Society for Fish Biology, although most of their research must have been undertaken in Australia.

== K. Radway Allen ==
Kenneth Radway Allen (1911 – 2008) was a New Zealand fisheries biologist. After a MSc from Cambridge University, Allen arrived in New Zealand and worked for many years at what was to become the Department of Scientific and Industrial Research. In 1972, he moved to Cronulla, south of Sydney, New South Wales, to become head of the CSIRO Division of Fisheries and Oceanography, where he worked until he retired.

== Recipients ==
The K. Radway Allen Award was first awarded in 1995, to researcher Peter C. Young. As of July 2020, 14 researchers have received the honour.

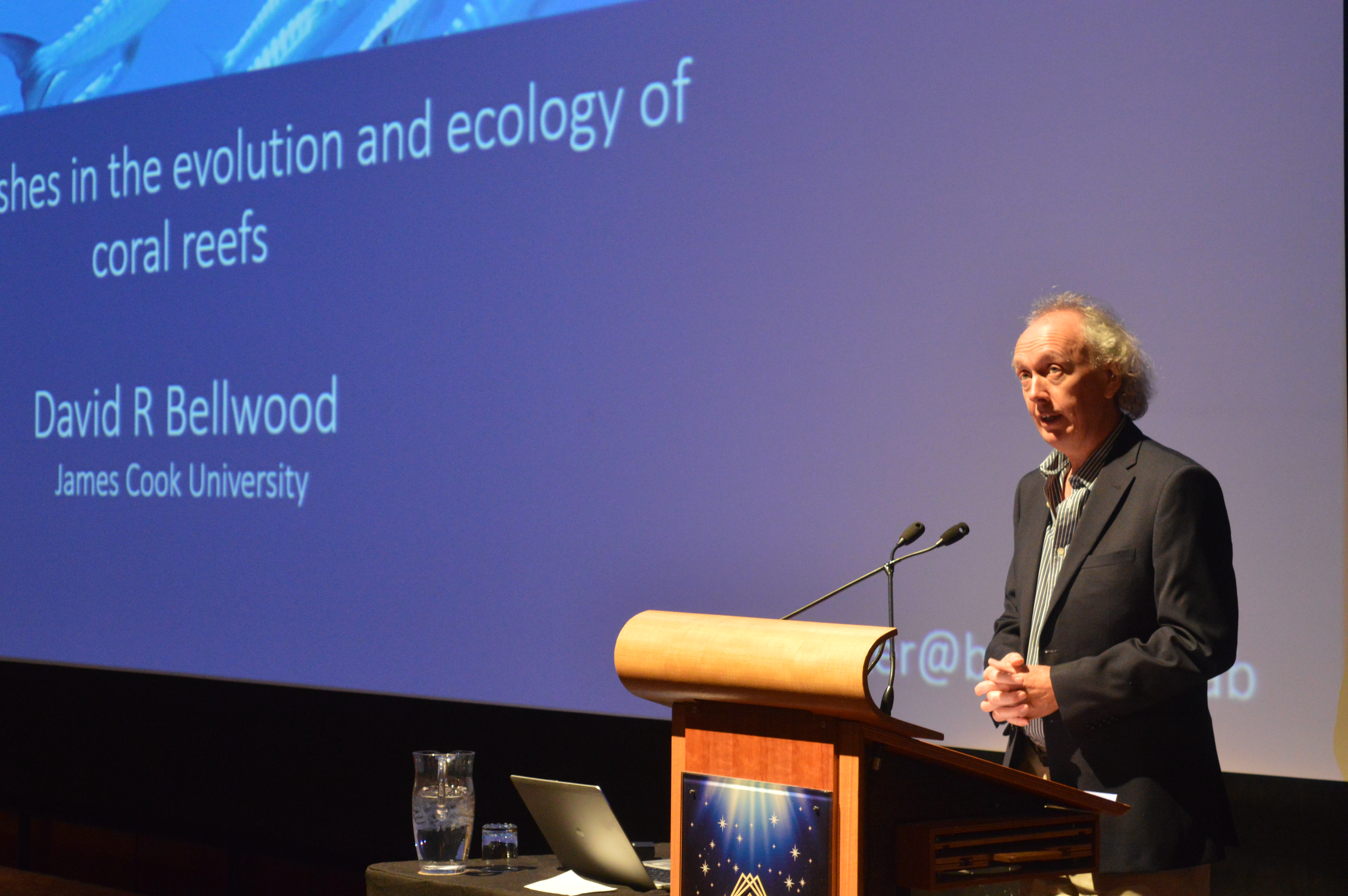
2015 awardee David Bellwood presents at the 2016 conference in Hobart, Tasmania.

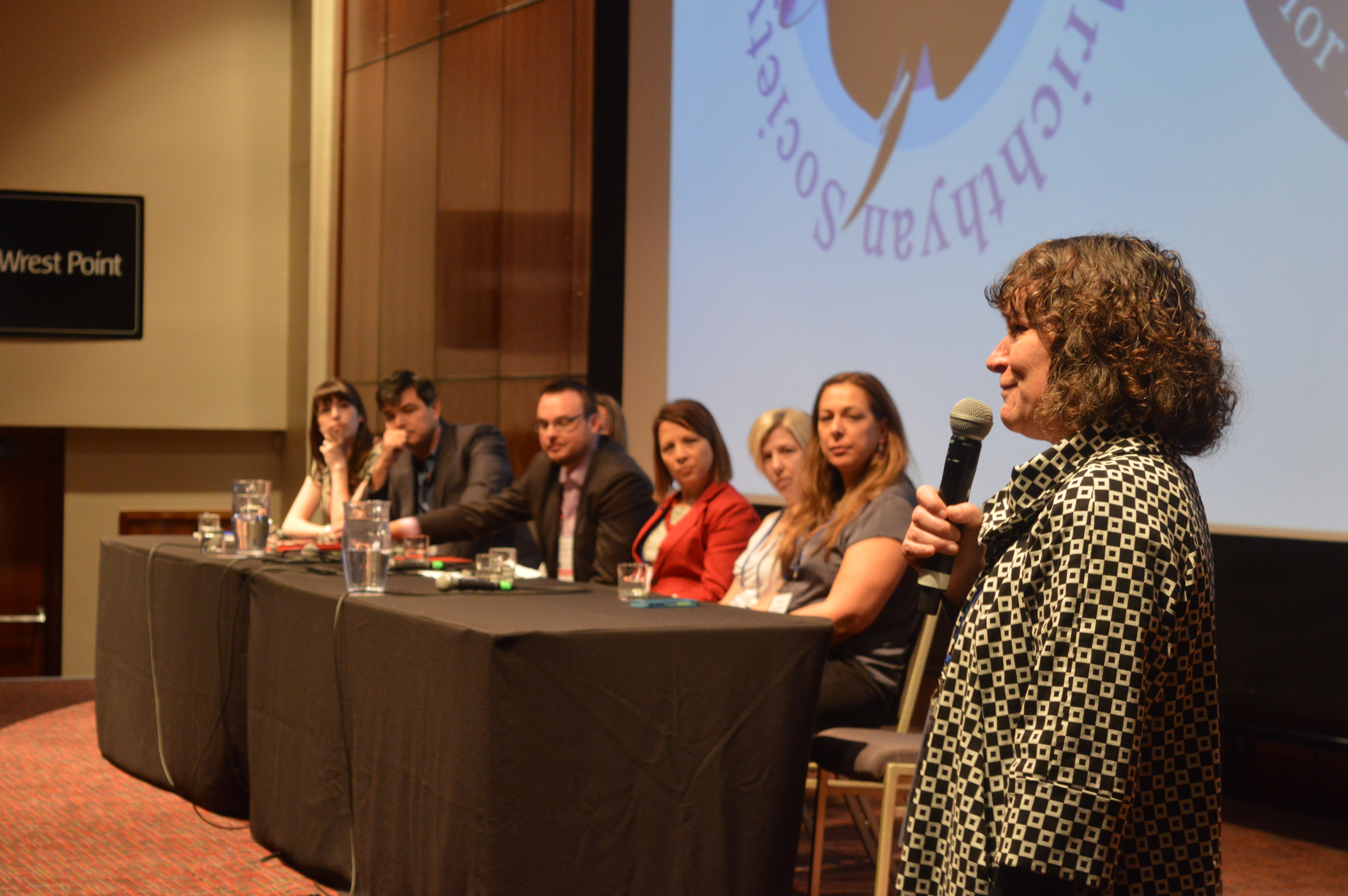
2016 awardee Bronwyn Gillanders speaks at the 2016 ASFB conference

Year	Recipient	Ref.
1995	Peter C. Young	
1997	John Paxton	
1999	Andre Punt	
2003	Gerry Allen	
2005	Norm Hall	
2008	Jeff Leis	
2009	Peter Last	
2011	Rod Lenanton	
2013	John Stevens	
2015	David Bellwood	
2016	Bronwyn Gillanders	
2017	Michael Kingsford	
2018	Alistair Hobday	
2019	Beth Fulton	
2021	Gretta Pecl	
2022	Anthony D. M. (Tony) Smith	
2023	Anthony (Tony) Fowler	

== See also ==
- List of biology awards
