= International Game Fish Association =

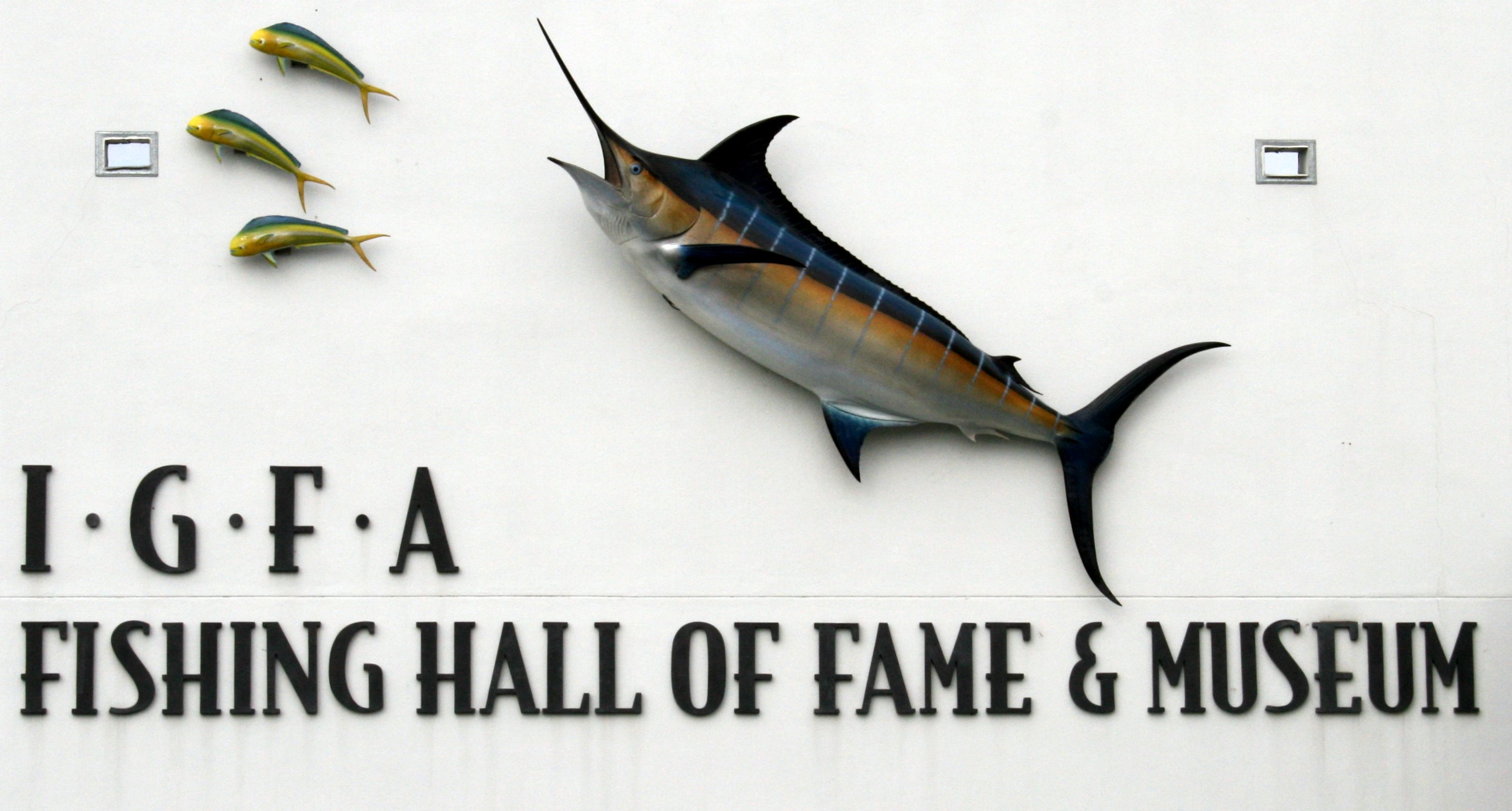
- The IGFA Hall of Fame and Museum

- Location within Florida
- Established: 1939
- Location: Dania Beach, Florida
- Coordinates: 26.059249°N 80.164435°W
- Type: Hall of Fame, Conservation Organization
- President: Jason Schratwieser
- Website: www.igfa.org

The International Game Fish Association (IGFA) is considered the leading authority on sports fishing and the keeper of the most current world record fishing catches by fish categories. They have an annual publication called the "World Record Game Fishes". The publication contains notable sports fishing achievements, fishing tips, and a fish identification guide.

IGFA is headquartered in Dania Beach, Florida.

== Organization and structure ==
The International Game Fish Association is a nonprofit, tax exempt organization, supported by its membership and governed by an executive committee and Board of Trustees. An elected International Committee of more than 300 sport fishermen and women represents the IGFA in fishing areas throughout the world. International Committee members act as liaisons between recreational fishermen, fishing clubs, local governments and fishery agencies in their areas and IGFA headquarters.

== Objectives, projects, and services ==
The purpose of IGFA, as set forth in the early bylaws, is: "to encourage the study of game fishes for the sake of whatever pleasure, information, or benefit it may provide; to keep the sport of game fishing ethical, and to make its rules acceptable to the majority of anglers; to encourage this sport both as recreation and as a potential source of scientific data; to place such data at the disposal of as many human beings as possible; and to keep an attested and up-to-date chart of world record catches." The IGFA at current has not changed these goals significantly; rather it has adapted them to the current and increasing needs of the sportfishing community.

=== World record keeping ===
IGFA maintains and publishes world records for saltwater, freshwater, fly fishing catches, U.S. state freshwater records, and junior angler records, awarding certificates of recognition to each record holder. Recognized as the official keeper of world saltwater fishing records since 1939, IGFA entered the field of freshwater record keeping when Field & Stream transferred its 68 years of records to the association in 1978.

=== International Angling Regulations ===
The equipment and fishing regulations adopted worldwide are formulated, updated, and published by IGFA to promote sporting angling practices, to establish uniform rules for world record catches, and to provide angling guidelines for use in tournaments and other group fishing activities.

=== IGFA Legendary Captains and Crew Awards ===
Starting in 2011, the Tommy Gifford Award is presented each year to several recipients of the IGFA Legendary Captains and Crew Awards.

=== IGFA Recognition Awards ===
==== IGFA Conservation Awards ====
The IGFA Conservation Awards were established in 1993.

Notable recipients include:

- Julian Pepperell 1999, marine biologist
- Thomas Remengesau Jr. 2014, ninth President of Palau

=== E.K. Harry Library of Fishes ===
Established in 1973 in response to the need for a permanent repository for angling literature, history, films, art, photographs, and artifacts, this library houses a comprehensive collection on game fish, angling, and related subjects.

=== Fishery research ===
IGFA has continuously supported scientific tagging and other data collection programs, and works closely with fishery biologists in order to exchange information and relay to anglers the particular needs and results of research and conservation efforts.

=== Fishery legislation ===
IGFA serves as consultant to administrative and legislative bodies around the world in order to ensure that the angler is fairly represented in decisions concerning the management of game fish populations and other issues which affect the future of recreational fishing.

== History ==
Before 1939 there was no universal code of sporting ethics to guide ocean anglers in their pursuits. Some rules pertaining to sporting conduct were in effect at certain well-established fishing clubs but they varied according to the dictates of each club. The idea of a worldwide association of marine anglers had been brewing for some time in England, Australia, and the United States, and the first steps in this direction were taken in the late 1930s by members of the British Tunny Club who hoped to establish headquarters in England to formulate rules for ethical angling. The threat of war, however, interrupted their plans.

At that same time, Michael Lerner was organizing a fishing expedition to the waters of Australia and New Zealand in conjunction with the American Museum of Natural History in New York. He heard of the British Tunny Club's plans, and when he arrived in Australia he looked up one of the country's finest anglers, Clive Firth, to discuss the idea with him. Firth was well aware of the angling feats of Californians, Floridians, Long Islanders and others. He felt that England and her colonies would accept American judgement as sporting and impartial, and that Americans should be the ones to devise and administer these ethical angling rules.

Dr. William King Gregory, head of the Departments of Ichthyology and Comparative Anatomy at the American Museum of Natural History, also was a member of the Australia-New Zealand expedition. He was particularly enthusiastic about the idea of a worldwide sport fishing association headquartered in the United States, and immediately suggested that it might be possible to affiliate such an organization with the Museum. His interest in such an association and the information it could provide to scientists was the beginning of IGFA's lasting connection with scientists and scientific institutions.

When the members of the Australia-New Zealand expedition returned to the U. S., letters were written to outstanding anglers, fishing clubs, and tackle manufacturers soliciting their opinions regarding the formation of an international association of marine angling clubs. The response was highly favorable and on June 7, 1939, the International Game Fish Association was formally launched in a meeting held at the American Museum of Natural History. Present were William King Gregory (who became the first president of the association), Michael Lerner, angler/writer Van Campen Heilner, and Francesca LaMonte, Associate Curator of Fishes for the Museum and science leader of several of the Lerner expeditions.

Another immediate task was to notify scientific institutions and fishing clubs throughout the world about IGFA, its activities and intentions. By January 1940, only a few months after that first meeting, there were two associated scientific institutions, 10 member clubs, and 12 overseas representatives. By 1948, the numbers had grown to 10 scientific institutions, 80 member clubs, and IGFA representatives in 41 areas of the world. Clive Firth of Australia was elected IGFA's first overseas representative, and others were chosen in Nigeria, New Zealand, Bermuda, the Bahamas, Chile, Costa Rica, the Canal Zone, Cuba, Hawaii, Mexico and Puerto Rico. Among the first associated clubs were the Catalina Tuna Club, Miami Beach Rod and Reel Club, Cape Breton Big Game Anglers Association, Long Island Tuna Club, Atlantic City Tuna Club, Freeport Tuna Club, and Beach Haven Tuna Club.

As news of the IGFA spread, other noted sportsmen and scientists were drawn to its administration. Among the early officers were Ernest Hemingway, Philip Wylie, B. David Crowninshield, and Charles M. Breder Jr., who served as Chairman of the Committee on Scientific Activities.

Michael Lerner financed the operations of the International Game Fish Association from its inception, and when Dr. Gregory retired from the Museum staff in 1944, Lerner took over responsibility for the IGFA presidency as well. Since then, William K. Carpenter, Elwood K. Harry, Michael Leech, Rob Kramer, and Jason Schratwieser have served as IGFA presidents. The physical location of IGFA headquarters changed as well through the last six decades: in the late 1950s IGFA moved from New York City to Florida, first to Miami, then in 1967 to Fort Lauderdale, in 1992 to Pompano Beach, and in 1999 to Dania Beach.

However, two of the most significant events affecting the association since 1939 occurred in the 1970s. Early in that decade E. K. Harry, then IGFA vice president, proposed opening the organization to individual membership to insure its continued funding, unify international anglers, and inform a much larger audience of the problems threatening fishery resources. Then, in 1978, Field & Stream magazine officially turned over its record-keeping responsibilities to IGFA. Thus the membership-driven organization that IGFA is today, responsible for all saltwater and freshwater world records and for spreading awareness of fishery and conservation issues to fishermen around the world, was formed.

== See also ==
- Sport Fishing Association (Venezuela)
- Bouncer Smith
