= Hamar Midgley =

Australian ichthyologist (1918–2014)

Stephen Hamar Midgley
- Born: 7 December 1918; Wynnum, Queensland
- Died: 28 September 2014 (aged 95); Bli Bli, Queensland
- Known for: Research on freshwater fish in Queensland, Australia; President of Australian Society for Fish Biology
- Spouse: Mary Midgley
- Awards: Australian Society for Fish Biology Hall of Fame

Stephen Hamar Midgley (7 December 1918 – 28 September 2014) was an Australian ichthyologist. From 1977 to 1979, he served as the third President of the Australian Society for Fish Biology.

== Early life ==
Midgley was born in Wynnum, Queensland on 7 December 1918. In October 1939, he joined the Australian Army and fought overseas during the Second World War, serving with the 7th Division, 2/5th Field Artillery Regiment, first in North Africa and the Middle East and then in New Guinea. Midgley left the Army in 1945 and returned to Queensland, where he became a woodworker and furniture maker. He married his wife Mary in 1942, in Brisbane, Queensland.

== Fish research ==
Beginning in the early 1950s, Midgley became a self-taught expert on Queensland freshwater fishes. His first work was a study of Australian bass (Macquaria novemaculeata) in the Maroochy and Noosa rivers, and he was the first to show that this species was catadromous. In the 1960s, he completed the first official stocking of Australian native fish, releasing southern saratoga (Scleropages leichardti) into Borumba Dam on the Sunshine Coast. Midgley also undertook research on the reproductive behaviour of southern saratoga, on hormone-induced breeding and long-distance transportation of native fish, and on sexing fish using a catheter.

Although Midgley's early research was self-funded, between 1964 and 1994 he worked full-time as a fisheries consultant. Mary often accompanied Midgley on his field trips, which continued as late as 2001. He co-wrote the Field Guide of Freshwater Fishes of Australia, with Gerald R. Allen and Mark Allen. Midgley died on 28 September 2014 in Bli Bli, Queensland.

== Legacy ==
In 1975, Midgley was elected to the American Institute of Fishery Research Biologists, and was granted Emeritus status in 1992. In 1994, he received an Honorary Doctorate of Science from the University of Queensland for his contributions to freshwater fish research. Midgley served as the third President of the Australian Society for Fish Biology from 1977-79, and was later inducted into their Hall of Fame. Vic McCristal, in his book Rivers and the Sea, wrote that: "In northern Australia there are dozens of rivers that most of us have never heard of. They contain huge volumes of fresh water, and what little we do know of them is due to Hamar and his wife Mary." Three fish species were named in his honour: the silver cobbler (Arius midgleyi), Midgley's grunter (Pingalla midgleyi) and Midgley’s carp gudgeon (Hypseleotris sp).
