= Andre Punt =

South African fisheries scientist and mathematician (born 1965)

André Punt
- Born: 1965 (age 60–61); Cape Town, South Africa
- Education: University of Cape Town
- Known for: Mathematical models for fisheries stock assessment
- Awards: K. Radway Allen Award
- Scientific career
- Thesis: Management procedures for Cape hake and baleen whale resources (1991)

André Eric Punt (born February 1965) is a South African fisheries scientist and mathematician, best known for his work on fisheries stock assessment. He received the K. Radway Allen Award in 1999 for his contributions to fisheries science.

== Early years and education ==
André Punt was born in February 1965 in Cape Town, South Africa. He attended the University of Cape Town, where he received a BSc (with Honours) in Computer Science in 1986, an MSc in Applied Mathematics in 1988, and a PhD in Applied Mathematics in 1991. As a PhD student in the late 1980s, Punt and his colleague Doug Butterworth competed in an informal competition against other international research groups to develop computer simulations that could guide quota decisions for whale harvests. Punt and his collaborators went on to produce simulations and formulae that could account for uncertainties in whale abundance data. These approaches were subsequently applied to stock assessments for South Africa's hake, sardine, anchovy and West Coast rock lobster fisheries.

== Career ==
In 1992, after completing his doctoral studies, Punt joined the School of Fisheries at the University of Washington as a research associate. In 1994, he moved to Australia to work as a resource modeller in the CSIRO's Division of Marine Research. Here, his work on stock assessments was influential for Australian fisheries. In 1999, the Australian Society for Fish Biology awarded Punt its K. Radway Allen Award in recognition of his scientific contributions. He later rejoined the University of Washington, in the School of Aquatic and Fishery Sciences where he has received numerous distinguished teaching awards. Punt is known for his international collaborations, particularly his work with the International Whaling Commission and the International Commission for the Conservation of Atlantic Tunas.
