= Julian Pepperell =

Australian marine biologist and author

Julian G. Pepperell
- Known for: Research on marlin, sailfish, tuna, and sharks.
- Scientific career
- Fields: Ichthyology
- Institutions: Pepperell Research and Consulting Pty Ltd

Julian G. Pepperell is an Australian marine biologist and author, and a leading authority on marlin, sailfish, tuna, and sharks.

He is a former president of the Australian Society for Fish Biology (1991–93) and a recipient of the Conservation Award from the International Game Fish Association (1999).

== Published works ==
- Fishes of the Open Ocean: A Natural History and Illustrated Guide (2010) ISBN 978-0-226-65539-0, shortlisted for the Science Writer Award in the 2010 Queensland Premier's Literary Awards.
