= Sport Fishing Association =

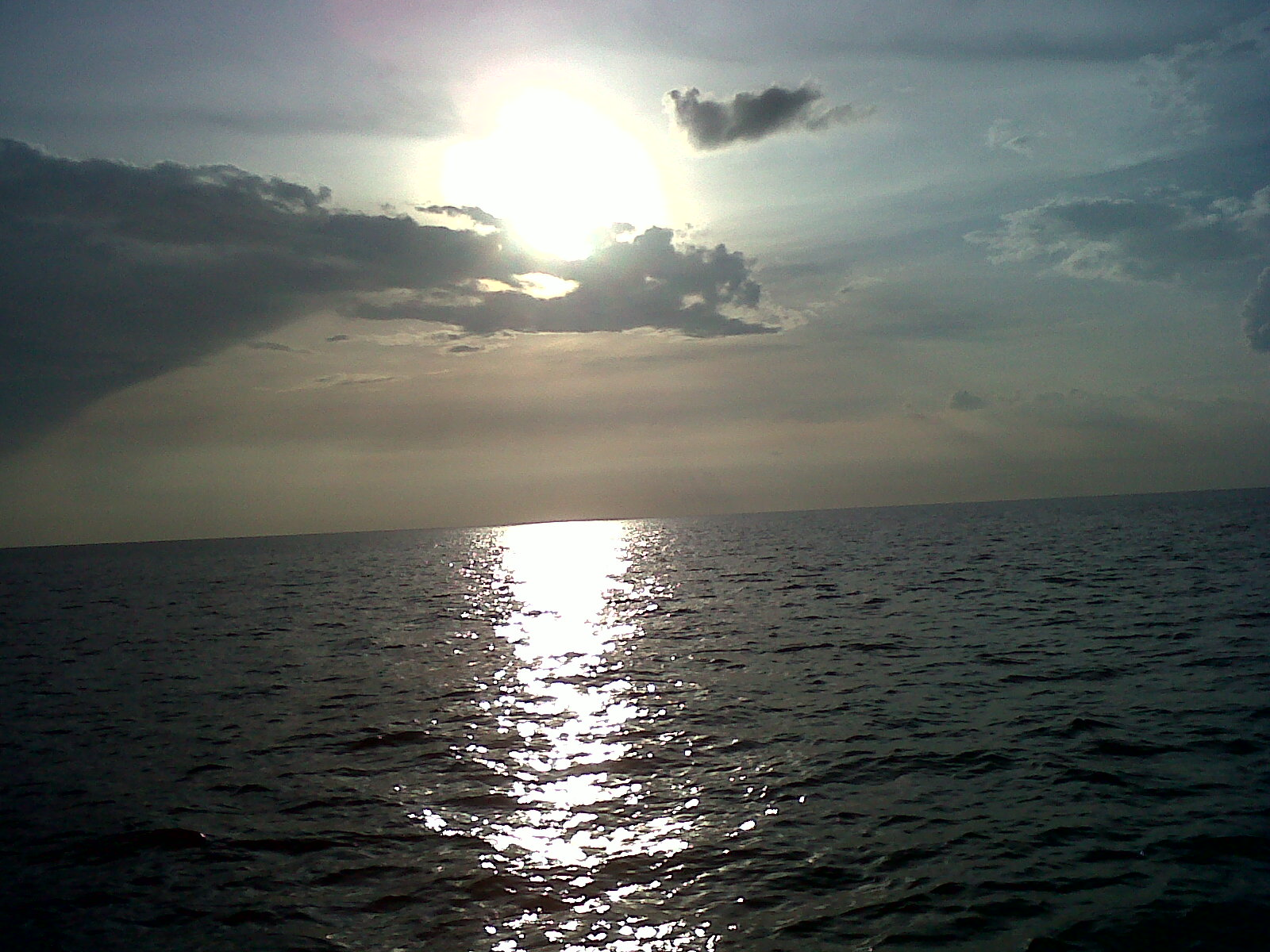
Anzoátegui - Venezuela Sea

The Sport Fishing Association in Anzoátegui (S.F.A.A.) is an organized group of people who practice sport fishing in Venezuela. The S.F.A.A. is the only legally constituted association of fishermen in Venezuela. The members of the association share information about best practices and new techniques, also compete with each other.

It was founded 36 years ago and now organizes more than 10 fishing tournaments each year, ranking as the association that makes more sport fishing events in Latin America.

== History ==
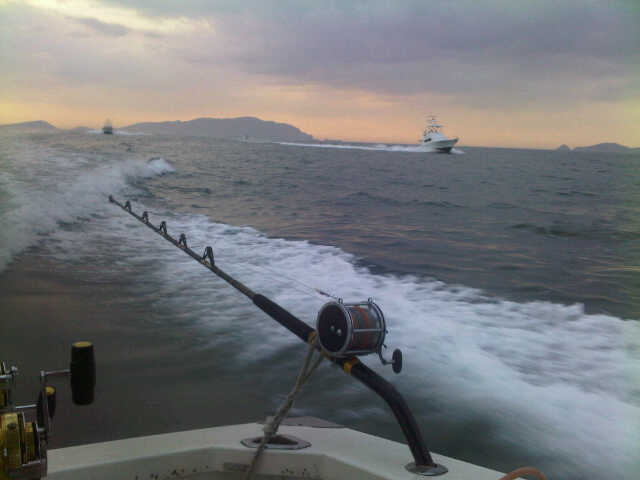
Second fishing tournament in Anzoátegui, Venezuela 2011. Photo taken from the boat Argonauta

Sport Fishing Association in Anzoátegui was founded in June 1975 by professionals fishermen in the state of Anzoátegui.

At the beginning the environment had a lot of fishes billed, however the capture of the fish through the years has become more difficult either by animal behavior or scarcity, as for the scarcity of fish it has been growing dramatically worldwide.

== Present ==
Today sport techniques have changed considerably in terms of technology, boats and sophisticated techniques to protect the environment.

The S.F.A.A. follows the rules imposed by the International Game Fish Association related to the catch and release of animals. The release of the animals is the most important rule in the association, the animals are not caught to not affect the marine fauna.

== Tournaments ==
The association made at least eight sports tournaments at different times of year; the most important is between September and October of each year.

=== Fishing calendar ===
| Tournaments | Date |
|---|---|
| 1 | July-15 |
| 2 | August-12 |
| 3 | September-9 |
| 4 | September-23 |
| 5 | October-14 |
| 6 | October-28 |
| 7 | November-11 |
| 8 | November-11 |
| 9 | December-3 |
