= Australian Society for Fish Biology =

Professional body of fish and fisheries researchers in Australia

- Formation: 1971
- Type: non-profit organisation
- President: Alison King
- Website: www.asfb.org.au

The Australian Society for Fish Biology (ASFB) is a professional organisation of fish and fisheries researchers. Founded in 1971, the society describes itself as a "professional, independent, non-profit, non-commercial and non-aligned organisation." The Australian Society for Fish Biology holds annual conferences for its members, sometimes in partnership with related organisations such as the Oceania Chondrichthyan Society and the Australian Society for Limnology. Former presidents of the society include Hamar Midgley (1977–79), Gerry Allen (1979–81), Julian Pepperell (1991–93) and Bronwyn Gillanders (2012–13).

== History ==
The Australian Society for Fish Biology was founded in mid-1971, with the stated aims to "promote the study of fish and fisheries in Australia, and to provide a communications medium for Australian fish workers". The society had a founding membership of 79 fisheries researchers and managers from eastern Australia and Tasmania. Membership fees were initially $2 per year, but this was scaled back to $1 in 1973, as the society's income in its first two years ($246) far exceeded expenditure ($15). The Australian Society for Fish Biology held its first conference in 1974, in Tewantin, Queensland, in partnership with the Australian Society for Limnology and the Australian Marine Sciences Association. (Note: Some sources describe the 1975 conference in Port Stephens as the society's first, perhaps because the 1974 conference was held in partnership with other organisations.) Since then, the annual conference has been held in all major Australian states and territories, as well as New Zealand in 2003 and 2013. In 2000, the society had 535 members from 17 countries. As of July 2019, the society had 438 members, with more than a third of these students.

== Conferences ==
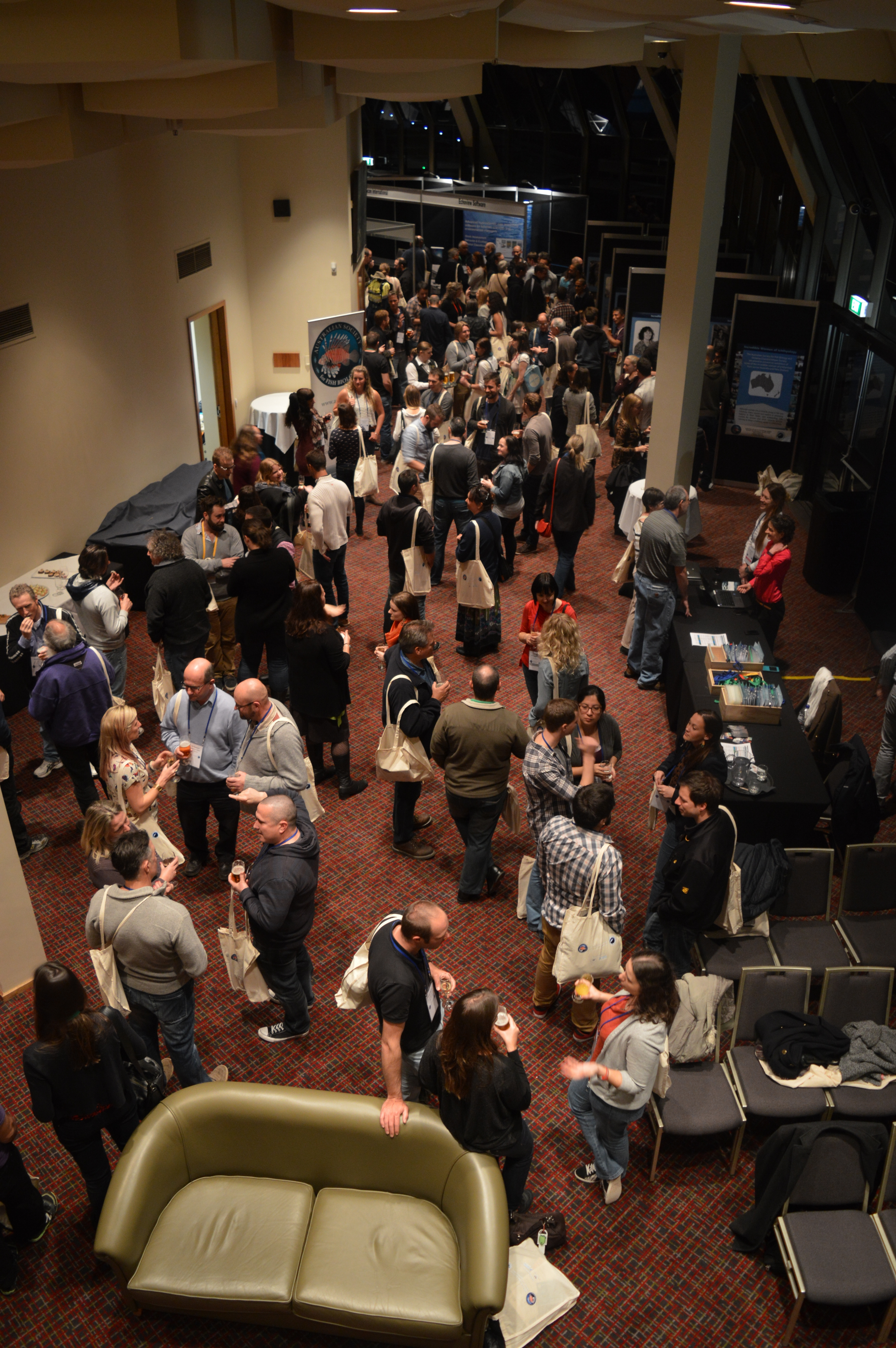
An evening event as part of the 2016 ASFB conference in Hobart, Tasmania

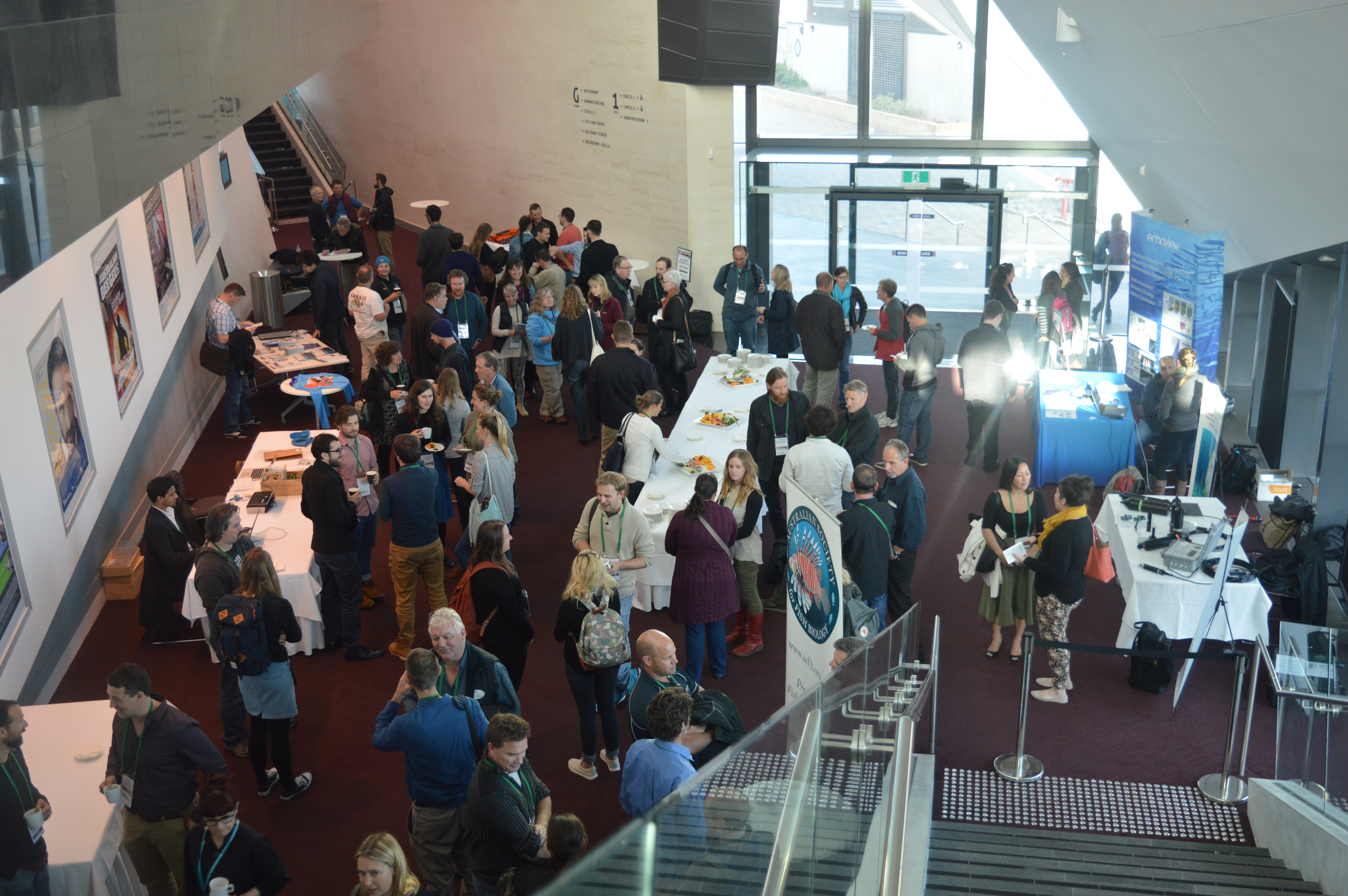
Delegates mingle during a tea break at the 2017 ASFB conference in Albany, Western Australia

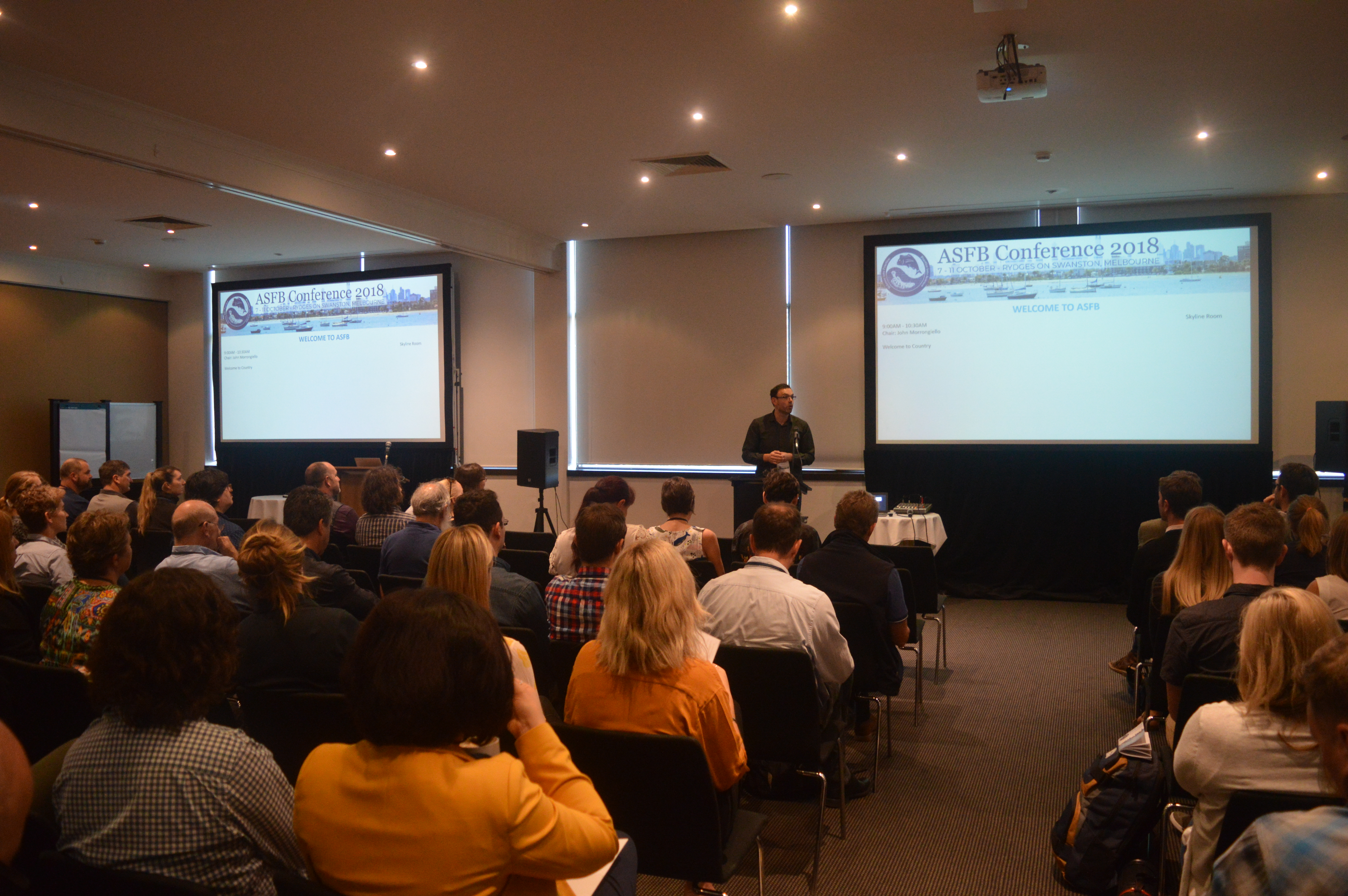
John Morrongiello opens the 2018 ASFB conference in Melbourne

Conferences have been held annually in Australia or New Zealand since 1974, sometimes in partnership with related organisations such as the Oceania Chondrichthyan Society and the Australian Society for Limnology. In 1974, the first ASFB conference was held in Tewantin, Queensland. This location was chosen due to its close proximity to the estuarine system of the Noosa Lakes, which aligned with the meeting's estuarine theme.

In 1975, the 2nd ASFB conference was held at the NSW Brackish Water Fish Culture Research Station at Port Stephens, New South Wales, and was attended over two days by 60 members. This conference generated a profit of $200. The 3rd ASFB conference was held in Lakes Entrance, Victoria over the weekend of 18–19 September 1976, although some presentations on the Saturday afternoon were poorly attended due to the 1976 VFL Grand Final.

The ASFB conference first took place in Tasmania, at Westside Hotel in Hobart, in 1982. In 1986, Darwin hosted the first ASFB conference in the Northern Territory, chaired by John Glaister and attended by 160 members. For the first time, concurrent sessions were introduced to cope with the increasing number of conference presentations. The conference dinner took place at the sailing club on Fannie Bay, with the fancy dress theme "Come as your Taxon". The first South Australian conference was held the following year, at Victor Harbor, South Australia.

The 1989 conference, held on Magnetic Island, Queensland, was almost cancelled due to a pilots' dispute that grounded all domestic commercial airlines. Many delegates flew to Townsville aboard a RAAF Hercules troop carrier aircraft that had been put into temporary service by the Government. Other delegates drove the thousands of kilometres to Townsville from their home cities. In total, 105 of the 140 registered delegates made it to the conference, "demonstrat[ing] ASFB members’ determination to confer about fish at all costs."

The first Western Australian conference took place in 1993, at the Sorrento Quay Function Centre. The 1996 conference in Brisbane was subsumed by the 2nd World Fisheries Congress, which was hosted by ASFB and included 950 delegates from 66 countries at the Brisbane Convention & Exhibition Centre. In 2003, the conference was held for the first time in New Zealand, hosted by Victoria University of Wellington. The ASFB conference mascot is a stuffed toy called "The Duck", which appears annually at the conference dinner, from at least as early as 2004.

Alongside their 2018 conference in Melbourne, the ASFB held an online public vote, in collaboration with Lateral magazine, to decide "Australia's favourite fish". The competition received nearly 1,200 votes, with the leafy seadragon (Phycodurus eques) named Australia's favourite species, with 132 votes.

List of ASFB annual conferences: (Note: Conference locations up to 2014 are cited in Rowling (2014).)

- Tewantin (1974) (Note: Joint conference with the Australian Society for Limnology and the Australian Marine Sciences Association.)
- Port Stephens (1975)
- Lakes Entrance (1976)
- Coffs Harbour (1977)
- Victor Harbor (1978)
- Port Stephens (1979)
- Cowes (1980)
- Brisbane (1981)
- Hobart (1982)
- Narrandera (1983)
- Glenelg (1984)
- Melbourne (1985)
- Darwin (1986)
- Canberra (1987)
- Sydney (1988)
- Magnetic Island (1989)
- Lorne (1990)
- Hobart (1991)
- Victor Harbor (1992)
- Sorrento (1993)
- Canberra (1994)
- Sydney (1995)
- Brisbane (1996) (Note: Held as part of the 2nd World Fisheries Congress.)
- Darwin (1997)
- Hobart (1998)
- Bendigo (1999)
- Albury (2000)
- Bunbury (2001)
- Cairns (2002)
- Wellington (2003)
- Glenelg (2004)
- Darwin (2005)
- Hobart (2006)
- Canberra, (2007)
- Bondi Beach (2008)
- Fremantle (2009)
- Melbourne (2010)
- Cairns (2011)
- Adelaide (2012) (Note: Joint conference with the Oceania Chondrichthyan Society.)
- Hamilton (2013) (Note: Joint conference with the New Zealand Freshwater Sciences Society and the New Zealand Marine Sciences Society.)
- Darwin (2014) (Note: Joint conference with the Australian Society for Limnology.)
- Sydney (2015)
- Hobart (2016) (Note: Joint conference with the Oceania Chondrichthyan Society.)
- Albany (2017)
- Melbourne (2018)
- Canberra (2019)
- Virtual conference (2020) (Note: The society's first virtual conference. This event featured student presentations only, and was organised to replace the postponed 8th World Fisheries Congress.)
- Adelaide (2021) (Note: Virtual event, held as part of the 8th World Fisheries Congress. The congress was originally scheduled for 2020 as an in-person event, but delayed due to the COVID-19 pandemic.)

Since 1985, many conferences have been accompanied by workshops on specific topics. The society also hosts four committees that meet annually, usually at the conferences: the Alien Fishes Committee, Education Committee, Fisheries Management Committee, and Threatened Fishes Committee.

The Australian Society for Fish Biology is a founding member of the World Council of Fisheries Societies. It hosted the 1996 World Fisheries Congress in Brisbane and the 2021 World Fisheries Congress (based in Adelaide but held as a virtual event). (Note: The 8th World Fisheries Congress was originally scheduled for 2020, but was postponed for one year due to the global COVID-19 pandemic.)

== Threatened Fishes Committee ==
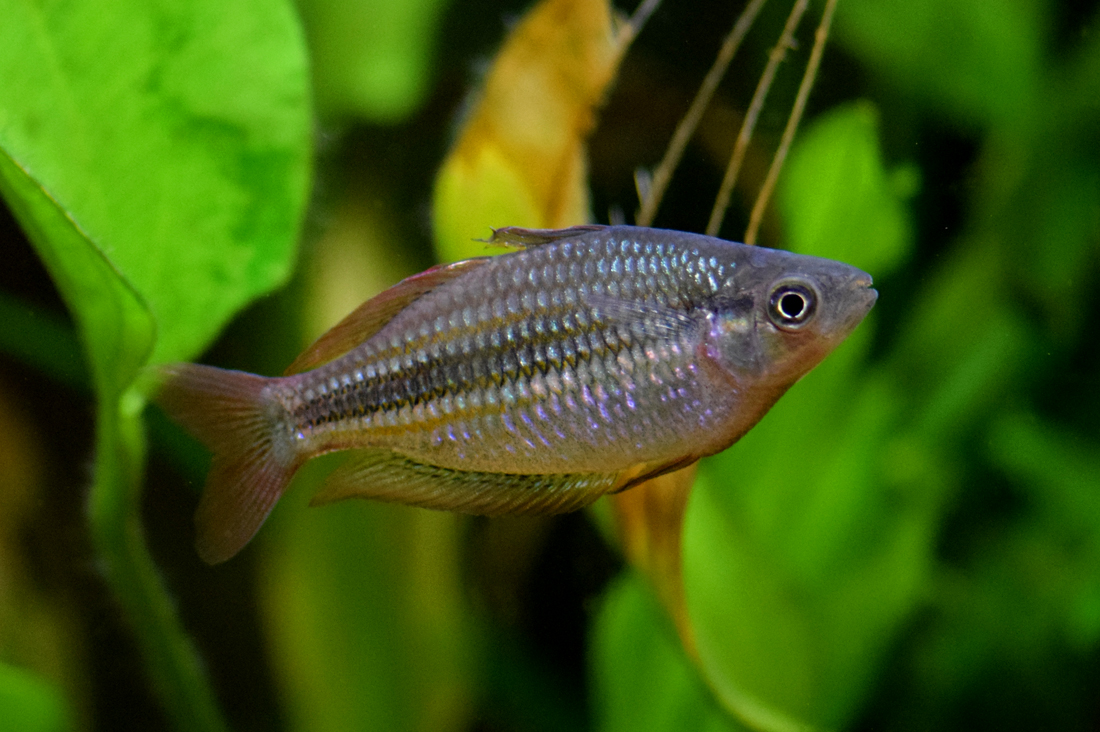
The Lake Eacham rainbowfish, Melanotaenia eachamensis, was classified as Endangered in the ASFB's 1989 listings.

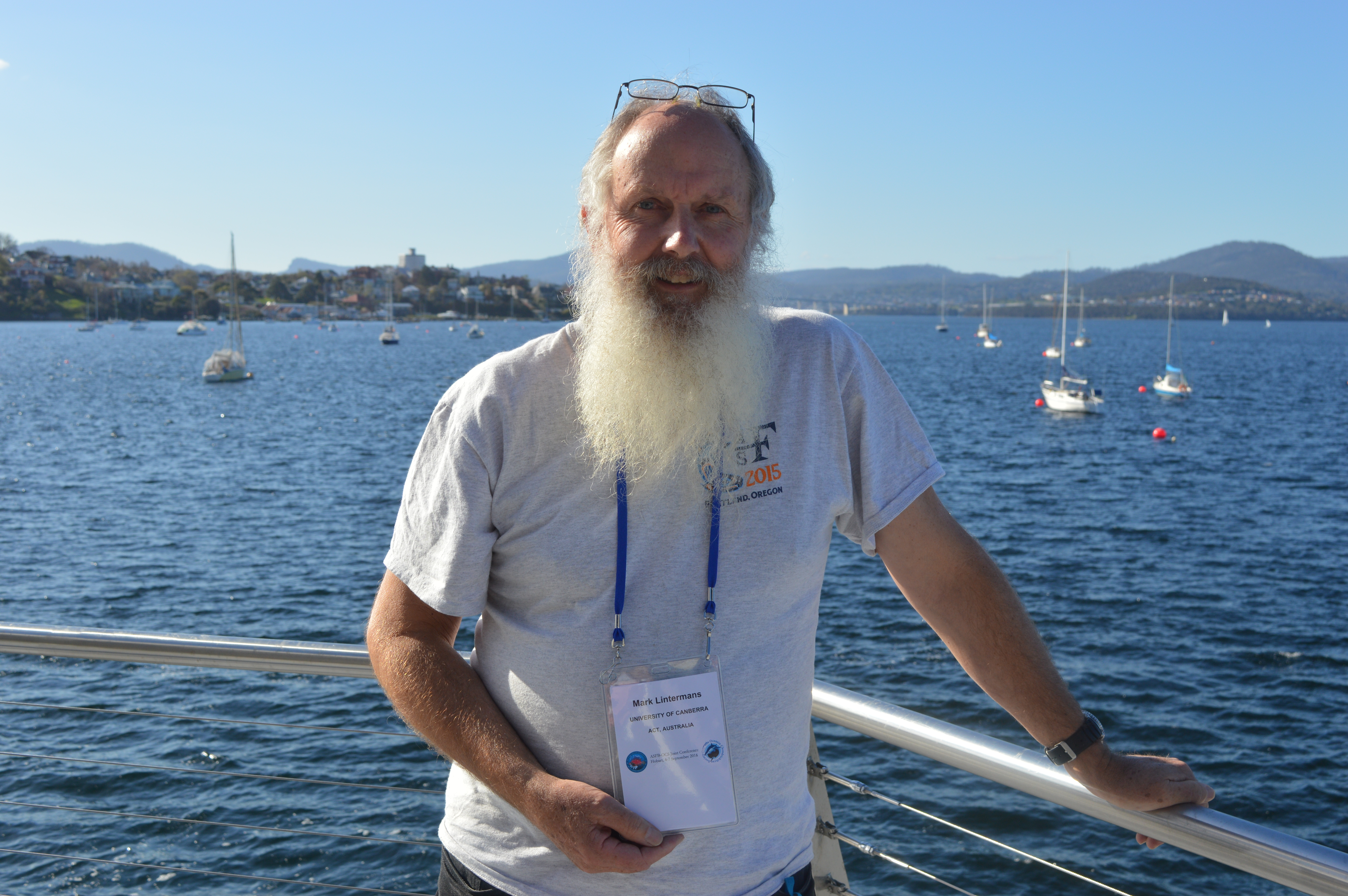
Mark Lintermans, former ASFB President (2005–07) and long-time convener of its Threatened Fishes Committee.

=== History of the committee ===
In 1985, the Australian Society for Fish Biology held a two-day conference workshop in Melbourne to discuss Australia's threatened fishes. The attendees developed a set of conservation status categories and criteria, and listed 59 species in total. A Threatened Species Committee was established two years later, at the 1987 conference; the first threatened fishes list was published that same year. Since 1988, these conservation listings have been updated annually. In 1991, members of the society endorsed a formal nomination process for listing or delisting species. Since 1997, the committee have assessed species against criteria used by the International Union for Conservation of Nature (IUCN). The committee includes scientific representatives from all Australian states and territories.

=== Species classifications ===
In the 1985–89 listings, species were classified as one of the following:

- Extinct (Note: "Taxa which are no longer found in the wild or in a domesticated state.")
- Endangered (Note: "Taxa which have suffered a population decline over all or most of their range, whether the causes of this decline are known or not, and which are in danger of extinction in the near future. (Special management measures are required if these taxa are to continue to survive.)")
- Vulnerable (Note: "Taxa not presently endangered but which are at risk by having small populations and/or by occupying restricted habitats susceptible to rapid environmental change and/or populations which are declining at a rate that would render them endangered in the near future. (Special management measures are required to prevent these taxa becoming endangered or extinct.)")
- Potentially threatened (Note: "Taxa which could become vulnerable or endangered in the near future because: (1) although they may have a relatively large population this is restricted to a small area; (2) they have small populations restricted to a few areas; (3) they have been heavily depleted and are continuing to decline; or (4) they are dependent on a specific habitat for their survival. (Monitoring is required.)")
- Indeterminate (Note: "Taxa which are likely to fall into the endangered, vulnerable or potentially threatened categories but for which insufficient data are available to make an assessment. (Investigation is required).")
- Restricted (Note: "Taxa which are not presently in danger but which occur in restricted areas, or which have suffered a long term reduction in distribution and/or abundance and are now uncommon.")
- Uncertain status (Note: "Taxa whose taxonomy, distribution and/or abundance are uncertain, but which are suspected of being restricted.")

These classifications have been used by the IUCN to inform their own Red List, and by Environment Australia to develop their "Action Plan for Australian freshwater fishes." In August 2019, the ASFB's national threatened species list contained 61 freshwater fish species, compared to 38 listed under the Australian Government's Environment Protection and Biodiversity Conservation Act 1999.

== Newsletter ==
The ASFB publishes a newsletter twice annually. In 2017, the newsletter was renamed Lateral Lines following an online competition; the winning name was contributed by former President Chris Fulton.

== Awards ==
In 1976, the society introduced the first of several conference awards: the Gilbert P. Whitley Memorial Student Award was given for the best paper presented by a student. The winning student, C.M. MacDonald, received a prize of $50. As of 2017, this prize is sponsored by the Fisheries Research and Development Corporation and is worth $600 in both the 'junior' and 'senior' student categories. (Note: The Gilbert P. Whitley Memorial Student Award was split into these two categories in 1991.) The society also awards the John Glover Travel Fund, which was introduced in 1983 as the Student Travel Award, to fund students to attend the conference; and the John Lake Poster Awards, which debuted in 1987. In 1986, the society instigated the humorous Donald D. Francois award to celebrate "an outstanding contribution to fish biology"; the winner received a dozen bottles of red wine from Francois' winery in the Hunter Valley.

=== K. Radway Allen Award ===
The K. Radway Allen Award is awarded by the society "for an outstanding contribution in fish or fisheries science." The award, which may be given annually, is intended to celebrate research conducted primarily in Australia, although not necessarily by a member of the society. The award is named in honour of fisheries biologist Kenneth Radway Allen.

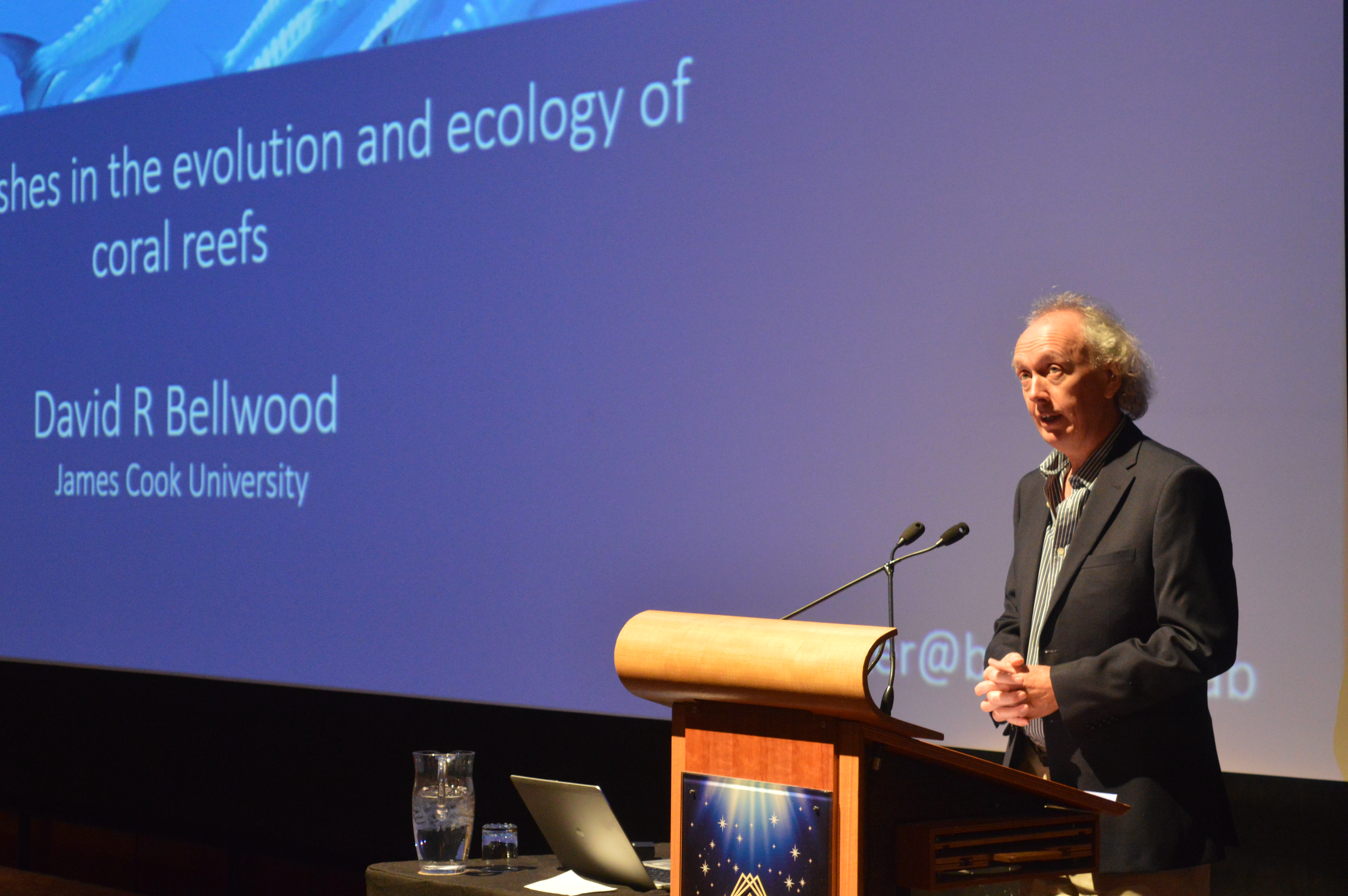
David Bellwood, who received the K. Radway Allen Award in 2015.

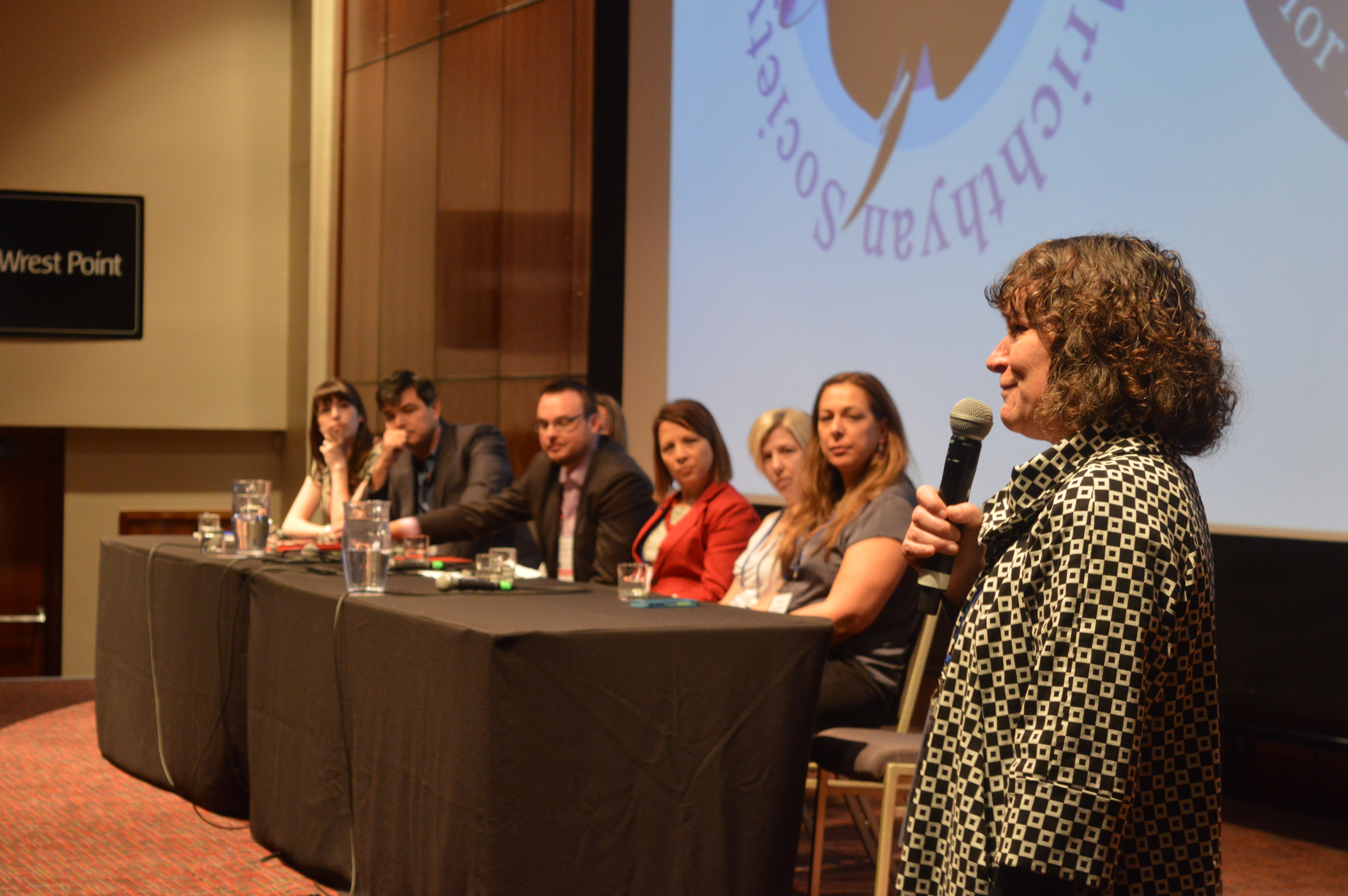
Bronwyn Gillanders (right), who received the K. Radway Allen Award in 2016.

Year	Recipient
1995	Peter C. Young
1997	John Paxton
1999	Andre Punt
2003	Gerry Allen
2005	Norm Hall
2008	Jeff Leis
2009	Peter Last
2011	Rod Lenanton
2013	John Stevens
2015	David Bellwood
2016	Bronwyn Gillanders
2017	Michael Kingsford
2018	Alistair Hobday
2019	Beth Fulton
2021	Gretta Pecl

== Presidents ==
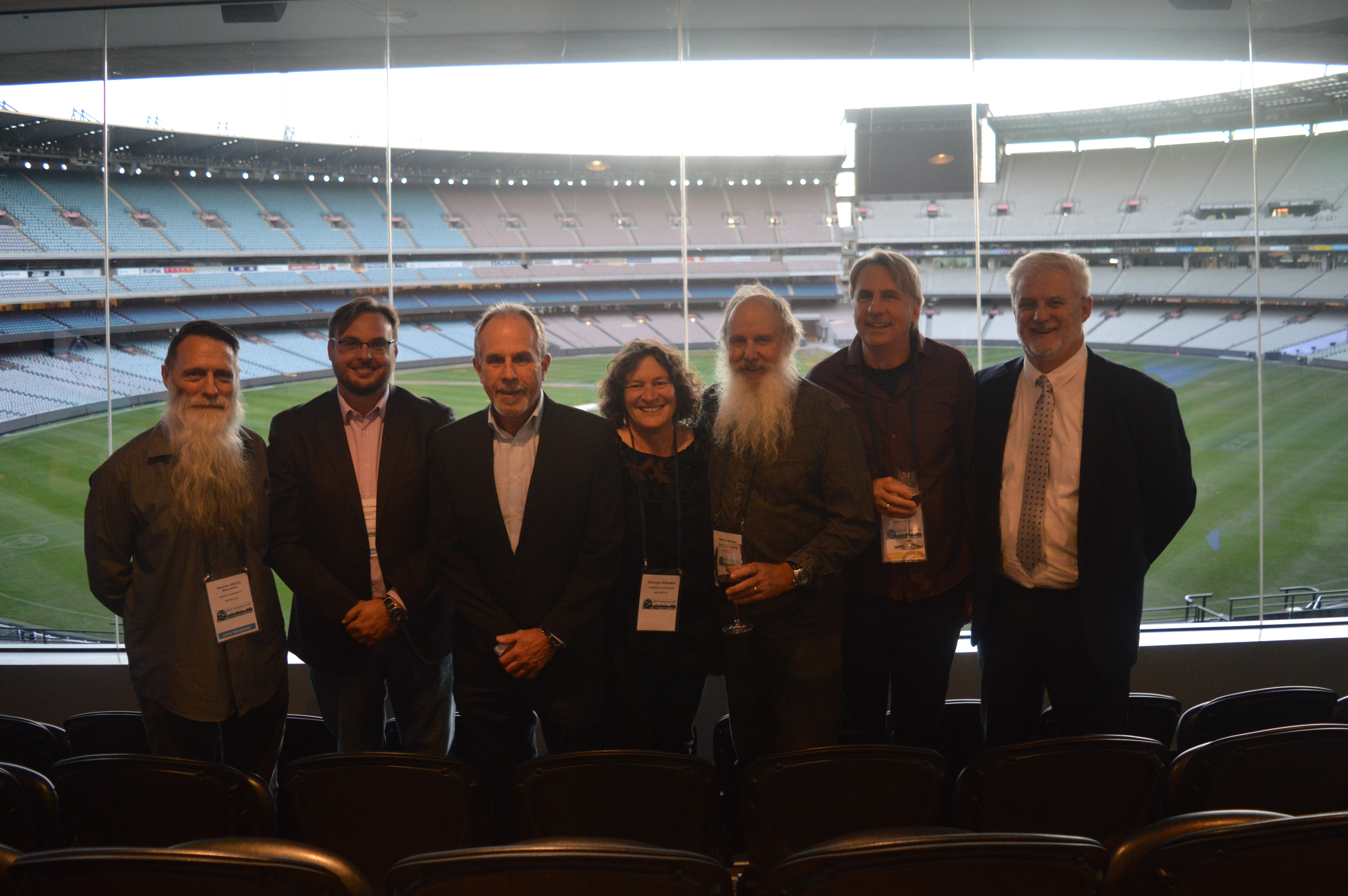
Seven current and former ASFB Presidents in 2018. Left to right: Harry Balcombe, Chris Fulton, Gary Jackson, Bronwyn Gillanders, Mark Lintermans, John Koehn and Andrew Sanger.

Presidents of the ASFB generally serve two-year terms. Former presidents of the society include Hamar Midgley (1977–79), Gerry Allen (1979–81), Julian Pepperell (1991–93) and Bronwyn Gillanders (2012–13).

List of ASFB Presidents

Year	President
1971	John S. Lake
1972	Gilbert P. Whitley
1973	Doug F. Hoese
1974–75	W.B. Malcolm
1975	Jim Wharton
1976–77	John Paxton
1977–79	Hamar Midgley
1979–81	Gerry Allen
1981–83	Richard Tilzey
1983–85	Dave Pollard
1985–87	Phil Cadwallader
1987–89	John Glover
1989–91	John Glaister
1991–93	Julian Pepperell
1993–95	David Smith
1995–97	Peter C. Young
1997–99	Pat Dixon
1999–2001	Andrew Sanger
2001–03	John Koehn
2003–05	Dan Gaughan
2005–07	Mark Lintermans
2007–09	Patrick Coutin
2010–11	Jeremy Lyle
2012–13	Bronwyn Gillanders
2013–15	Gary Jackson
2015–17	Chris Fulton
2017–19	Stephen "Harry" Balcombe
2019–21	Alison King
2021–23	Gretchen Grammer

=== Gallery ===
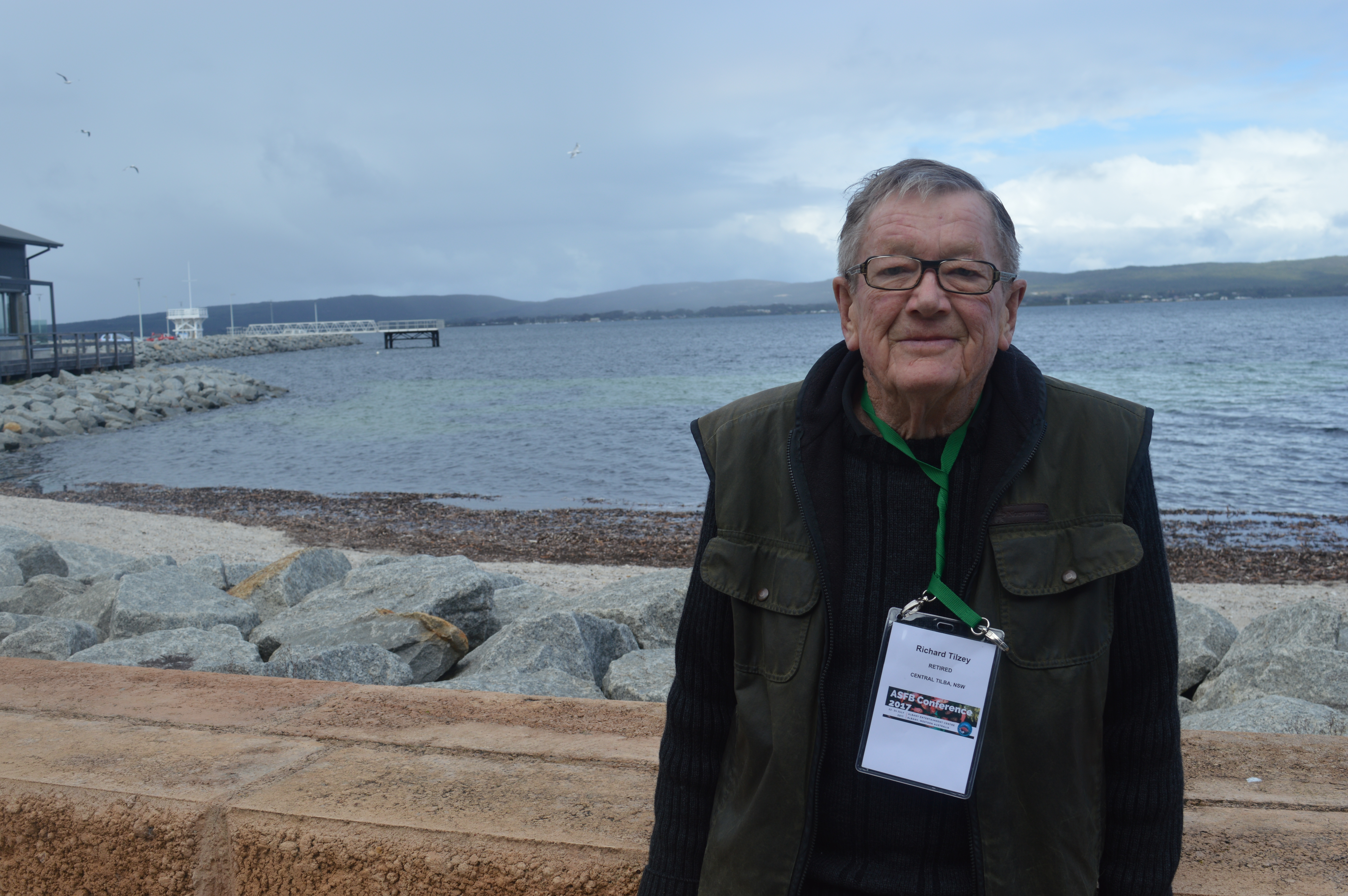
Richard Tilzey, ASFB President from 1981 to 1983.

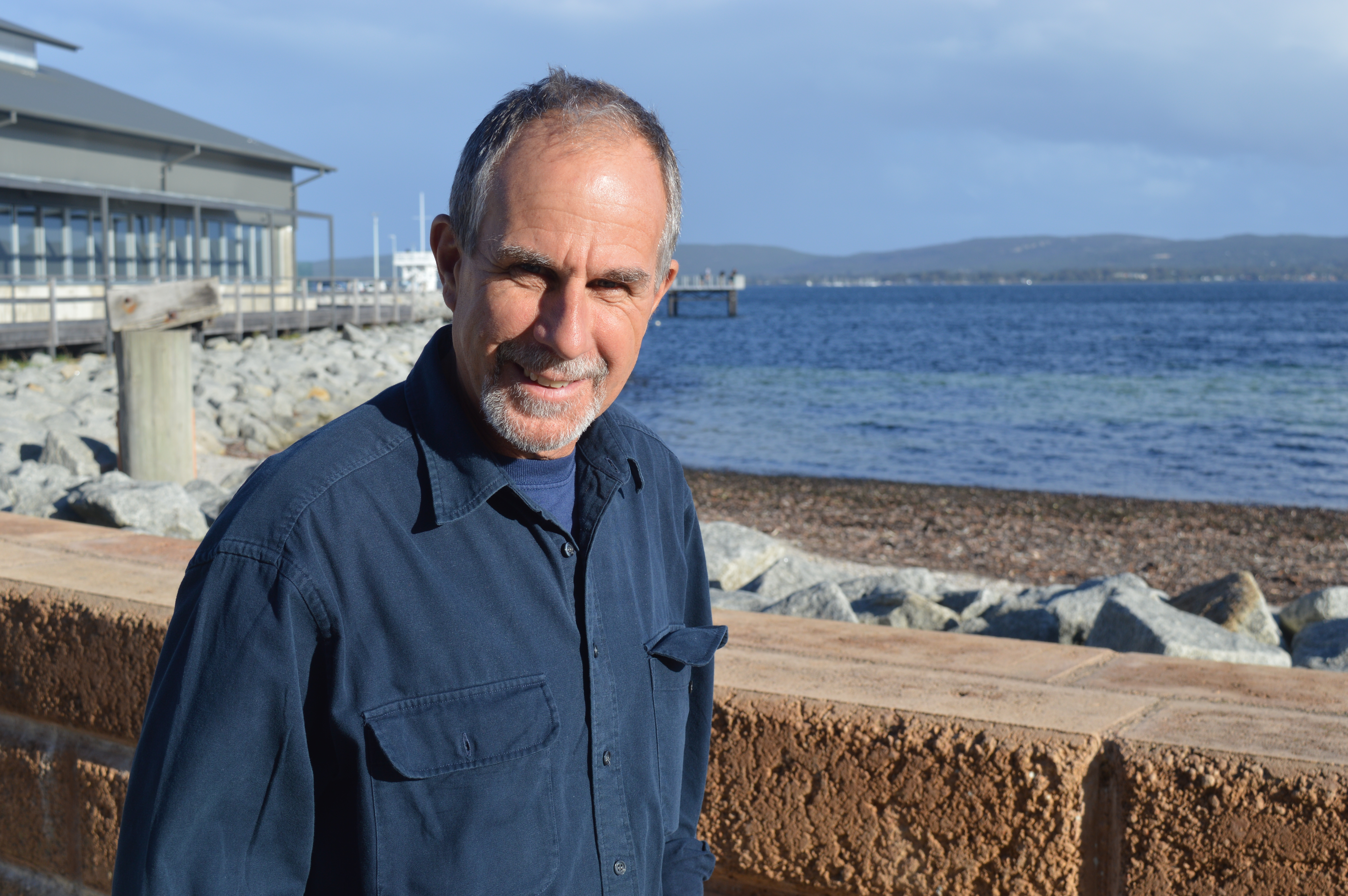
Gary Jackson, ASFB President from 2013 to 2015.

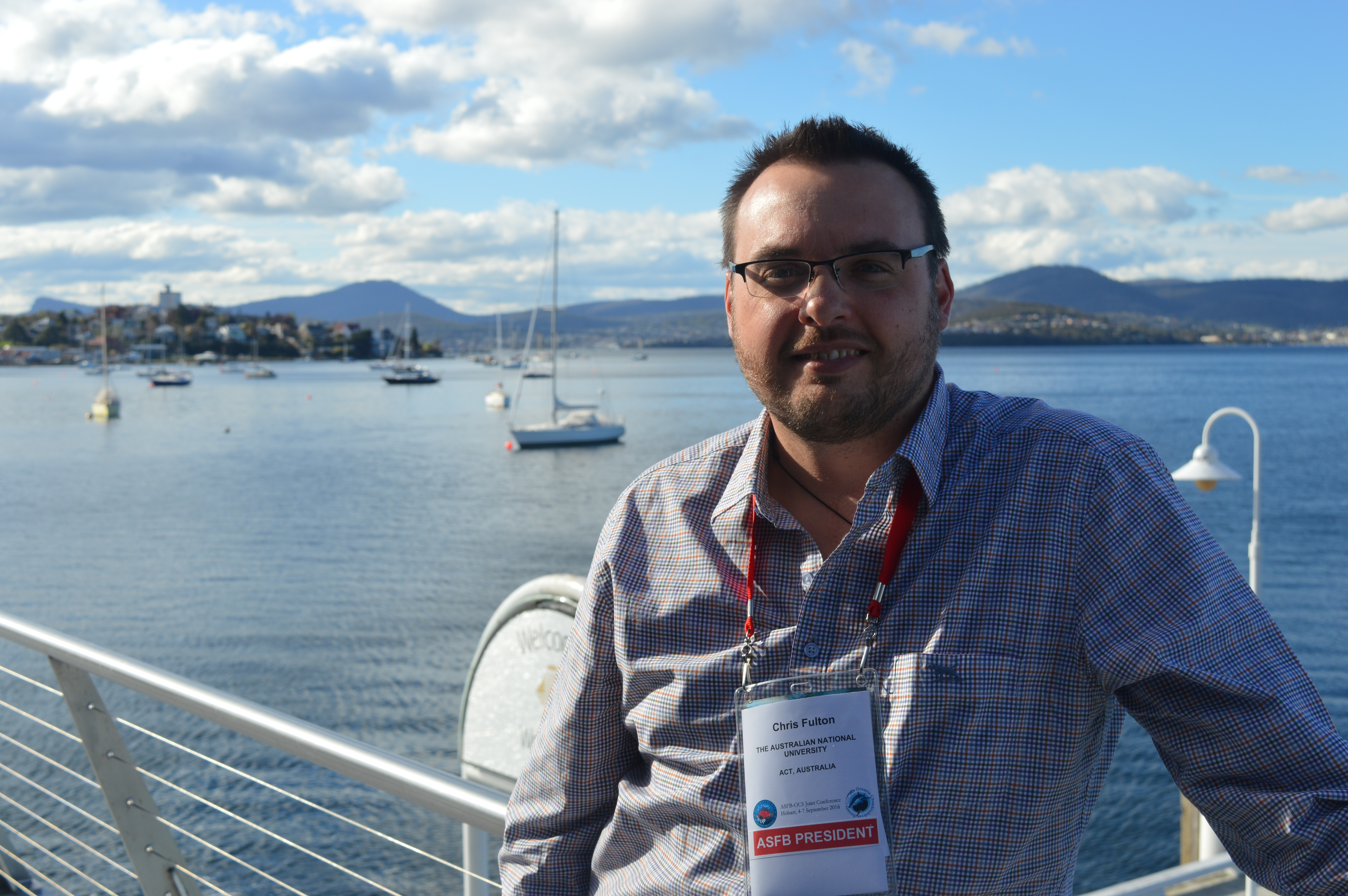
Chris Fulton, ASFB President from 2015 to 2017.

== See also ==
- World Council of Fisheries Societies
