= Bronwyn Gillanders =

Marine scientist

Bronwyn Gillanders FTSE
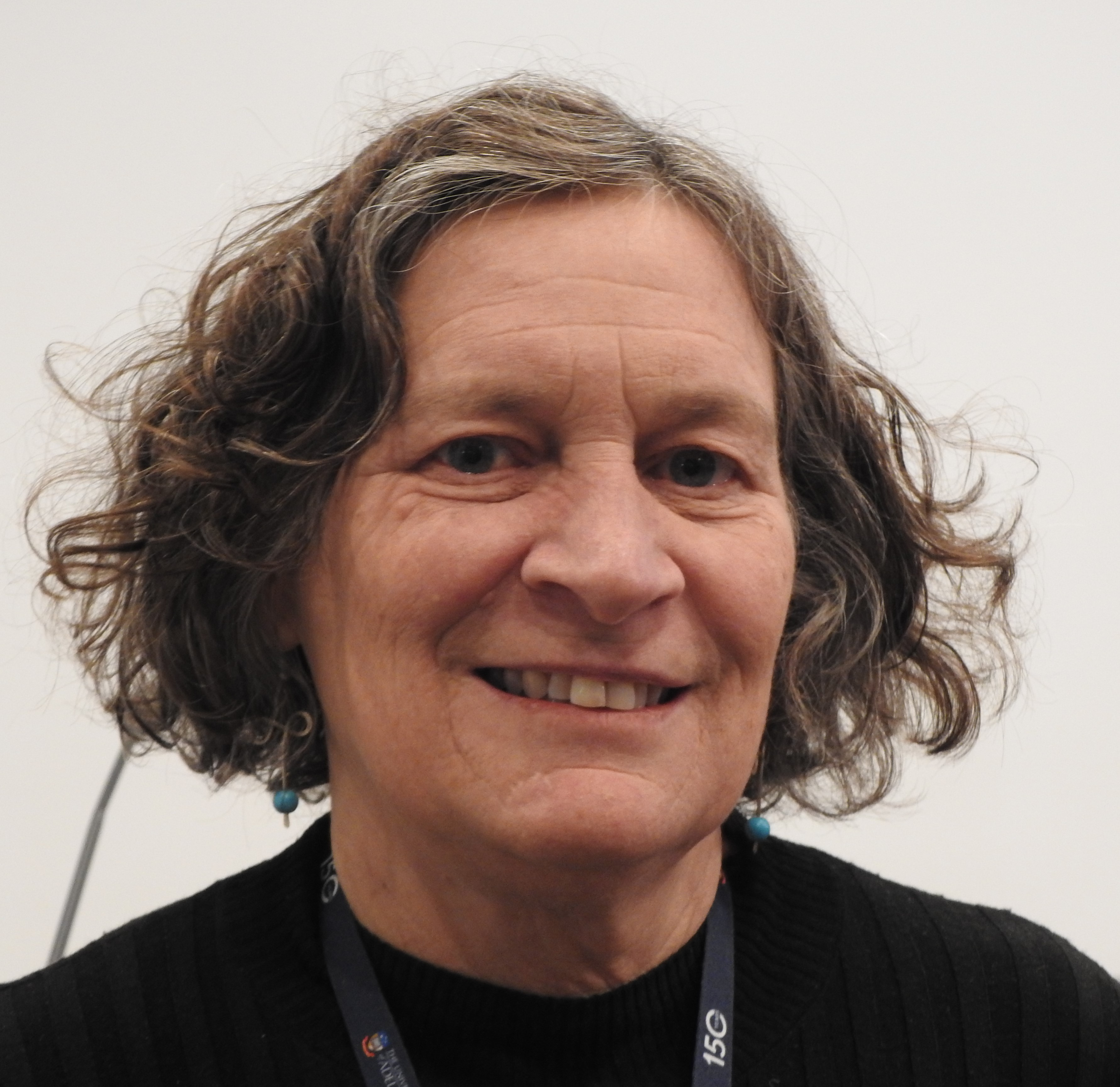
- Bronwyn Gillanders in 2025
- Born: Bronwyn May Gillanders
- Education: University of Sydney
- Known for: Research on fish and fisheries ecology
- Scientific career
- Fields: Marine ecology
- Workplaces: University of Adelaide
- Thesis: Links between estuarine and coastal reef populations of Achoerodus viridis (Pisces:Labridae) (1995)
- Website: http://www.gillanderslab.org/

Bronwyn May Gillanders FTSE is a marine scientist whose research spans freshwater, estuarine and marine waters while focusing on fish and fisheries ecology. Her studies of the Giant Australian cuttlefish of Northern Spencer Gulf in South Australia revealed the species' sensitivity to increases in salinity; a controversial aspect of the Environmental Impact Study (EIS) for the expansion of BHP's Olympic Dam mine. Gillanders' discovery was published in the scientific journal Marine Environmental Research and prompted environmental activists to call for the relocation of the project's proposed seawater desalination plant at Point Lowly, due to its proximity to the only mass breeding area for the animals' genetically distinct population. Gillanders commenced work at the University of Adelaide in 2001, received a tenurable position in 2007 and was appointed professor in 2010. She is the Director of the Marine Biology program at the university's Environment Institute.

== Education ==
Gillanders completed her Bachelor of Science at the University of Canterbury, Masters of Science at the University of Otago and a PhD at the University of Sydney.

== Early career ==
After completing her PhD in Sydney, Australia, Gillanders worked at New South Wales Fisheries on yellowtail kingfish age, growth and reproductive biology. She then returned to the University of Sydney on an Australian Research Council (ARC) Postdoctoral Fellowship where her research was focused on population replenishment and connectivity of fish between estuarine and coastal areas.

== Spencer Gulf Ecosystem and Development Initiative ==
Gillanders is currently the Director of the Spencer Gulf Ecosystem and Development Initiative which as of 2014 is in the early stages of developing an integrated management system for Spencer Gulf's environment and its industrial users. The initiative is led by the University of Adelaide's Environment Institute, in partnership with a number of industrial interests and government agencies. Partners include resource and energy companies BHP, Santos, Alinta, Arrium Mining, Centrex Metals, Nyrstar and port operator, Flinders Ports. Public sector partners include the Fisheries Research and Development Corporation and Marine Innovation SA collaborators South Australian Research and Development Institute (SARDI) and Flinders University.

Gillanders' research work within the initiative includes further studies of giant Australian cuttlefish and of shipping activity within Spencer Gulf. The latter work is a response to concerns about the translocation of exotic species into gulf waters which support lucrative wild-catch fishery and sea cage aquaculture industries.

Gillanders has described the initiative as having the potential to "be a model for sustainable development around the world."

== Political views ==
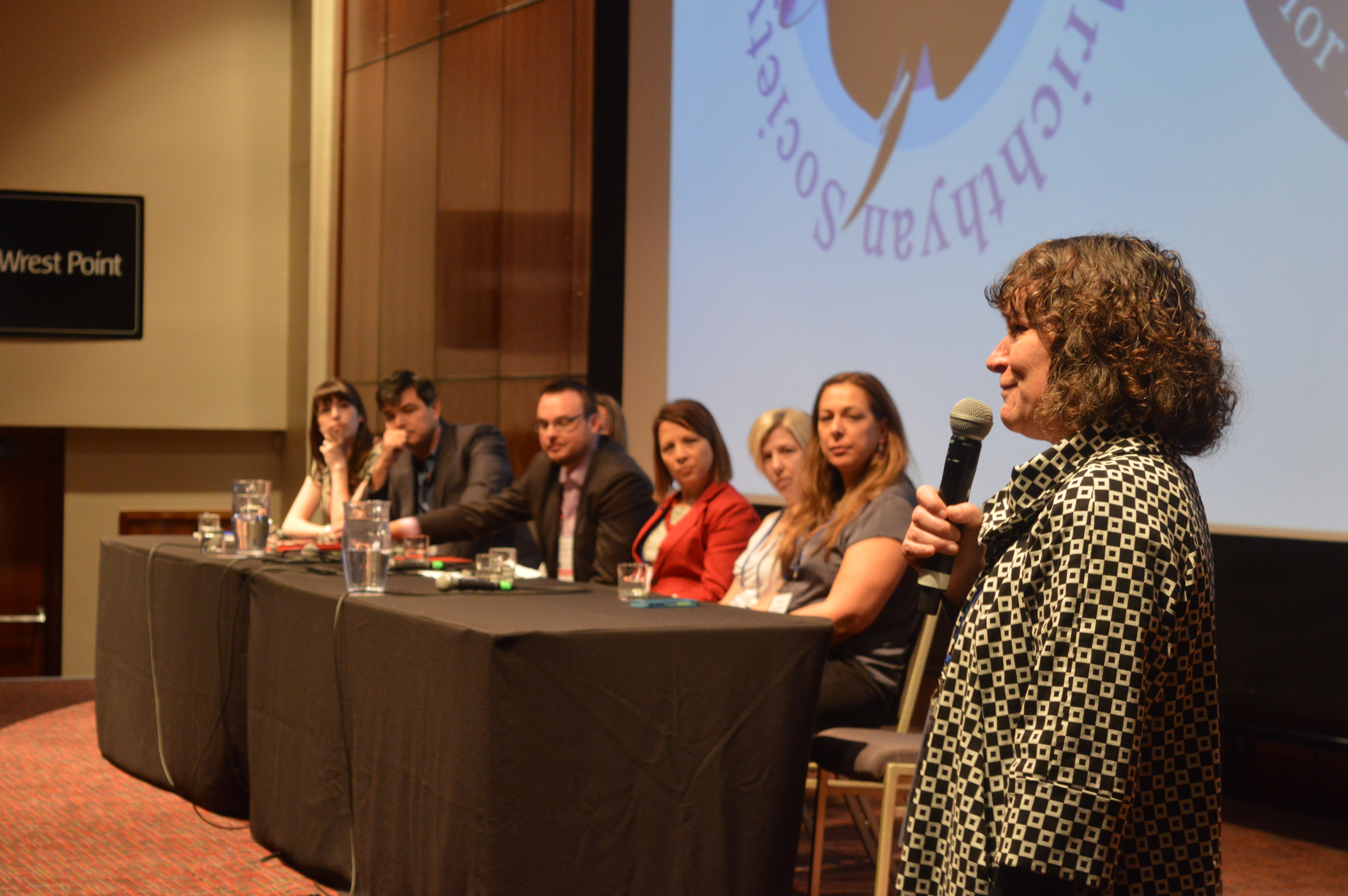
Gillanders (right) leads a gender equity forum at the 2016 joint conference of the Australian Society for Fish Biology and Oceania Chrondrichthyan Society.

Gillanders believes that the environment and industrial expansion can coexist in Spencer Gulf. In 2011 she commented: "I used to think it was either the environment or industrial development, that you couldn't have both... but I think we've moved beyond that now, I just think that we can mesh both together such that we get positive outcomes for both the environment and the industry."

== Publications ==
Gillanders' work has been published in a number of scientific journals, including Marine and Freshwater Research, Journal of Animal Ecology, Reviews in Fish Biology & Fisheries and BioScience. Gillanders' also co-edited the text book Marine Ecology with her partner and fellow environmental scientist, Sean D. Connell. The book was authored by a group of prominent Australian and New Zealand scientists and published by Oxford University Press in 2007.

== Awards and recognition ==
Gillanders was President of the Australian Society for Fish Biology from 2012 to 2013. In 2016, she received the K. Radway Allen Award, the highest honour awarded by the society. She was elected a Fellow of the Australian Academy of Technological Sciences and Engineering (FTSE) in 2023.
