= Stock assessment =

Process used in fisheries management

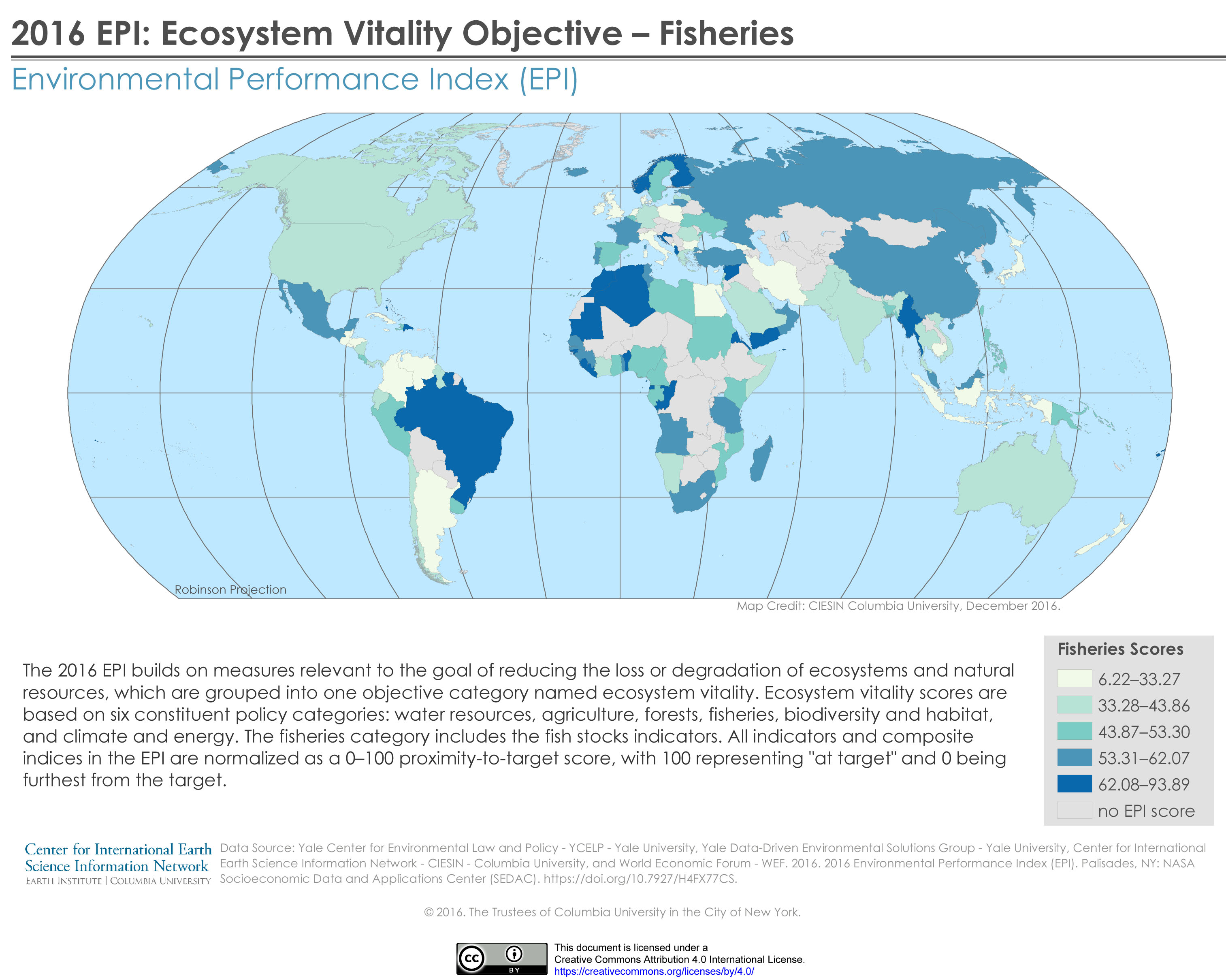
Fish stocks indicators, which is normalized as a 0–100 proximity-to-target score, with 100 representing "at target" and 0 being furthest from the target.

Stock assessments provide fisheries managers with the information that is used in the regulation of a fish stock. Biological and fisheries data are collected in a stock assessment.

A wide array of biological data may be collected for an assessment. These include details on the age structure of the stock, age at first spawning, fecundity, ratio of males to females in the stock, natural mortality (M), fishing mortality (F), growth rate of the fish, spawning behavior, critical habitats, migratory habits, food preferences, and an estimate of either the total population or total biomass of the stock.

The following data regarding fisheries activities is collected: the kinds of fisherman in the fishery, commercial versus recreational, and the gear that is used (longline, rod and reel, nets, etc.), pounds of fish caught by each type of fisherman, the fishing effort each kind of fisherman expends, the age structure of the fish harvested by each group of fisherman, the ratio of males to females that are captured, how the fish are marketed, the value of the fish to the different fisherman groups, and the time and geographic location of the best catches. Also in the assessment, geographical boundaries of different stocks or populations are defined. From the combined biological and fisheries data, the current status and condition of the stock is defined and managers use this assessment to predict how in the future, stocks will respond to varying levels of fishing pressure. Ultimately managers want to reduce the level of overfishing that occurs and restore stocks that have been overfished.

== Defining stock ==
In fisheries management, stock refers to a harvested or managed unit of a fish. Typically stocks are divided based on geographical location and not based on individual population. Spanish mackerel are distributed from Maine to the Yucatan Peninsula in Mexico. They are divided into two stocks, based on whether they migrate northward along the eastern United States coast or if they migrate into the Gulf of Mexico. Each stock of Spanish mackerel does not represent discrete populations. Stocks are not always composed of a single species. Stocks can be composed of multiple species due to their being harvested together or as a form of convenience for managers. An example of a multispecies stock is river herring. Alewives and blueback herring are labeled as river herring for management purposes due to their similar physical appearances and being harvested together. Individuals within a stock are subdivided into cohorts. A cohort is a group of fish born in the same year within a population or stock.

== Gathering data ==
Data used in stock assessments can be classified as fishery-dependent data or fishery-independent data. Fishery-dependent data is collected from the fishery itself, using both commercial and recreational sources. There are a variety of methods for obtaining fishery-dependent data. The most common approach is to use recorded landings. Landings are a record of the amount of fish sold and the numbers are typically reported in total weight. Another common mode for acquiring fishery-dependent data is through portside sampling of the catch of both recreational and commercial fisherman to obtain age and length information on the stock. Other less common methods for obtaining data is through the use of onboard observers, self-reporting, telephone surveys, and vessel-monitoring surveys.

Fishery-independent data is obtained in the absence of any fishing activity. The majority of this data is collected by state and federal agencies. A wide variety of methods and gear types are used to acquire fishery-independent data. Sampling equipment can include trawls, seines, acoustic and/or video surveys. The study may focus on a single species, multiple species, or a specific age range or cohort. Regardless of the method or approach, these surveys provide managers with an estimate of abundance. Mark and recapture studies are commonly used to estimate movement, migration, growth rate, natural mortality, and discard mortality. Stock assessments are often completed using both fishery-dependent and fishery-independent data.

== Overfished versus overfishing ==
Overfished refers to the number of fish in the stock. Typically a stock is described as being overfished when current biomass of a stock is lower than what is required to support the maximum sustainable yield. Overfishing describes the rate of removal from a stock and can be categorized as two different types: recruitment and economic. Recruitment overfishing is when fishing pressure is too heavy to allow a fish population to replace itself. Economic overfishing occurs when the level of fish harvesting is higher than that of economic efficiency and more fish are harvested than necessary to have maximum profits for the fishery.

== Biological reference points ==
Biological reference points are the primary output of stock assessments and fishing regulations are set to meet these biological benchmarks. There are several types of benchmarks are used depending on the preference of the regulating agency. The benchmarks are used to control different aspects of the fishery or population. Benchmarks that regulate fishing mortality include Fcurr, Fmsy, Emsy, and MFMT. Fcurr is the current level of fishing mortality, Fmsy is the fishing mortality that produces the maximum sustainable yield, and Emsy is the expected level of fishing that will produce the maximum sustainable yield. SSBcurr, SSBmsy, and MSST are used in the regulation of biomass levels. SSBcurr stands for the current spawning stock biomass, SSBmsy is the amount of spawning stock biomass needed to produce the maximum sustainable yield, and MSST is the minimum standing stock threshold. The amount that is available to be harvested is controlled by the benchmarks MSY and OY. MSY is the maximum sustainable yield and OY is the optimum yield of a stock. The main difference between MSY and OY is that MSY considers only the biology of the fish while the OY considers the economic aspect of the harvest.

Some of these benchmarks are combined in the form of ratios in order to better understand the status of the stock. A Fcurr/Fmsy ratio greater than one indicates that overfishing is occurring. When SSBcurr/SSBmsy is greater than one, the MSY will be produced, but if it is less than one it means that the stock is overfished. MFMT and MSST are used as limit reference points. When MFMT is exceeded or the spawning stock size dips below MSST the fishery is shut down. A benchmark that is currently gaining in popularity is SPR, spawning potential ratio. The SPR is the average fecundity of a recruit over its lifetime when the stock is fished divided by the average fecundity of a recruit over its lifetime when the stock is unfished. The SPR is based on the principle that certain levels of fish have to survive in order to spawn and replenish the stock at a sustainable level.

Some reference points focus on absolute biomass rather than spawning biomass or fishing mortality. For example, in Australia, it is often recommended that fish stocks are maintained at 60% of unfished biomass (referred to as B60). In the European union fish stocks are often recommended to be maintained at 120% of the biomass at MSY. These reference points are meant to be more conservative than BMSY which is typically around 40-50% of unfished biomass, depending on the model and parameter values. However recent work has suggested that more conservative reference points might be warranted for slow growing species depending on the model used.

== Catch curve ==
A catch curve is a descriptive figure that describes catch by age and length. A catch curve only reflects fish that have recruited to a fishery and does not reflect the full age structure of a stock. A catch curve illustrates the proportions that different age and size classes are harvested by a fishery.

== Assessment models ==
The mathematical and statistical techniques used to complete a stock assessment are referred to as assessment models. Three commonly used models are surplus production models, statistical age- or length-structured models, and virtual population analysis models. Of these models, surplus production models are the least complex and require the least amount of data. This model describes the stock solely in regards of biomass and the only used total catch and effort data. These are most commonly used in situations limited data is available on a stock. Statistical age(length)-structured models are based on the age(length) structure of a fished population. These models use the proportional catch-at-age and/or length to predict the relative abundance of each age(length) class. These calculated relative abundances are then used to estimate future abundances of the stock and harvest regulations are set based on the predicted future abundances. In virtual population analysis models, catch-at-age data is used to estimate historical stock abundance. From this analysis, the manager then determines if overfishing is occurring. The type of model used depends on the data that is available. Modern stock assessment methods use statistical approaches to "integrate" multiple sources of information to estimate management quantities and their associated uncertainty.

== After a stock assessment ==
After a stock assessment is completed, the findings are provided to regional fishery management councils. The council identifies stocks that are in danger of overfishing or currently overfished, and then develops fishery management plans and regulations. Fishery management plans (FMP) must protect fishery resources while maintaining opportunities for domestic recreational and commercial fishing at sustainable levels of effort and yield. If a stock already has a FMP, the stock assessment is used to modify the FMP in response to current conditions. The public are also encouraged to participate in the management process and public hearings are held to allow for comment before the new management policies are enforced.
