= Virtual population analysis =

Virtual population analysis (VPA) is a cohort modeling technique commonly used in fisheries science for reconstructing historical fish numbers at age using information on death of individuals each year. This death is usually partitioned into catch by fisheries and natural mortality. VPA is virtual in the sense that the population size is not observed or measured directly but is inferred or back-calculated to have been a certain size in the past in order to support the observed fish catches and an assumed death rate owing to non-fishery related causes.

Virtual population analysis was introduced in fish stock assessment by Gulland in 1965 based on older work. The technique of cohort reconstruction in fish populations has been attributed to several different workers including Professor Baranov from Russia in 1918 for his development of the continuous catch equation, Professor Fry from Canada in 1949 and Drs. Beverton and Holt from the UK in 1957. Because cohort reconstruction is essentially an accounting exercise it was likely independently conceived many times.

Several different software implementations of cohort reconstruction for fish populations exist including ADAPT, which is often used in Canada and the USA, and XSA which is commonly used in Europe. The back-calculations in these implementations work the same way but they differ in the statistical methods used for "tuning" to indices of population size.

== See also ==
- Population dynamics of fisheries
