= Baranov =

Baranov (masculine) or Baranova (feminine) (Russian: Баранов, Баранова) is a common Russian surname. It is derived from the sobriquet "баран" (argali, lamb). Notable people with the surname include:

- Alexander Andreyevich Baranov (1747–1819), first governor of Russian Alaska
- Alexander Ivanovich Baranov (1946–2025), Russian Army officer
- Alyaksandr Baranaw (born 1974), Belarusian footballer
- Anastasia Baranova (born 1989), Russian American actress
- Boris Aleksandrovich Baranov (1940–2005), Engineer and Chernobyl liquidator
- Elena Baranova (born 1972), Kyrgyzstan-born professional basketball player in America
- Fedor I. Baranov (1886–1965), Russian fisheries scientist
- Konstantin Baranov (born 1982), Russian ice hockey player
- Lyubov Baranova (1929–2015), Soviet cross-country skier
- Matwai Baranov (born 1965), Israeli Olympic wrestler
- Nadiya Baranova, Ukrainian football goalie
- Natalya Baranova-Masalkina (born 1975), Russian cross-country skier
- Nikita Baranov (born 1992), Estonian footballer
- Nikolay Baranov (born 1960), Soviet sprint canoer
- Nikolay Ilyich Baranov (1887–1981), Russian entomologist
- Oleksandr Baranov (born 1960), Soviet and Ukrainian football player and coach
- Sergei Baranov (figure skater) (born 1983), Ukrainian ice dancer
- Sergei Baranov (volleyball) (born 1981), Russian volleyball player
- Valeriy Baranov (1957–2023), Ukrainian politician
- Valery Baranov (soldier) (born 1948), Russian colonel general
- Veera Baranova (born 1984), Estonian triple jumper
- Victoria Baranova (born 1990), Russian track cyclist
- Viktor Baranov (disambiguation), multiple people
- Vitaliy Baranov (born 1975), Ukrainian ice dancer
- Vladimir Baranov-Rossine (1888–1944), Russian avant-garde artist
- Yevgeni Zakharovich Baranov (1869–1934), Russian historian, see ru:Баранов, Евгений Захарович

== See also ==
- Baranovka (disambiguation)
- Baranowski
- Tatiana Baganova, Russian dance choreographer
