= Baratov =

Baratov is a surname. Notable people with the surname include:

- Boris Baratov, Armenian screenwriter and filmmaker
- Dilshodbek Baratov (born 1997), Uzbekistani judoka
- Iosif Baratov, Georgian politician
- Leonid Baratov (1895–1964), Soviet opera director
- Nikolai Baratov (1865–1932), Imperial Russian Army general
- Renat Baratov (born 1991), Russian footballer

== See also ==
- Baranov, surname
