= Milner Baily Schaefer =

American fisheries scientist (1912–1970)

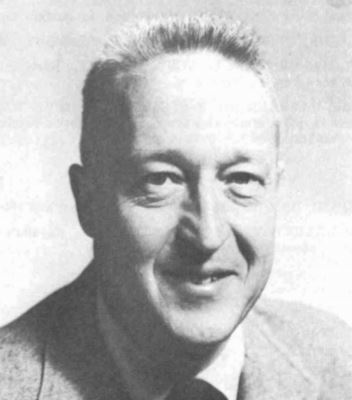
- Born: December 14, 1912; Cheyenne, Wyoming
- Died: July 26, 1970 (aged 57); San Diego
- Education: University of Washington
- Known for: The Schaefer model, fisheries science, bioeconomics
- Spouse: Isabella Long
- Scientific career
- Workplaces: Inter-American Tropical Tuna Commission, Scripps Institution of Oceanography

Milner Baily ("Benny") Schaefer (1912 in Cheyenne, Wyoming – 1970 in San Diego, California), is notable for his work on the population dynamics of fisheries.

== Career ==
Schaefer worked as a biologist at the Washington State Fisheries Department. From 1937 to 1942 as a scientist for the International Pacific Salmon Fisheries Commission in New Westminster, British Columbia, Canada. In 1946 he joined the United States Fish and Wildlife Service and held various posts at the Fishery Biology Headquarters at Stanford University. Later, he worked at the Pacific Oceanic Fisheries Investigations Laboratory in Honolulu, Hawaii, and completed a fisheries doctorate from the University of Washington in 1950. In 1951 Schaefer became Director of Investigations at the Inter-American Tropical Tuna Commission (IATTC). IATTC established its first headquarters at the Scripps Institution of Oceanography.

== Schaefer short-term catch equation ==
During his period at the IATTC, Schaefer worked on the development of theories of fishery dynamics and published a fishery equilibrium model based on the Verhulst population growth model and an assumption of a bi-linear catch equation, often referred to as the Schaefer short-term catch equation:

$H(E,X)=q E X\!$

where the variables are; H, referring to catch (harvest) over a given period of time (e.g. a year); E, the fishing effort over the given period; X, the fish stock biomass at the beginning of the period (or the average biomass), and the parameter q represents the catchability of the stock. Assuming the catch to equal the net natural growth in the population over the same period ($\dot{X}=0$), the equilibrium catch is a function of the long term fishing effort E:

$H(E)=q K E \left(1-\frac{qE}{r}\right)$

r and K being biological parameters representing intrinsic growth rate and natural equilibrium biomass respectively.

Schaefer published during the 1950s a range of papers of empirical studies based on the model, the most famous perhaps being A study of the dynamics of the fishery for yellowfin tuna in the Eastern Tropical Pacific Ocean. Other researchers also soon saw the potential of developing the model tools further.

== Gordon-Schaefer model ==
Schaefer's seminal paper further extends the biological model to account for dynamics of fishing pressure in an unregulated fishery, assuming that fishing effort increases until profit can no longer be made. Thus, the fishery reaches an equilibrium, referred to as the bionomic equilibrium by H. Scott Gordon in a paper published the same year as Schaefer's but focused on purely economics of fishing. Apparently, Schaefer and Gordon did not know about each other's work, and today their bioeconomic model is known as Gordon-Schaefer Model. It is a common to credit Schaefer only for the biological part of this model , but this is a mistake. Together, the work by Schaefer and Gordon set the basis for quantitative analyses of fisheries economics.
