= Robert Lackey =

Robert Lackey may refer to:

- Robert Lackey (American football), American football coach
- Robert T. Lackey (born 1944), Canadian-born fisheries scientist and political scientist
- Bob Lackey (1949–2002), American basketball player

== See also ==
- Bobby Lackey (1937–2021), American football player
