= Baganov =

Baganov (Russian: Баганов) is a Russian masculine surname, its feminine counterpart is Baganova. Notable people with the surname include:

- Tatiana Baganova, Russian contemporary dance choreographer
- Vitali Baganov (born 1952), Russian film and television actor
