= Robert T. Lackey =

Canadian fisheries scientist

- Born: Kamloops, British Columbia
- Education: Colorado State University; University of Maine; Humboldt State University
- Known for: natural resource science and management, interface of science and policy, use and misuse of science in the political process
- Scientific career
- Fields: fisheries science, ecology, natural resources
- Doctoral advisor: W. Harry Everhart

Robert T. Lackey (born 1944) is a Canadian born fisheries scientist and political scientist living in the United States. He is best known for his work involving the interplay between science and policy, natural resource management, and assessments of the future of salmon runs. Lackey is a professor of fisheries and wildlife and adjunct professor of political science at Oregon State University. From 1981–2008, he held senior leadership posts at the United States Environmental Protection Agency research laboratory in Corvallis, Oregon.

== Biography ==
Robert Thomas Lackey received a B.S. (fisheries) from Humboldt State University in 1967, an M.S. (Zoology) in 1968 from University of Maine, and a PhD (Fisheries and Wildlife) in 1971 from Colorado State University. He was then hired by Virginia Tech as assistant professor of fisheries and became associate professor in 1973. In 1976–1977, he spent a sabbatical year in Washington, D.C., working with the United States Fish and Wildlife Service Environment Program as the national program coordinator. In 1979, he led the U.S. Fish and Wildlife Service's National Water Resources Analysis Group located in West Virginia. In 1981, he was senior biologist with the U.S. Environmental Protection Agency research laboratory in Corvallis, Oregon, and was deputy director from 1989 to 2000. In 1982, he became Courtesy Professor in the Department of Fisheries and Wildlife at Oregon State University, a position he continues to hold. In 1999, Lackey was awarded a senior Fulbright Fellowship and spend his tenure at the University of Northern British Columbia. He retired from the Environmental Protection Agency in 2008 to work at Oregon State University.

== Contributions ==
Lackey had an early focus on solving practical fisheries problems, improving fish yields using various novel habitat enhancement techniques. In later years he focused on better defining the roles of scientific information and scientists in natural resource policy. Lackey's leadership in developing policy options to restore wild salmon to the west coast of the United States is well known and controversial. It has been criticized for being overly pessimistic, and is regarded by others as a blunt assessment of reality. In 2005, he completed a 4-year collaborative effort, the Salmon 2100 Project. This encouraged senior scientists and policy experts to develop practical policy options that, if implemented, would restore wild salmon runs in California, Oregon, Washington, Idaho, and southern British Columbia. A book of the same title was published in 2006. He has lectured widely advocating that scientists should be vigilant about keeping personal policy preferences out of scientific activities. He is a proponent of the view that the pervasive use of normative science is undermining the credibility of the scientific enterprise. More recently he has expanded this line of research to assessing how scientific information in fisheries, wildlife, conservation biology, natural resources, and environmental science has increasingly become influenced by a value-infused information that he labels as Religious Ecology. His current work focuses on education, especially developing online graduate courses in ecological and natural resource policy.

== Some publications ==
Books

- Lackey, Robert T. 1974. Introductory Fisheries Science. Sea Grant, Virginia Polytechnic Institute and State University, Blacksburg, Virginia, 280 pp.
- Lackey, Robert T., and Wayne A. Hubert. Editors. 1978. Analysis of Exploited Fish Populations. Sea Grant, Virginia Polytechnic Institute and State University, Blacksburg, Virginia, 97 pp.
- Lackey, Robert T., and Larry A. Nielsen. Editors. 1980. Fisheries Management. John Wiley & Sons, New York, New York, 422 pp.
- Mazaika, Rosemary, Robert T. Lackey, and Stephen L. Friant. Editors. 1995. Ecological Risk Assessment: Use, Abuse, and Alternatives. Amherst Scientific Publishers, Amherst, Massachusetts.
- Lackey, Robert T., Denise H. Lach, and Sally L. Duncan. Editors. 2006. Salmon 2100: The Future of Wild Pacific Salmon. American Fisheries Society, Bethesda, Maryland, 629 pp.

Journal articles

- Lackey, Robert T. 1998. Seven pillars of ecosystem management. Landscape and Urban Planning. 40(1-3): 21-30.
- Lackey, Robert T. 2003. Pacific Northwest salmon: forecasting their status in 2100. Reviews in Fisheries Science. 11(1): 35-88.
- Lackey, Robert T. 2006. Axioms of ecological policy. Fisheries. 31(6): 286-290.
- Lackey, Robert T. 2007. Science, scientists, and policy advocacy. Conservation Biology. 21(1): 12-17.
- Lackey, Robert T. 2009. Challenges to sustaining diadromous fishes through 2100: lessons learned from western North America. pp. 609–617. In: Haro, A., et al., editors. Challenges for Diadromous Fishes in a Dynamic Global Environment, American Fisheries Society.
