= Rosa Lee =

Statistician

Rosa Mabel Lee
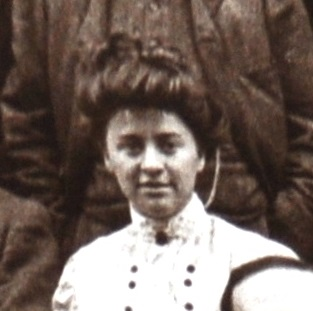
- Born: 1884; Conwy, Caernarvonshire, Wales
- Died: 1976 (aged 91–92); Greenwich, London, England
- Education: Bangor University
- Known for: First woman to work as a government fisheries scientist in the UK
- Scientific career
- Fields: Statistics; Fisheries Science
- Workplaces: Marine Biological Association of the United Kingdom; Ministry of Agriculture, Fisheries and Food (United Kingdom)

Rosa Mabel Lee (1884-1976) was a British statistician, the first woman scientist to be employed by the Marine Biological Association and the first woman to work as a government fishery scientist in the United Kingdom.

Lee studied the growth of fish using the growth rings on their scales. In 1920, she discovered the effect now known as the 'Lee phenomenon' or 'Rosa Lee Phenomenon', and her results are still cited in modern publications.

== Early years ==
Lee was born in Conwy, Caernarvonshire in 1884. Her father, George Henry Payne Lee was a civil servant, born in Exeter, Devon. Her mother was Maria Agnes, born in St Pancras, London. In 1894, her father worked in Conwy as a postal telegraph inspector. Rosa had two older brothers (Harold and Albert) and two older sisters (Amy and Florence).

She graduated from Bangor University in 1904 with a BA in mathematics (Class: II), its first woman graduate in mathematics.

== Working life ==
Lee was employed by the Marine Biological Association (MBA) in their laboratory at Lowestoft, the first woman scientist to be employed by the MBA. Lee became the first woman to work as a government fishery scientist when she was employed as an assistant naturalist in 1905. In 1910, all of the staff at Lowestoft were transferred to the Board of Agriculture and Fisheries and during the original transfer, Lee was not offered a job. The board reportedly stated that they 'did not employ women scientists'. However, after protests from the MBA and Garstang, she was allowed to start work as a civil servant. She continued her research and stayed on with the Board of Agriculture and Fisheries in London until 1919. She worked at the office in Delahay Street, Westminster.

In the 1911 census she was recorded as living in London with her sister, Amy Lee at 2 Avenue House, St Johns Wood, London. The street is now renamed Allison Street but Avenue House still exists.

Rosa Lee married Thomas Lewis Williams in 1917, but had to leave the Civil Service in 1919 as the marriage bar rules at the time did not allow married women to continue in employment.

Rosa and Thomas subsequently moved to Abergavenny, Monmouthshire, where Rosa stayed, until after her husband's death in 1946. Rosa herself died in Greenwich (London) in 1976, aged 92.

== Scientific work ==
Lee published a number of important scientific papers in her working life, including an article that appeared in Nature in 1920. However, her most cited work is not one published in a prestigious journal, but is a report for the Ministry of Agriculture and Fisheries.

== Rosa Lee phenomenon ==
Fish scales have growth rings and are used to age fish, in the same way that tree rings can be used to age trees. Fishery scientists try and understand the fish populations by modelling. They need to know how old and how big the fish are and how each ‘cohort’ of the population will grow as it matures. Each catch of fish has fish of different ages, i.e. fish that were born in different years. The size and growth of these fish can be linked to environmental variables. Predicting future stock of fish is necessary for good management, and to do this, accurate estimates of growth rates and 'length at age' are required. By measuring the rings of a fish its possible to say how long it was for every year of its life.

Lee observed that you may get different results for growth rates by 'back calculating' from an older fish, than you would when calculating growth rates from younger fish. This phenomenon occurs when individuals in a population with slower growth rates suffer less mortality when young. The older population is skewed by more slower growing fish, as the faster growing fish died at a younger age. There can be a number of reasons for this, one reason can be selective mortality, e.g. fishing gear that selects for a particular size of fish will catch the larger young fish and the smaller old fish. It can also occur when the sampling is biased.

Rosa Lee's work is still relevant today and her paper is frequently cited, however her actual influence is greater than indicated by the number of citations, because some scientific authors simply refer to 'Rosa Lee's phenomenon' rather than correctly citing her publication.
