= Carl Schreck =

American biologist

- Born: Carl Bernhard Schreck; San Francisco, California
- Education: University of California, Berkeley, Colorado State University
- Known for: Causes and effects of stress in fishes, reproductive endocrinology of fishes
- Awards: Presidential Meritorious Professional Service Award – White House (2007/2008), Meritorious Service Award – Secretary of the Interior (2003), Award of Excellence – American Fisheries Society (2009), Educator of the Year Award – American Fisheries Society (2000), Award of Excellence in Fish Physiology – American Fisheries Society (2012)
- Scientific career
- Fields: Comparative endocrinology, ecophysiology, aquaculture and hatchery sciences
- Workplaces: Oregon State University, United States Geological Survey, Oregon Department of Fish and Wildlife

Carl Bernhard Schreck is an American biologist specializing in comparative endocrinology of fishes, best known for his contributions to our knowledge of stress in fish. Since 1975 he has been a professor at Oregon State University, holding the position of senior scientist and leader (since 1977) of the Oregon Cooperative Fish and Wildlife Research Unit.

== Education ==
Carl Schreck graduated from UC Berkeley in 1966 with an A.B. in Zoology. At Berkeley, he was greatly influenced by Dr. Howard Bern, one of the founders of the field of comparative endocrinology. After studying at Humboldt State University for one year, he went to Colorado State University where he completed his M.S. in Fisheries Science (1969), supervised by Robert J. Behnke. His master’s thesis was titled “Trouts of the Upper Kern River Basin, California”. Schreck continued his studies at Colorado State, receiving his Ph.D. in Physiology, Biophysics, and Fisheries science (1972) co-supervised by Dr. M. Lloyd Hopwood and Dr. Robert J. Behnke. His doctoral dissertation was titled “Reproductive Endocrinology of Fishes”.

== Career ==
Rather than move onto a post-doctoral position, following completion of his Ph.D. Schreck immediately took up a position of Assistant Professor at Virginia Polytechnic Institute and State University. After a short stint in Virginia, in 1975 he moved to Oregon State University, where he continues to run an active research program. His professorship at OSU is a position funded by the U.S. government via the USGS, in partnership with the Oregon Department of Fish and Wildlife. Thus, he has had three titles since 1977: Leader of the Oregon Cooperative Fish and Wildlife Research Unit, Senior Scientist with the USGS, and Full Professor in the Department of Fisheries and Wildlife at OSU.

Dr. Schreck is currently serving his third four-year term as a member of the Independent Multidisciplinary Science Team (IMST) for the state of Oregon, having been appointed by the Governor, Speaker of the House, and President of the Senate. He has been elected as co-chair of the IMST for the last six years. Schreck is also in his third four-year term as President of the International Federation of Fish Endocrinologists. He served on the Oregon Governor’s Coastal Salmon Science Team where he helped develop plans for at risk salmon and trout for the federal listing process.

Dr. Schreck has supervised approximately 80 graduate student theses to date, and has authored over 280 publications.

== Contributions ==
Schreck has provided a series of contributions to our knowledge of fish biology and to the field of comparative endocrinology. He was among the first to publish about the notion of allostasis, although he did not coin the term. Most of his work has involving using salmonids as a model, but he has also published findings on a number of other species. He has helped to define stress in fishes, and to describe its mechanisms and effects at the organism level. For example, he contributed some of the early work describing the negative effects of cortisol and stress on immune function and disease resistance in fish, and has helped develop an understanding of the interactions between the endocrine system and the immune system. He has also contributed a number of papers on the effects of different rearing conditions, handling, and transport practices on indices of stress, endocrine function, and performance in juvenile Pacific salmon. Some of his work has also examined the interplay between endocrine variables and behaviour, notably the capacity for predator avoidance. Because of the volume of his contributions on the effects of hatchery practices on fish stress and performance, Schreck could be considered one of the world authorities on fish stress in the context of aquaculture. Some of Dr. Schreck’s other contributions to comparative endocrinology include work on reproductive endocrinology – particularly in the early part of his career. As part of his PhD work, in 1973 Schreck published the first use of the radioimmunoassay for measuring hormones in fish blood, the laboratory method most commonly and widely used since that time for measuring hormones (e.g., cortisol) in the blood of fishes.

Schreck’s work has often involved genetics and systematics, and he helped to pioneer some of the methods used in those fields. Specifically, he co-authored the first paper on using a mathematical approach to constructing family trees of fishes (phenograms). In addition, he and his graduate student were the first to combine multiple types of characteristics to establish genetic similarity among fishes – using morphology, allozyme patterns, and life history traits (DNA was added in subsequent publications).

Since the mid-1990s, Dr. Schreck’s research program has expanded to include contributions to fish migration using biotelemetry, and to the post-release fate of fishes captured in commercial fishing gear. For example, his collaboration with scientists from the National Oceanic and Atmospheric Administration on the effects of fisheries capture on immune function in sablefish remains the sole examination in the scientific literature of the effects of fisheries capture on immune function. Recent biotelemetry studies authored by Schreck have built on earlier lab-based behavioral studies to help reveal mechanisms of migration success in juvenile salmon and Pacific lamprey.
