= Ransom A. Myers =

American-Canadian biologist (1952–2007)

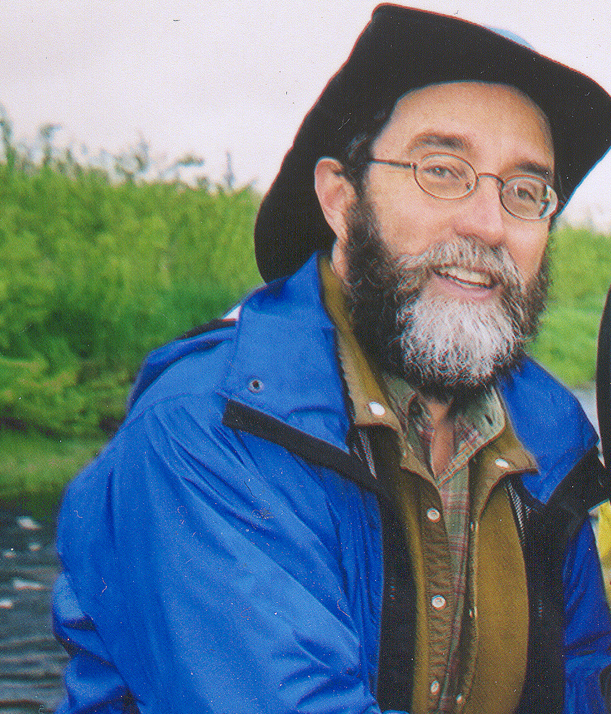
- Ransom A. Myers
- Born: 13 June 1952; Lula, Mississippi
- Died: 27 March 2007 (aged 54); Halifax, Nova Scotia, Canada
- Education: Rice University; Dalhousie University
- Spouse(s): Rita Kindl-Myers (1994-2007); Heather Myers (1980-1990)
- Children: Gioia Myers, Carlo Myers, Sophia Myers, Rosie Myers, Emily Myers
- Scientific career
- Fields: Biologist
- Workplaces: Dalhousie University

Ransom Aldrich "Ram" Myers, Jr. (13 June 1952 – 27 March 2007) was an American-Canadian marine biologist and conservationist.

Born in Lula, Mississippi, he was the son of cotton planter, Ransom Aldrich Myers, Sr. and Fay A. Mitchell Myers. At age 16, in 1968, Myers won an international science fair for building an "X-ray crystallograph," which measured the symmetry of atoms.

Myers graduated with a B.Sc. in physics from Rice University in 1974. He earned an M.Sc. in mathematics and a Ph.D. in biology from Dalhousie University in Nova Scotia, Canada. Before joining the faculty of Dalhousie University in 1997 as the first Killam Chair in Ocean Studies, he was a research scientist at the Canadian Department of Fisheries and Oceans in St. John's, Newfoundland and Labrador.

Myers was best known for his warnings about the worldwide overfishing of the fish stocks in the oceans, in particular, the Atlantic cod and Southern bluefin tuna. As a member of the International Union for Conservation of Nature and Natural Resources (IUCN) shark specialist group, he collected data about the decline of shark populations and brought media attention to threatened shark species. One of Myers' most important areas of research was stock recruitment: collection and analysis of data and the subsequent development of models to predict the survival rate for fish larvae.

In the October 2005 issue of Fortune, Myers was listed among the world's ten people to watch for "working to develop new and better ways to husband the wealth beneath the sea."

He died in Halifax, Nova Scotia, aged 54, from a brain tumor.
