= Boris Baratov =

Armenian film director

Boris Baratov is a screenwriter, filmmaker and the author of dozens of films. Boris Baratov has written numerous books about scholars and writers. Many of his films were based on Armenia, the architectural monuments of Artsakh and of the most ancient Christian, together with its history and culture.

“The Armeniad 's visible pages of history,” chronicles the ancient kingdoms of Armenia and the impact they had on Armenian and world history.

== Books ==
- “Bogdan Saltanov” [1986]
- “Leonardo da Vinci” [1987]
- A train ride to the past, the present and the future
- Paradise Laid Waste: A Journey to Karabakh

== Films ==
- “The Dance,”
- “Stones,”
- “The Round Table”
- “Holy Etchmiadzin”
