= W. Harry Everhart =

American biologist

- Born: June 5, 1918; Connellsville, Pennsylvania, United States
- Died: October 1, 1994 (aged 76)
- Education: Westminster College; University of Pittsburgh; Cornell University
- Scientific career
- Fields: Fisheries science
- Workplaces: United States Air Force; University of Maine; Colorado State University; Cornell University

W. Harry Everhart (June 5, 1918 – October 1, 1994) was one of the leaders in fisheries science, fisheries management, and fisheries education in North America.

== Early life and education ==
He was born (June 5, 1918) in Connellsville, Pennsylvania. In 1940, he graduated with a Bachelor of Science degree from Westminster College (Pennsylvania). He earned a Master of Science degree from the University of Pittsburgh in 1942 and immediately entered the United States Air Force, achieving the rank of Squadron Commander.

In 1945, Everhart enrolled in the fisheries doctoral program at Cornell University. He was awarded a PhD in 1948 and joined the faculty at the University of Maine in 1949. In 1950, he was also appointed Chief of Fisheries of the Maine Department of Inland Fisheries and Game. In 1955, he was also appointed Chief of Research of the Maine Atlantic Salmon Commission. He was promoted to Associate Professor in 1952 and to Professor in 1956. He served as chairman of the fishery major at Colorado State University (1967-1972) and chairman of the Department of Natural Resources at Cornell University (1972-1982.

== Contributions ==
During his tenure at the University of Maine, Colorado State University, and Cornell University, he coauthored (1953) a text in fisheries science. Second (1975) and third (1981) editions were produced with various coauthors. These texts were widely used in university fisheries courses for many years.

Apart from his widely used fisheries management texts, Everhart is probably best known for his influence on graduate students and the development of the Fisheries Division of the Maine Department of Inland Fisheries and Wildlife. He served as the academic advisor to many MS and PhD students while a professor at the University of Maine, Colorado State University, and Cornell University. Altogether, he authored or coauthored 54 scholarly articles and books.
