= Gordon-Schaefer model =

Bioeconomic model applied in the fishing industry

The Gordon-Schaefer model is a bioeconomic model applied in the fishing industry. It may be used to compute the maximum sustainable yield. It takes account of biological growth rates, carrying capacity, and total and marginal costs and revenues.

This model can be applied in three primary scenarios: Monopoly; Maximum Sustainable Yield (biological optimum); and Open Access.

== Monopoly ==
Profit maximizing firms, whether in monopoly or competitive markets, increase production to the point that marginal revenue = marginal costs. Monopoly firms produce less at higher prices than competitive markets.

== Maximum sustainable yield ==
The maximum sustainable yield (MSY) is the largest amount of biomass that can be collected annually for indefinite periods. MSY assesses the productive capacity of the fishery, rather than demand or economic costs. MSY output may be greater or less than monopolistic or competitive output.

== Open access ==
Open access is an unrestricted market. In open access, production in a given year is limited by demand and the costs of production without regard to that year's effects on future years. Open access markets can be competitive or monopolistic.
