= Garth I. Murphy =

- Born: 7 November 1922; Portland, Oregon
- Died: 5 May 2001 (aged 78); Woodland, California
- Education: UC Berkeley, Scripps Institution of Oceanography
- Scientific career
- Fields: Biological oceanography, fisheries oceanography
- Workplaces: Scripps Institution of Oceanography, University of Hawaiʻi

Garth Ivor Murphy (1922–2001) was an American biological and fishery oceanographer best known for his contributions to understanding of the population dynamics of Pacific sardine and of the evolution of iteroparity and reproductive lifespan.

== Education and career ==
Murphy obtained his first degrees from the University of California, Berkeley. In 1959 he became the first CalCOFI coordinator. He was the first person to earn a doctorate from the Scripps Institution of Oceanography in 1965. He was appointed a professor of oceanography at the University of Hawaiʻi in 1965.

== Scientific work ==
Murphy was interested in the reasons of the decline in the California sardine population. He argued that the reduced number of reproductive year classes in the population, caused both by the fisheries and by the environment, had made the population more vulnerable to environmentally-caused fluctuations in reproductive success. Murphy used his experience with sardine to suggest that variable juvenile survival can select for iteroparity even when average demographic parameters would suggest semelparity. Modern textbooks interpret this as an example of bet hedging.
