= Biotone =

A biotone is a biogeographical region characterized not by distinctive biota but rather by a distinctive transition from one set of biota to another. They often contain the limits of distribution of the biota of neighbouring regions.

Biotones are especially useful in marine biogeography, where the movement of water may result in substantial overlap in the floral and faunal components of adjacent regions. In such case, the regions of overlap is considered a biotone.

A simple example would be mid-latitude waters where tropical and temperate waters mix. This region is a biotone characterized by the transition between tropical and temperate waters. It would contain both tropical and temperate biota. Tropical biota that do not extend into temperate areas would be at the limit of their range in this biotone, and vice versa. The co-occurrence of biota that are normally distinct can result in unusual ecological relationships.
