= Viktor Baranov =

Viktor Baranov may refer to:

- Viktor Baranov (diver) (1893–?), Russian Olympic diver
- Viktor Dmitryevich Baranov (1928–2005), Soviet cross-country skier
- Viktor Ilyich Baranov (1906–1996), Soviet armor commander
- Viktor Kirillovich Baranov (1901–1970), Soviet cavalry commander
