= Fish mortality =

Parameter in fisheries population dynamics

Fish mortality is a parameter used in fisheries population dynamics to account for the loss of fish in a fish stock through death. The mortality can be divided into two types:

- Natural mortality: the removal of fish from the stock due to causes not associated with fishing. Such causes can include disease, competition, cannibalism, old age, predation, pollution or any other natural factor that causes the death of fish. In fisheries models natural mortality is denoted by (M).
- Fishing mortality: the removal of fish from the stock due to fishing activities using any fishing gear. It is denoted by (F) in fisheries models.

(M) and (F) are additive instantaneous rates that sum up to (Z), the instantaneous total mortality coefficient; that is, Z=M+F. These rates are usually calculated on an annual basis. Estimates of fish mortality rates are often included in mathematical yield models to predict yield levels obtained under various exploitation scenarios. These are used as resource management indices or in bioeconomic studies of fisheries.

== Estimating mortality ==
=== Natural ===
Estimating natural mortality (M) is one of the most difficult and critical elements of a stock assessment. There are two basic approaches used to estimate natural mortality: tagging studies and growth parameters. Tagging studies are used in the Brownie Model, where multiyear tagging studies are used to estimate natural mortality based on recaptures:

fi = ri(1 – Si)

The Paulys Model (using growth parameters) is an indirect way of estimating natural mortality. It assumes that there is a relationship between size and natural mortality. Pauly’s original method was based on the correlation of M with von Bertalanffy growth parameters (K and L∞) and temperature (Gunderson 2002):

N0 = N 1*e(-Z*∆t)

In the Hoenigs method, M was inversely correlated with longevity across a wide variety of taxa (Hewitt and Hoenig 2005):

Ln(M) = 1.44-0.982*ln(tmax)

=== Fishing ===
Fishing mortality (F) can be estimated by dividing the catch by the mean stock size. The catch includes annual commercial and recreational landings, along with dead discards. Bycatch discards would be estimated by estimating the percent of fish that are captured in a certain gear and the mortality associated with being captured in this gear. These mortality studies are generally done by using cages for a certain period of time following capture to determine the percentage of fish that die during being held in holding cages. These deaths are assumed to be associated with physical injury or physiological stress from being captured in the gear used during capture.

== Why estimating mortality is important ==
Mortality estimates are important to managers. Determining mortality rates are critical for determining abundance of fish populations. Using the model Z=M+F with M being Natural mortality and F being Fishing mortality (combined mortality from landings plus discard mortality) you can estimate the trend of a population. The mortality rates give you the total deaths of a population when you compare these to the total births or recruits to the population, you can determine if a population is increasing or decreasing. Knowing these rates can help managers to set harvest limits to (MSY) maximum sustainable yield or (OSY) optimum sustainable yield to give the maximum benefit to the stakeholders of the resource.

== See also ==
- Mortality rate
- Population dynamics of fisheries
- Fish kill
