= Bill Ricker =

Canadian scientist (1908–2001)

William Edwin Ricker, OC FRSC (August 11, 1908 – September 8, 2001) was a Canadian entomologist and important founder of fisheries science. He is best known for the Ricker model, which he developed in his studies of stock and recruitment in fisheries. The model can be used to predict the number of fish that will be present in a fishery. He also had an international standing as an entomologist and a scientific editor. He published 296 papers and books, 238 translations, and 148 scientific or literary manuscripts. His 1958 publication, "Handbook of computation for biological statistics of fish populations" and later updates were the standard books on the subject for decades.

== Achievements ==
Born in Waterdown, Ontario; Ricker was an authority in the taxonomy of stoneflies, and evolved an elegant classification which his fellow entomologists praised as "a thing of beauty and simplicity that made evolutionary sense".

In fisheries, he researched issues centred on Canadian fisheries and how to manage them. He is known particularly for his 1954 paper on recruitment and stock. He is also known for his Handbook of Computation for Biological Statistics of Fish Populations, published in 1958. This 348-page handbook became the standard reference for students and professionals around the world. It is still used in China as the standard text for fisheries science.

In 1950 Ricker became editor of the Journal of the Fisheries Research Board, and during his twelve-year tenure developed this into perhaps the most influential fisheries science journal in the world.

In his 1969 paper, Food from the sea, he reasoned that the quantity of food that could be harvested from the sea would be 150–160 million tonnes or 2.5 times the level in 1968. He demonstrated that an estimate of 100 million tonnes was too low and an estimate of 200 million tonnes was too high.

Ricker taught himself Russian so he could read the original papers of Feodor Baranov, a Russian fisheries scientist. In 1973 he published a 428-page Russian–English dictionary on terminology in hydrobiological science for students of fisheries and aquatic biology (Ricker 1973). This dictionary remains the only specialized text on fisheries terminology.

== Honours ==
His medals and awards include: in 1970 the Flavelle Medal, in 1966 the Professional Institute of the Public Service of Canada Gold Medal, and in 1983 the F.E.J. Fry Medal. In 1969, he received the first Award of Excellence of the American Fisheries Society. On his death in 2001, the Society established the William E. Ricker Resource Conservation Award. The University of Manitoba, Dalhousie University, and the University of Guelph, awarded him honorary doctoral degrees, and in 1986 he was appointed to the Order of Canada.

The Canadian Coast Guard fisheries research vessel CCGS W.E. Ricker is named after him.

== Other references ==
- Beamish, R J; Noakes, D J; Noakes D L G and Beamish, F W H (2003) William Edwin Ricker, OC, FRSC, LLD, DSc
- de Vries, Gerda; Hillen, Thomas; Lewis, Mark; Schonfisch, Birgitt; Muller, Johannes (2006), "The Ricker model", A Course in Mathematical Biology:, SIAM, pp. 212–219, ISBN 978-0-89871-612-2
- Marland, Eric Analysis of the Ricker Model
- Noakes, David L. G. (Ed.) (2006) Bill Ricker: an appreciation シュプリンガー・ジャパン株式会社, ISBN 978-1-4020-4707-7.
- A Passion for Science: Bill Ricker — A Scientific Journey VHS Videotape, Canada, IM, 1994.
- Ricker, W. E. (1954) Stock and Recruitment Journal of the Fisheries Research Board of Canada, 11(5): 559–623. doi:10.1139/f54-039
- Ricker, W E (1958) Handbook of computation for biological statistics of fish populations. Bulletin 119 of the Fisheries Resource Board, Canada, Ottawa.
- Ricker, W E (1969) Food from the sea. In Resources and man, a study and recommendation report of the Committee on Resources and Man, US National Academy of Sciences, Chap 5. W H Freeman, San Francisco, pp. 87–108.
- Ricker, W E (1973) Russian–English dictionary for students of fisheries and aquatic biology. Bulletin 183 of the Fisheries Resource Board, Canada, Ottawa.
