= Fisheries science =

Academic discipline of managing and understanding fisheries

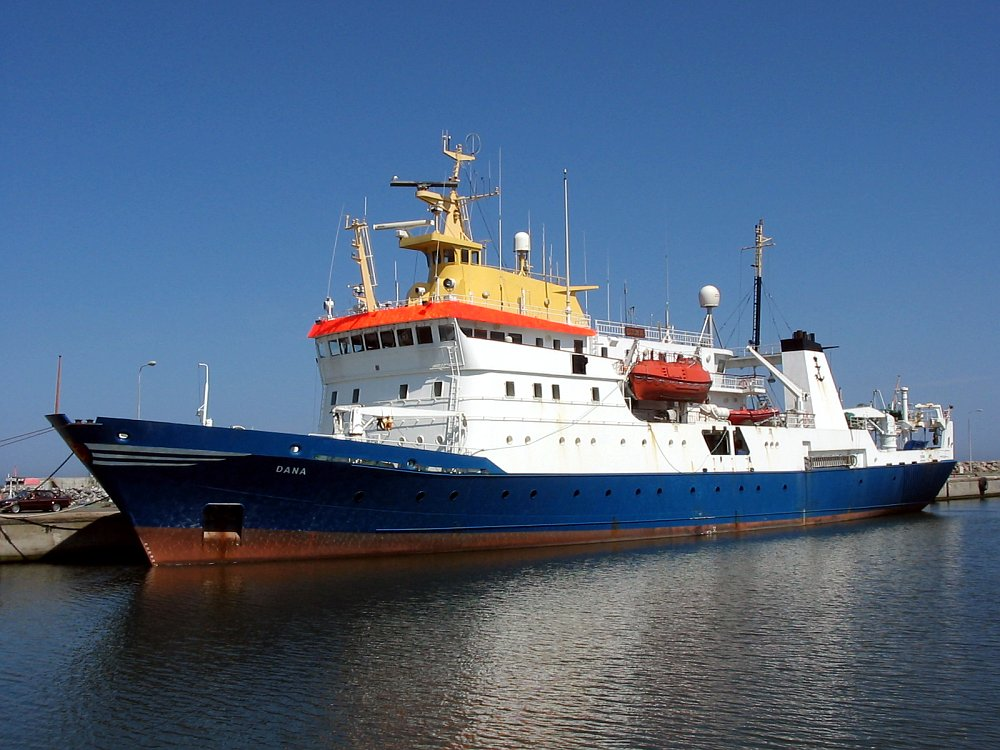
The 78-metre (256-foot) Danish fisheries research vessel Dana.

Fisheries science is the academic discipline of managing and understanding fisheries. It is a multidisciplinary science, which draws on the disciplines of limnology, oceanography, freshwater biology, marine biology, meteorology, conservation, ecology, population dynamics, economics, statistics, decision analysis, management, and many others in an attempt to provide an integrated picture of fisheries. In some cases new disciplines have emerged, as in the case of bioeconomics and fisheries law. Because fisheries science is such an all-encompassing field, fisheries scientists often use methods from a broad array of academic disciplines. Over the most recent several decades, there have been declines in fish stocks (populations) in many regions along with increasing concern about the impact of intensive fishing on marine and freshwater biodiversity.

Fisheries science is typically taught in a university setting, and can be the focus of an undergraduate, master's or Ph.D. program. Some universities offer fully integrated programs in fisheries science. Graduates of university fisheries programs typically find employment as scientists, fisheries managers of both recreational and commercial fisheries, researchers, aquaculturists, educators, environmental consultants and planners, conservation officers, and many others.

== Fisheries research ==
Because fisheries take place in a diverse set of aquatic environments (i.e., high seas, coastal areas, large and small rivers, and lakes of all sizes), research requires different sampling equipment, tools, and techniques. For example, studying trout populations inhabiting mountain lakes requires a very different set of sampling tools than, say, studying salmon in the high seas. Ocean fisheries research vessels (FRVs) often require platforms which are capable of towing different types of fishing nets, collecting plankton or water samples from a range of depths, and carrying acoustic fish-finding equipment. Fisheries research vessels are often designed and built along the same lines as a large fishing vessel, but with space given over to laboratories and equipment storage, as opposed to storage of the catch. In addition to a diverse set of sampling gear, fisheries scientists often use scientific techniques from many different professional disciplines.

Other important areas of fisheries research are population dynamics, economics, social studies and genetics.

== Notable contributors ==
Members of this list meet one or more of the following criteria: 1) Author of widely cited peer-reviewed articles on fisheries, 2) Author of major reference work in fisheries, 3) Founder of major fisheries journal, museum or other related organisation 4) Person most notable for other reasons who has also worked in fisheries science.

Contributor	Nationality	Born	Died	Contribution
Spencer F. Baird	American	1823	1887	Founding scientist of the United States Fish Commission. U.S. Commissioner of Fish and Fisheries from 1871 to 1887.
Fedor Baranov	Russian	1886	1965	Baranov has been called the grandfather of fisheries population dynamics. The Baranov catch equation of 1918 is perhaps the most used equation in fisheries modelling.
Ray Beverton	English	1922	1985	Fisheries biologist known for the Beverton–Holt model (with Sidney Holt), credited with being one of the founders of fisheries science
Villy Christensen	Danish		-	Fisheries scientist and ecosystem modeller, known for his work on the development of Ecopath
John N. Cobb	American	1868	1930	Founder of the first college of fisheries in the United States, the University of Washington College of Fisheries, in 1919
Steven J. Cooke	Canadian	1974		Academic known for contributions to recreational fisheries science, inland fisheries and Conservation Physiology
David Cushing	English	1920	2008	Fisheries biologist, who is credited with the development of the match/mismatch hypothesis
W. Harry Everhart	American	1918	1994	Fisheries scientist, educator, administrator and author of several widely used fisheries texts
Rainer Froese	German	1950	-	Known for his work on the development and coordination of FishBase
George Brown Goode	American	1851	1896	Ichthyologist who organized and administered the biological and fishery development research of the United States Fish Commission and ordered and developed the taxonomic and ichthyologic work of both the Fish Commission and the Smithsonian Institution. U.S. Commissioner of Fish and Fisheries from 1887 to 1888.
Michael Graham	English	1889	1972	Known for his Great Law of Fishing, that "Fisheries that are unlimited become unprofitable."
Seth Green	American	1817	1888	Pioneer in fish farming who established the first fish hatchery in the United States
Gordon Gunter	American	1909	1998	Pioneer in fisheries research in the northern Gulf of Mexico
John Halver	American	1922	2012	His pioneering work on the nutritional needs of fish led to modern methods of fish farming and fish feed production. He has been called the father of fish nutrition.
Gotthilf Hempel	German	1929	-	Marine biologist and oceanographer, and co-founder of the Alfred Wegener Institute for Polar and Marine Research
Walther Herwig	German	1838	1912	Lawyer and promoter of high seas fishing and research
Hiralal Chaudhuri	Indian	1921	2014	Father of induced breeding of the Carp and also the pioneer of Blue revolution. Fisheries biologist with strong contributions in fisheries management.
Ray Hilborn	Canadian	1947	-	Fisheries biologist with strong contributions in fisheries management
Johan Hjort	Norwegian	1869	1948	Known for research to determine why northern European fish populations fluctuate in abundance
Bruno Hofer	German	1861	1916	Fishery scientist credited with being the founder of fish pathology
Sidney Holt	English	1926	2019	Fisheries biologist known for the Beverton–Holt model (with Ray Beverton), credited with being one of the founders of fisheries science
Uwe Kils	German		-	Marine biologist specializing in planktology. Inventor of the ecoSCOPE
Harry Macdonald Kyle	Scottish	1872	1951	Ichthyologist specializing in fisheries science and one of the earliest identifiers of the concept of overfishing
Robert T. Lackey	Canadian	1944	-	Fisheries scientist and political scientist known for his work involving the role of science in policy making
Peter Anthony Larkin	Canadian	1924	1996	Fisheries scientist known for his critical remarks on the concept of MSY
Rosa Lee	Welsh	1884	1976	One of the first UK women employed as a fisheries scientist. Known for "Rosa Lee's phenomenon," in which size-selective fishing mortality reduces the average size of older age classes
Jane Lubchenco	American	1947		Known for both her academic research in fisheries and related fields as well as policies implemented during her time as head of the U.S. National Oceanic and Atmospheric Administration
Leo Margolis	Canadian	1927	1997	Parasitologist and head of the Pacific Biological Station in Nanaimo, British Columbia
Marshall McDonald	American	1835	1895	Fisheries scientist and fish culturist who invented the fish ladder and of a number of fish-hatching apparatuses. U.S. Commissioner of Fish and Fisheries from 1888 to 1895.
R. J. McKay	Australian			Biologist and a specialist in translocated freshwater fishes
Garth I. Murphy	American	1922	2001	Fisheries oceanographer known for his work on the dynamics of Pacific sardine and on the importance of a broad age structure as a bed-hedging strategy in variable environments.
Ransom A. Myers	Canadian	1952	2007	Fisheries biologist best known for his work assessing the status of ocean fish populations
Daniel Pauly	French / Canadian	1946		Prominent fisheries scientist, known for his work studying human impacts on global fisheries
Tony J. Pitcher			-	Known for work on the impacts of fishing, management appraisals and the shoaling behavior of fish
Michael A. Rice	American	1955	-	Known for work on molluscan fisheries
Bill Ricker	Canadian	1908	2001	Fisheries biologist, known for the Ricker model, credited with being one of the founders of fisheries science
Ed Ricketts	American	1897	1948	A colourful marine biologist and philosopher who introduced ecology to fisheries science.
Callum Roberts			-	Marine conservation biologist, known for his work on the role marine reserves play in protecting marine ecosystems
Harald Rosenthal	German	1937	-	Hydrobiologist known for his work in fish farming and ecology
Carl Safina	American	1955	-	Author of several writings on marine ecology and the ocean
Georg Ossian Sars	Norwegian	1837	1927	Marine biologist credited with the discovery of a number of new species and known for his analysis of cod fisheries
Milner Baily Schaefer	American	1912	1970	Notable for work on the population dynamics of fisheries
Carl Schreck	American	1944	-	Fisheries scientist and endocrinologist known for his research on Pacific salmon
Tore Schweder	Norwegian	1943	-	Statistician whose work includes the assessment of marine resources
Oscar Elton Sette	American	1900	1972	Pioneered the integration of fisheries biology with oceanography and meteorology to create fisheries oceanography and modern fisheries science.
Bell M. Shimada	American	1922	1958	Notable for study of tuna stocks in the equatorial Pacific Ocean.
Hugh McCormick Smith	American	1865	1941	Ichthyologist who directed the United States Fish Commission's scientific research from 1897 to 1903 and served as its deputy commissioner from 1903 to 1913. U.S. Commissioner of Fish and Fisheries from 1913 to 1922. First director general of Thailand′s Department of Fisheries.
Ussif Rashid Sumaila	Nigerian		-	Notable for his analysis of the economic aspects of fisheries
Royal D. Suttkus	American	1920	2009	Founder of the Royal D. Suttkus Fish Collection, housed at Tulane University
Fred M. Utter	American	1931	-	Characterised by NOAA as the founding father of fishery genetics, he has been influential in marine conservation
Ludwig von Bertalanffy	Austrian	1901	1972	In fisheries, best known for the von Bertalanffy function
Carl Walters	American / Canadian	1944	-	Biologist known for his work involving fisheries stock assessments, the adaptive management concept, and ecosystem modeling

== Journals ==
Some journals about fisheries are

- Journal of Fisheries
- Fishery Bulletin
- Fisheries Oceanography Archived 2008-07-14 at the Wayback Machine
- Journal of the Fisheries Research Board
- Canadian Journal of Fisheries and Aquatic Sciences
- Transactions of the American Fisheries Society
- Fisheries Management and Ecology Archived 2008-06-12 at the Wayback Machine
- Fish and Fisheries Archived 2008-06-03 at the Wayback Machine
- Journal of Fish Biology Archived 2008-10-07 at the Wayback Machine
- Journal of Northwest Atlantic Fishery Science
- Journal of Fisheries and Aquatic Sciences
- The Open Fish Science Journal
- African Journal of Tropical Hydrobiology and Fisheries
- ICES Journal of Marine Science
- Reviews in Fisheries Science
  - Chinese Fisheries Journal Listings
  - General Fisheries Journal Listings

== Professional societies ==
- World Council of Fisheries Societies
- American Fisheries Society
- The International Council for the Exploration of the Sea (ICES)
- The Fisheries Society of the British Isles
- The Japanese Society of Fisheries Science
- The Australian Society for Fish Biology

== See also ==
- Aquaculture – Farming of aquatic organisms
- Fisheries management – Regulation of fishing
- International Council for the Exploration of the Sea – Intergovernmental science organization
- Fisheries Law – Regulations regarding fishing activities
- The Fisheries Law Centre

Categories:

- Fisheries and aquaculture research institutes
