= Pierre François Verhulst =

Belgian mathematician

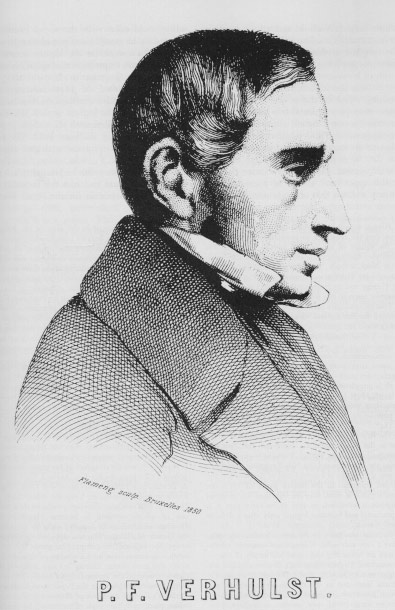
Pierre François Verhulst

Pierre François Verhulst (28 October 1804 – 15 February 1849) was a Belgian mathematician and a doctor in number theory from the University of Ghent in 1825. He is best known for the logistic growth model.

== Biography ==
Pierre François Verhulst was born in the French Empire, now Brussels. His family was a wealthy family, being able to give him a high-quality education and promoting his later career. He could obtain his doctorate on August 3rd in 1825.

== Logistic equation ==
Verhulst developed the logistic function in a series of three papers between 1838 and 1847, based on research on modeling population growth that he conducted in the mid-1830s, under the guidance of Adolphe Quetelet; see Logistic function § History for details.

Verhulst published in Verhulst (1838) the equation:

$$\frac{dN}{dt} = rN - \alpha N^2$$

where N(t) represents number of individuals at time t, r the intrinsic growth rate, and $\alpha$ is the density-dependent crowding effect (also known as intraspecific competition). In this equation, the population equilibrium (sometimes referred to as the carrying capacity, K), $N^*$, is

$$N^* = \frac{r}{\alpha}$$.

In Verhulst (1845) he named the solution the logistic curve.

Later, Raymond Pearl and Lowell Reed popularized the equation, but with a presumed equilibrium, K, as

$$\frac{dN}{dt} = r N \left(1 - \frac {N}{K} \right)$$

where K sometimes represents the maximum number of individuals that the environment can support. In relation to the density-dependent crowding effect, $\alpha = \frac{r}{K}$. The Pearl-Reed logistic equation can be integrated exactly, and has solution

$$N(t) = \frac{K}{1+ C K e^{-rt}}$$

where C = 1/N(0) − 1/K is determined by the initial condition N(0). The solution can also be written as a weighted harmonic mean of the initial condition and the carrying capacity,

$$\frac{1}{N(t)} = \frac{1-e^{-rt}}{K}+ \frac{e^{-rt}}{N(0)}.$$

Although the continuous-time logistic equation is often compared to the logistic map because of similarity of form, it is actually more closely related to the Beverton–Holt model of fisheries recruitment.

The concept of R/K selection theory derives its name from the competing dynamics of exponential growth and carrying capacity introduced by the equations above.

== See also ==
- Population dynamics
- Logistic map
- Logistic distribution

== Works ==
- Verhulst, Pierre-François (1838). "Notice sur la loi que la population suit dans son accroissement". Correspondance mathématique et physique. 10: 113–121.
- Verhulst, Pierre-François (1841). Traité élémentaire des fonctions elliptiques : ouvrage destiné à faire suite aux traités élémentaires de calcul intégral. Bruxelles: Hayez.
- Verhulst, Pierre-François (1845). "Recherches mathématiques sur la loi d'accroissement de la population" [Mathematical Researches into the Law of Population Growth Increase]. Nouveaux Mémoires de l'Académie Royale des Sciences et Belles-Lettres de Bruxelles. 18: 1–42. doi:10.3406/marb.1845.3438.
- Verhulst, Pierre-François (1847). "Deuxième mémoire sur la loi d'accroissement de la population". Mémoires de l'Académie Royale des Sciences, des Lettres et des Beaux-Arts de Belgique. 20: 1–32. doi:10.3406/marb.1847.3457.
