= Tatiana Baganova =

Russian choreographer

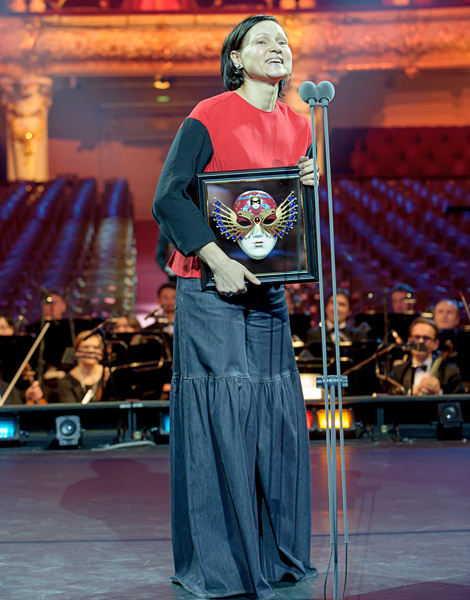
- Born: Tyumen Oblast, Russian SFSR, Soviet Union
- Education: Moscow Institute of Culture
- Occupations: Choreographer, dancer
- Known for: Contemporary dance, Provincial Dances Theatre
- Awards: Golden Mask Award

Tatiana Baganova is an international contemporary dance choreographer from the Tyumen Oblast region of Russia. Baganova is the artistic director of Yekaterinburg's Provincial Dances Theatre. She is also known for major choreographic works created both in Russia and internationally, including productions for the Bolshoi Theatre and the American Dance Festival.

== Early life and education ==
Baganova was born in the Tyumen Oblast of the RSFSR. She received her formal training at the Moscow Institute of Culture, graduating in 1990 with a degree in choreography and pedagogy.

In the early 1990s, she undertook extended professional residencies in the United States at the American Dance Festival (ADF) in North Carolina, where she studied contemporary choreography, directing, and participated in master classes with European and American teachers.

== Career ==
Following her graduation, Baganova joined the Yekaterinburg contemporary dance company Provincial Dances as a performer and choreographer, beginning a professional association that would shape her career from 1990 onward. She later became the company’s artistic director and played a central role in defining its artistic identity, overseeing the creation of more than ten original productions.

Under her leadership, Provincial Dances gained international recognition, with productions receiving awards at major international competitions and festivals in Hanover, Paris, and Vitebsk throughout the 1990s. Her staging of Igor Stravinsky’s Les Noces (The Wedding) became one of her most influential works, earning critical acclaim in Europe and Russia and receiving major awards at international festivals in France in 2000.

Baganova’s choreography has been commissioned and presented internationally in France, Spain, the Netherlands, Poland, Austria, and the United States. At the request of the American Dance Festival, she created multiple original works as part of its "International Choreographers" program, including Maple Garden, Wings at Tea, Post-Engagement, and Sepia, all of which were later incorporated into the repertory of Provincial Dances and toured internationally.

Baganova has choreographed productions for Russian opera and drama theatres, including works staged at theatres in Yekaterinburg, Novosibirsk, and Moscow during the late 1990s and early 2000s.

=== Bolshoi Theatre and international recognition ===
In 2013, Baganova was invited by the Bolshoi Theatre to create a new staging of Igor Stravinsky’s The Rite of Spring as part of the international project "Century of The Rite of Spring / Century of Modernism", marking the centenary of the ballet’s original premiere. The production placed her at the center of a major cultural event at a time of institutional crisis for the Bolshoi and was widely discussed in international media.

The production was praised for its physical intensity and contemporary reinterpretation of ritual themes, while remaining closely aligned with Stravinsky’s score.

That same year, the work received Russia’s National Theatre Award Golden Mask for Best Contemporary Dance Performance, as well as an additional award for stage design.

=== Teaching and professional activity ===
Alongside her choreographic work, Baganova has been active as a teacher and mentor, conducting workshops and serving as a juror at international and national choreography competitions and festivals. She has served on adjudication boards on multiple occasions. She has contributed to the professional training of contemporary dancers in Russia and abroad.

Baganova is a member of the Russian Theatre Union and has received awards from regional cultural institutions in the Sverdlovsk Oblast in recognition of her contribution to the performing arts.
