= Fish stocks =

Semi-discrete subpopulations of a particular species of fish

Global trends in the state of world marine fish stocks as reported by FAO 1974–2015

Fish stocks are subpopulations of a particular species of fish, for which intrinsic parameters (growth, recruitment, mortality and fishing mortality) are traditionally regarded as the significant factors determining the stock's population dynamics, while extrinsic factors (immigration and emigration) are traditionally ignored. Stocks fished within biologically sustainable levels decreased from 90% in 1974 to 62.3% in 2021.

== Concepts ==
=== The stock concept ===
All species have geographic limits to their distribution, which are determined by their tolerance to environmental conditions, and their ability to compete successfully with other species. In marine environments this may be less evident than on land because there are fewer topographical boundaries, however, discontinuities still exist, produced for example by mesoscale and sub-mesoscale circulations that minimize long-distance dispersal of fish larvae.

For fish, it is rare for an individual to reproduce randomly with all other individuals of that species within its biological range. There is a tendency to form a structured series of discrete populations which have a degree of reproductive isolation from each other in space, in time, or in both. This isolation is reflected in the development between sub-populations of genetic differences, morphological variations and exposure to different chemical regimes and parasitic species. Sub-populations also respond to fishing in such a way that fishing on one population appears to have no effect on the population dynamics of a neighbouring population.

The currently accepted definition of a stock in fisheries science, is that of Begg et al. (1999), "... [a 'stock'] describes characteristics of semi-discrete groups of fish with some definable attributes which are of interest to fishery managers."

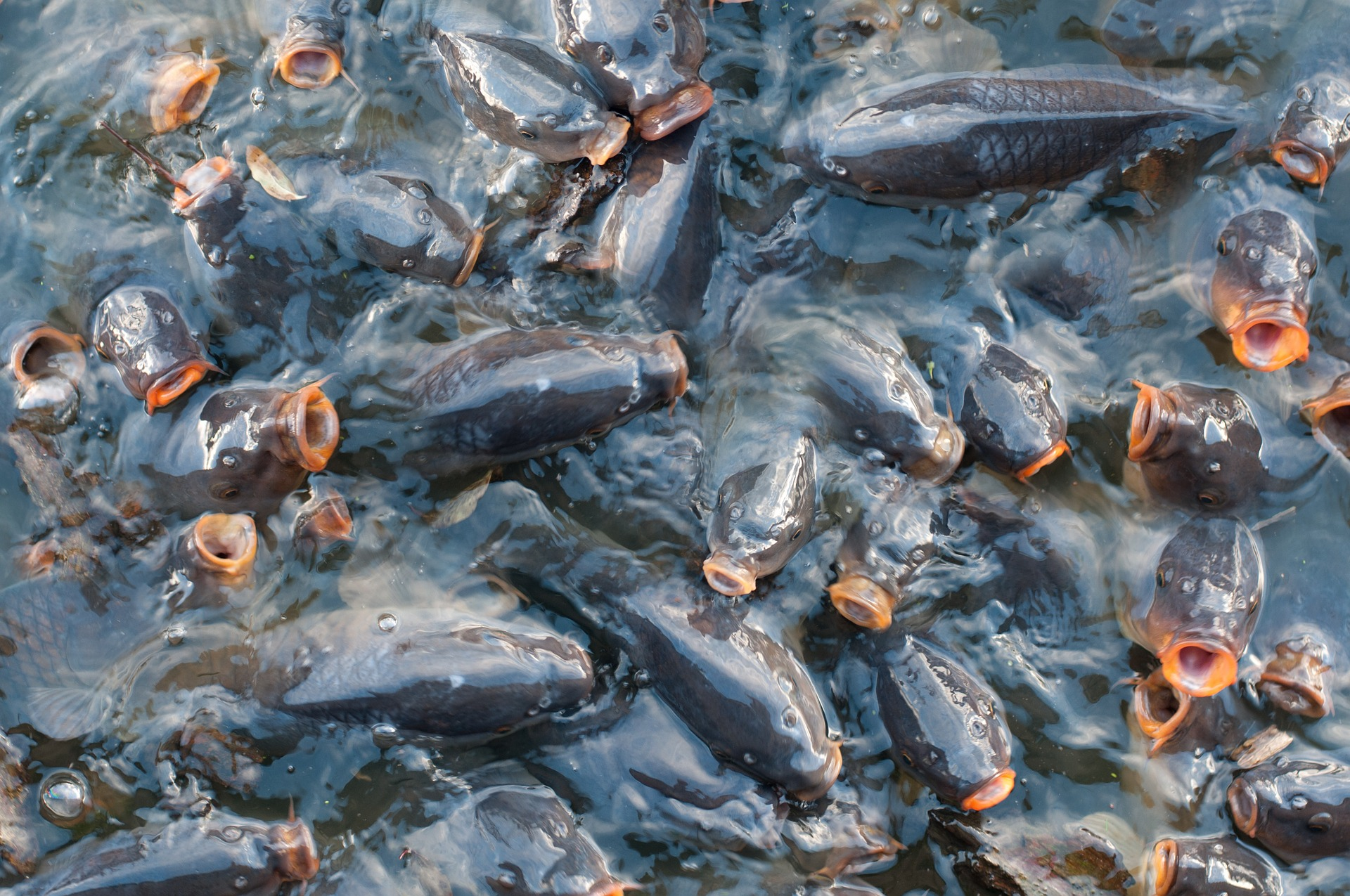
School of carp struggling to the surface

Stock identification is a field of fisheries science which aims to identify these subpopulations, based on a number of techniques. This concept is applied in sustainable development goal 14 where target 14.4 is measured a fish stock sustainability indicator 14.4.1.

=== Straddling stock ===
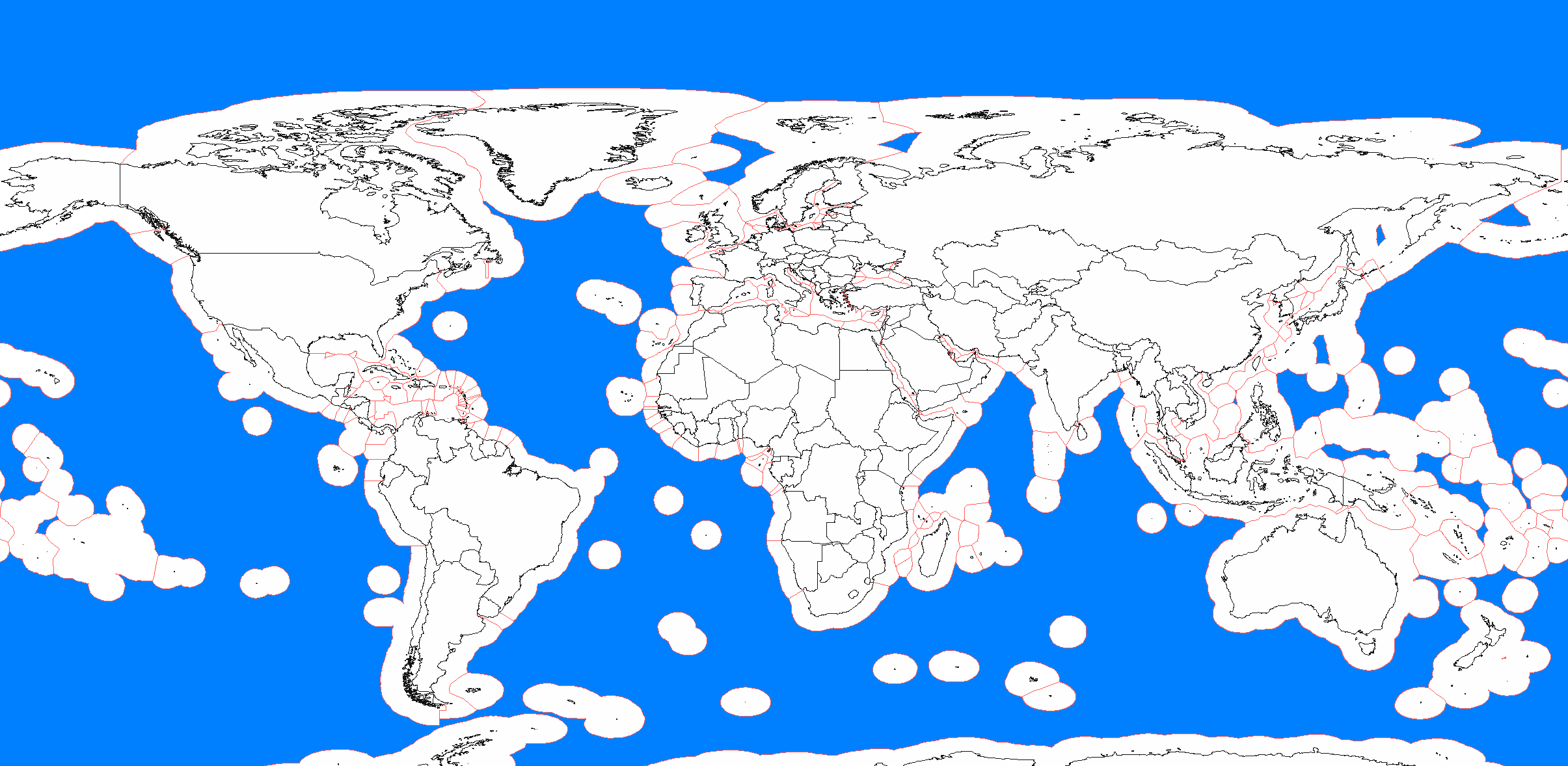
The high seas, or international waters, are highlighted in blue.

The United Nations defines straddling stocks as "stocks of fish such as pollock, which migrate between, or occur in both, the economic exclusion zones (EEZ) of one or more states and the high seas". Sovereign responsibility must be worked out in collaboration with neighbouring coastal states and fishing entities. Usually this is done through the medium of an intergovernmental regional organisation set up for the purpose of coordinating the management of that stock.

Straddling stocks are usually pelagic, rather than demersal. Demersal species move less than pelagic species, since they tend to relate to bottom topography. Pelagic species are more mobile, their movements influenced by ocean temperatures and the availability of zooplankton as food. Example pelagic fish are capelin, herring, whiting, mackerel and redfish, There are, however, a few demersal species that are straddling, such as the Greenland halibut migrates in feeding/spawning migrations to Greenland in the west and to the Faeroes in the east.

Straddling stock can be compared with transboundary stock. Straddling stock range both within an EEZ as well as in the high seas. Transboundary stock range in the EEZs of at least two countries. A stock can be both transboundary and straddling.

== Assessments ==
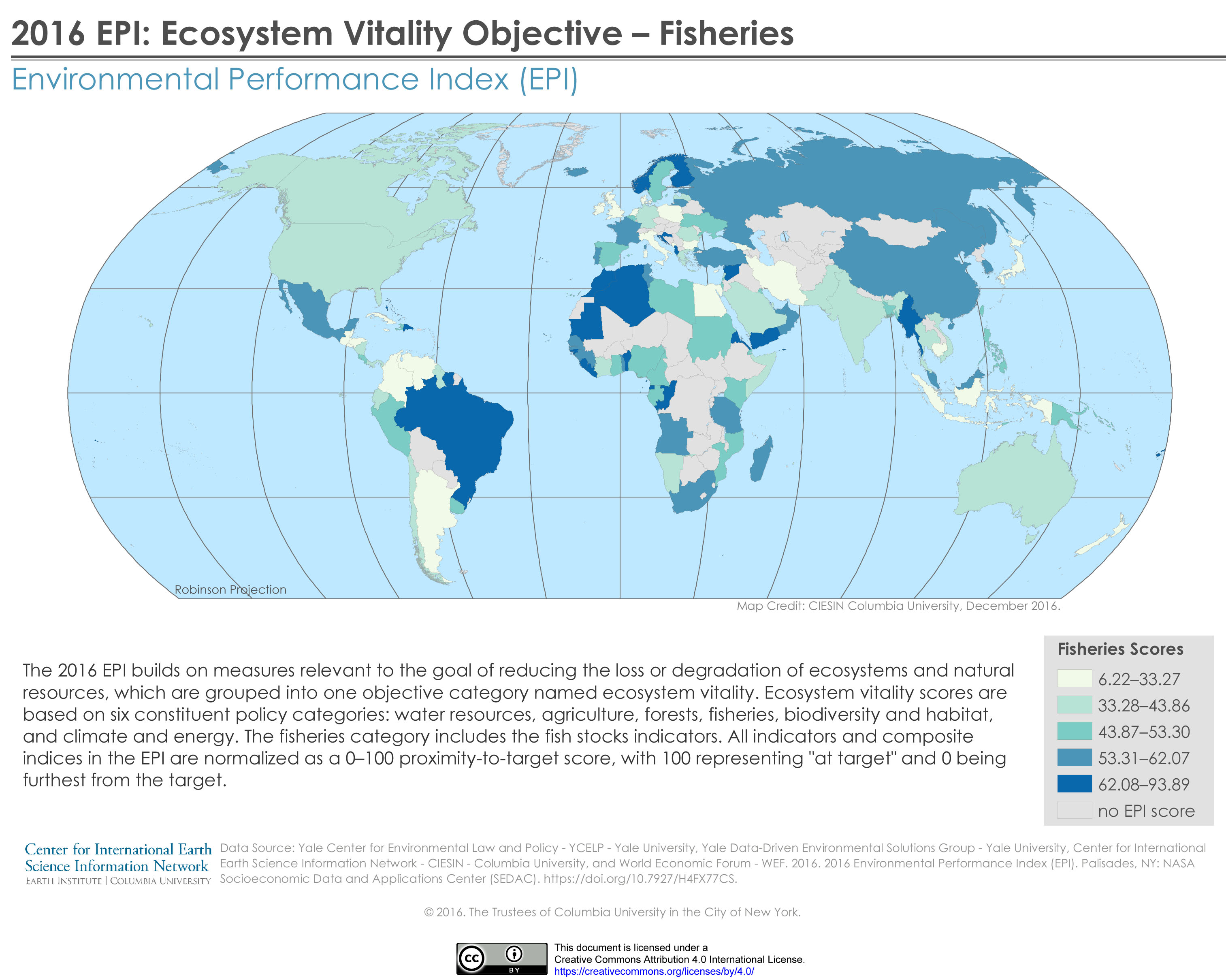
Fish stocks indicators, which is normalized as a 0–100 proximity-to-target score, with 100 representing "at target" and 0 being furthest from the target.

In fisheries science and ecology, stock assessment is an important tool in fisheries management.

In particular, to ensure continued, healthy, fish stocks, measurements of the spawning stock biomass (the stock population capable of reproducing) allows sensible conservation strategies to be developed and maintained through the application of sustainable fishing quotas.

The World Wildlife Fund and the Zoological Society of London jointly issued their "Living Blue Planet Report" on 16 September 2015 which states that there was a dramatic fall of 74% in world-wide stocks of the important scombridae fish such as mackerel, tuna and bonitos between 1970 and 2010, and the global overall "population sizes of mammals, birds, reptiles, amphibians and fish fell by half on average in just 40 years." It is hoped that global efforts like the United Nations Sustainable Development Goal 14 meets its targets aimed at reversing these trends.

The UN Food and Agriculture Organization found that stocks fished within biologically sustainable levels decreased from 90% in 1974 to 62.3% in 2021.

== Fluctuations ==
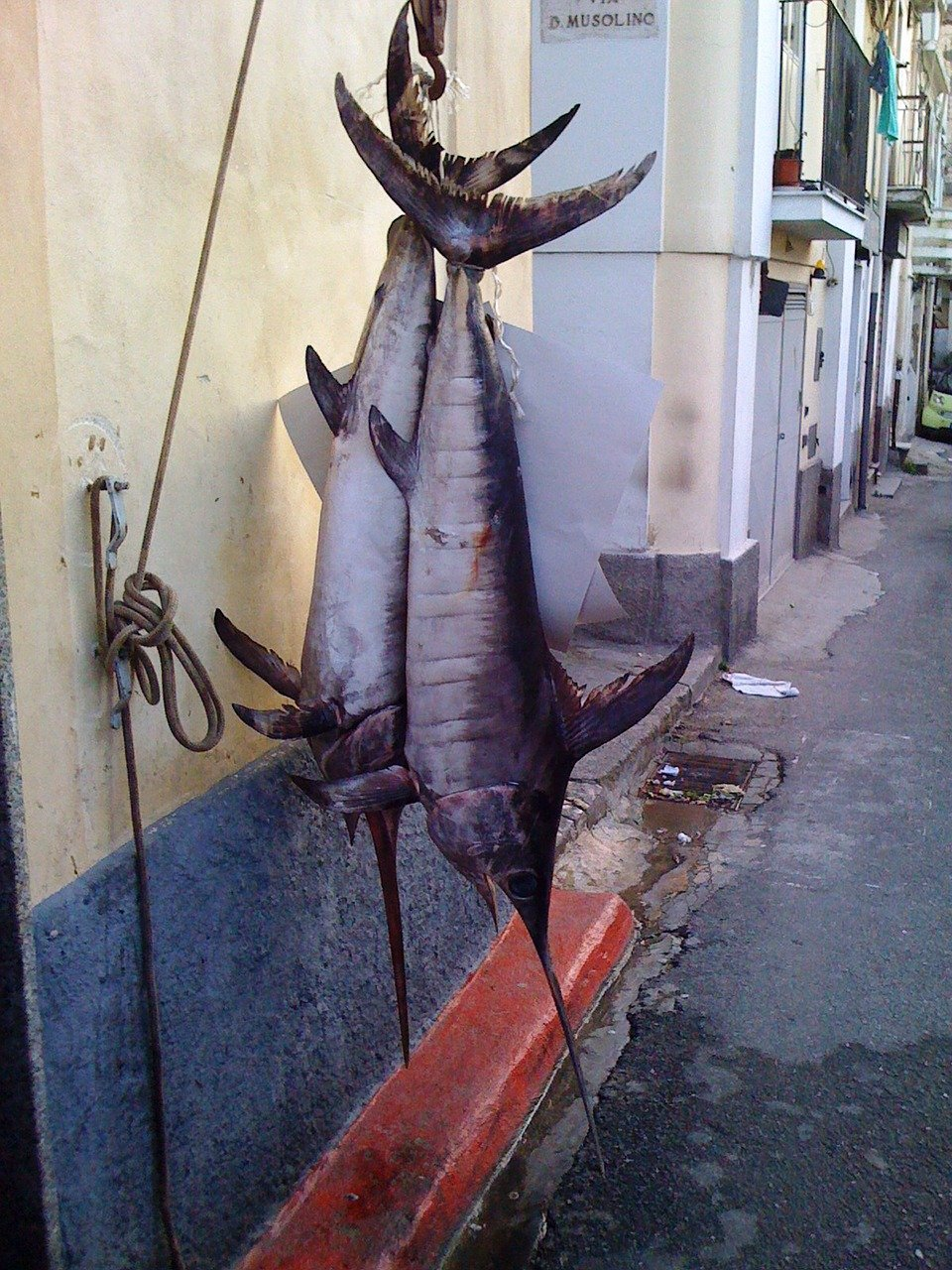
Two dead swordfish hanging from their tails

The stocks for individual marine species can "boom and bust" in linked and compensatory ways. For example, in billfish longline fisheries, the Atlantic catch of blue marlin declined in the 1960s. This was accompanied by an increase in sailfish catch. The sailfish catch then declined from the end of the 1970s to the end of the 1980s, compensated by an increase in swordfish catch. As a result, the overall billfish catch remained fairly stable. At Georges Bank, a decline in cod during the 1960s was accompanied by a rise in flatfish, and with the collapse of the predatory Atlantic cod in the 1980s lobster catches in Maine temporarily boomed although catches have plummeted by over 31 million pounds in the period between 2021 and 2025, the lowest catch since 2008.

== See also ==
- List of harvested aquatic animals by weight
- Overfishing

== Sources ==
This article incorporates text from a free content work. Licensed under CC BY-SA 3.0 IGO (license statement/permission). Text taken from In brief, The State of World Fisheries and Aquaculture, 2018, FAO, FAO.
