= Villy Christensen =

Canadian biologist

- Education: Copenhagen University
- Known for: Developing Ecopath
- Scientific career
- Fields: Ecosystem modelling, fisheries science
- Workplaces: UBC Fisheries Centre, University of British Columbia
- Doctoral advisor: Sven Erik Jørgensen

Villy Christensen is an ecosystem modeller with a background in fisheries science. He is known for his work as a project leader and core developer of Ecopath, an ecosystem modelling software system widely used in fisheries management. Ecopath was initially an initiative of the NOAA, but since primarily developed at the UBC Fisheries Centre of the University of British Columbia. In 2007, it was named as one of the ten biggest scientific breakthroughs in NOAA's 200-year history. The citation states that Ecopath "revolutionized scientists' ability worldwide to understand complex marine ecosystems".

== Biography ==
Christensen did his Ph.D. under Sven Erik Jørgensen at Copenhagen University. Jeffrey Polovina initiated the Ecopath approach in the early 1980s. Christensen, along with Daniel Pauly and others, has been involved in the subsequent development of Ecopath since 1990.

Christensen currently facilitates international workshops on Ecopath around the world. He is a professor at the UBC Fisheries Centre at the University of British Columbia, specialising in ecosystem modelling. His main project is with the Sea Around Us Project working on "database-driven ecosystem model construction", with the aim of using "global, spatial databases to parameterize, balance and fit ecosystem models". This work includes developing a dynamic exchange model of biomass over time in the Chesapeake Bay area, as well as how marine protected areas can be optimally positioned. He is also director of the Lenfest Ocean Futures Project, where a visualization system is being developed to support decision making in ecosystem-based fisheries management. This system combines Blender, a 3D-gaming engine, with Ecopath.

== Selected papers ==
- Wilson RW, Millero FJ, Taylor JR, Walsh PJ, Christensen V, Jennings S and Grosell M (2009) "Contribution of Fish to the Marine Inorganic Carbon Cycle" Science, 323 (5912) 359–362. (This article provides a first estimate of global fish biomass)
- Pauly D, Christensen V, Dalsgaard J, Froese R and Torres F (1998) "Fishing down marine food webs" Science, 279: 860–863.
- Pauly D and Christensen V (1995) "Primary production required to sustain global fisheries" Archived 2008-04-18 at the Wayback Machine Nature 374(6519): 255–257.
- Christensen V (1996) "Managing fisheries involving top predator and prey species components" Review in Fish Biology and Fisheries, 6:417-442. (First published description of "fishing down the food web" concept)
- Christensen V (1995) "Ecosystem maturity - towards quantification" Ecological Modelling, 77: 3-32.
- Christensen V and Pauly D (1992) "ECOPATH II - A software for balancing steady-state ecosystem models and calculating network characteristics" Ecological Modelling, 61:169-185. (Third-most cited paper in this journal)
- Refereed publications
- Non-refereed publications
- Books and reports
