= Ray Hilborn =

Canadian marine biologist and fisheries scientist

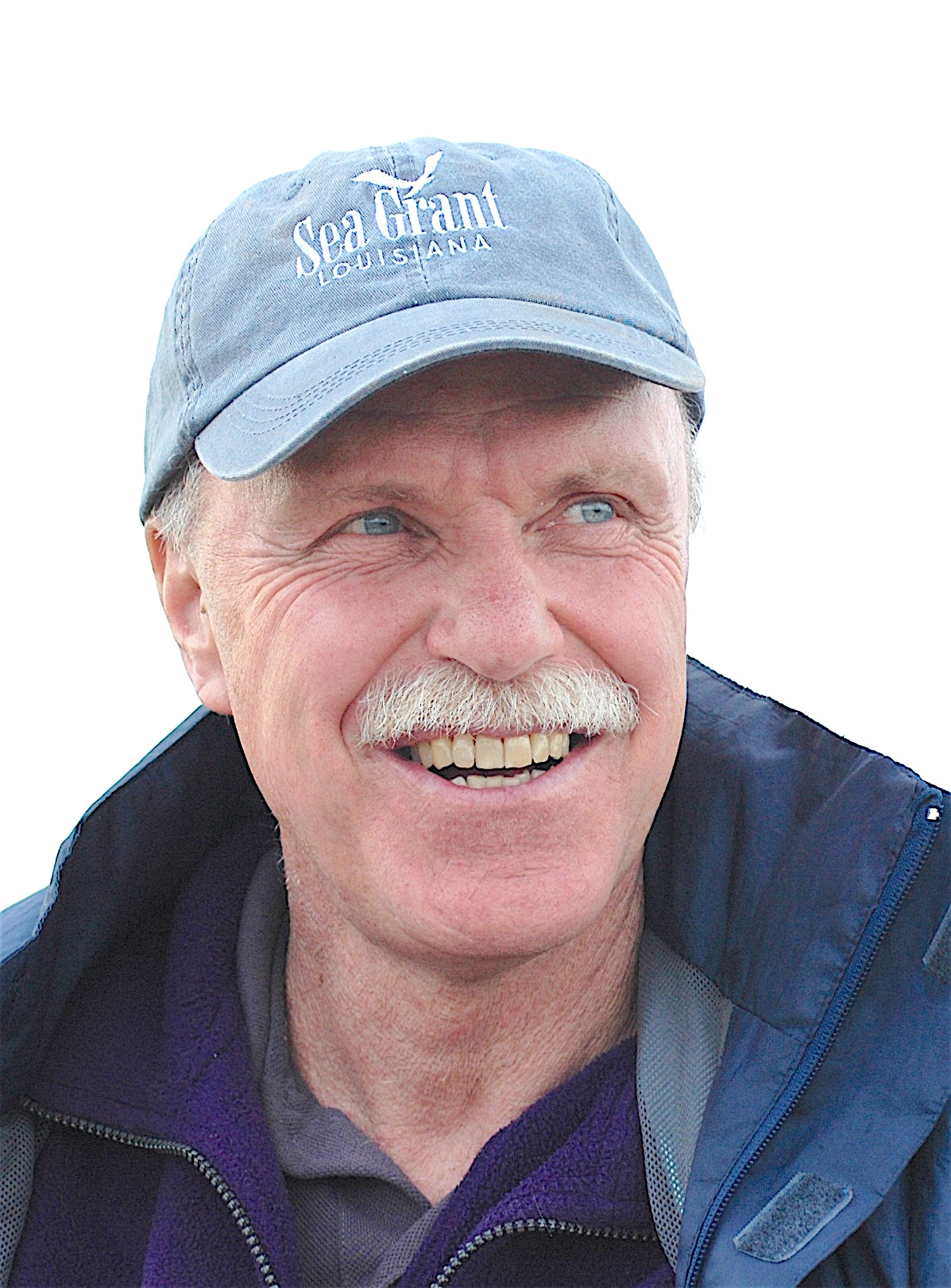
- Born: December 31, 1947 (age 78)
- Education: Grinnell College; University of British Columbia
- Known for: His work on fisheries research
- Awards: Fellow of the Royal Society of Canada; Volvo Environment Prize (2006)
- Scientific career
- Fields: Marine biology, fisheries science
- Workplaces: University of Washington

Ray Hilborn (born 1947) is a marine biologist and fisheries scientist, known for his work on conservation and natural resource management in the context of fisheries. He is currently professor of aquatic and fishery science at the University of Washington. He focuses on conservation, natural resource management, fisheries stock assessment and risk analysis, and advises several international fisheries commissions and agencies.

== Biography ==
Ray Hilborn has authored more than 200 peer-reviewed scientific papers, and several books.

In 1992, Hilborn coauthored Quantitative fisheries stock assessment with Carl Walters. In 1997, he coauthored The Ecological Detective: Confronting Models with Data with Marc Mangel. In 2012, he coauthored Overfishing: what everyone needs to know with Ulrike Hilborn.

With Carl Walters, he jointly received the Wildlife Society award for best paper in fish ecology and management, Adaptive control of fishing systems.

In 2006, he shared the Volvo Environment Prize with Daniel Pauly and Carl Walters. He is a Fellow of the Royal Society of Canada.

In 2011, he received the Ecological Society of America's Sustainability Science Award for a 2009 paper with Boris Worm and others entitled Rebuilding global fisheries.

In 2016 he received the International Fisheries Science Prize at the World Fisheries Congress in Busan, South Korea. The award recognized his 40-year career of "highly diversified research and publication in support of global fisheries science and conservation," according to a news release.

His major areas of current and past research interest include "Bayesian analysis of decision making in natural resources, adaptive management of renewable resources, the dynamics of the Serengeti ecosystem in east Africa, the role of hatcheries in management of Pacific salmon, the ability of institutions to learn from experience, statistical methods in testing dynamic ecological hypotheses, the analysis of migration and dispersal from mark–recapture data, and the ecological dynamics of fishing fleets."

== Fisheries management research ==
In their research, Hilborn and Walters investigated the ways that dynamic models can be used to manage fisheries in order to maintain states of optimum equilibrium. In their paper, they examined the effectiveness of using the Ricker and Beverton-Holt models models to estimate the potential yield of future generations by using data taken from prior generations. They addressed the problem that, in regards to fisheries, the parameters of the control system are often either varied or uncertain and the use of historical data becomes progressively more unreliable as it gets older. Variables, regarding these issues, include natural mortality and spawning rates as well the effects of human fishing, as a predator-prey relationship. Influenced by control theory, Hilborn and Walters modified the original models with various new formulae to create alternative models, in order to achieve more accurate predictions. They then identified "a series of alternative harvesting experiments… each of which would be reasonably certain to discriminate between the alternative models…" The development of these alternative models and harvesting methods has been invaluable in assessing the sustainability of the world's fisheries.

Hilborn's research "aims to identify how to best manage fisheries to provide sustainable benefits to human society. This involves a combination of building data bases on how fisheries are managed and measures of their performance." He has contributed extensively to The Ram Legacy database which "provides estimates of status indicators such as biomass, fishing mortality rates, and associated reference points, and is the most quantitatively robust source of fishery status available." Hilborn's efforts attempt to strike a balance between resource sustainability for the environment and food and nutrition security for human beings. When it comes to large scale management of fisheries, he contends that there is "no single solution, and what is appropriate for one community for a specific species may be totally different for another species or community" According to Hilborn, successful management strategies involve a combination of limiting access to fisheries, maintaining biological productivity and the cooperation of all stakeholders involved.

== Controversy ==
In 2016 in a publicly posted 8-page letter to the President of the University of Washington, Greenpeace USA accused Dr. Hilborn of conflict of interest in the conduct of his research about the effects of fishing on the health of fish populations. Greenpeace alleged that undisclosed research and consulting funding provided to Dr. Hilborn from the seafood industry had influenced his research. Hilborn denied the charges and was cleared after formal investigation by the University of Washington.

In October 2017 the NOAA Assistant Administrator for Fisheries wrote an open letter to the journal Marine Policy about a published paper co-authored by Tony J. Pitcher which suggested the U.S. exports to Japan a significant amount of seafood products from illegal, unreported, and unregulated fishing (IUU). The NOAA letter said it "strongly objects to the authors' claims regarding U.S. seafood exports to Japan and doubts the validity of the methodology used to make such estimates." In January 2019, Marine Policy had retracted the study, and the article was formally retracted by the editor of Marine Policy in September 2019. The following month a revised version of the article was published in the same journal. In the same issue Ray Hilborn et al. contested the credibility of the estimates in the revised paper, on the grounds that, "their estimates are not substantiated by any known facts from the fishery". Pitcher et al. countered by saying that instead of relying solely on public information supplied by the fishery, they had used "necessarily confidential sources (over 120 interviews) [which described] the procedures being used in laundering 27 IUU fish products".

== Publications ==
- Hilborn, Ray (2016). "Of mice, fishermen, and food†". ICES Journal of Marine Science. 73 (9): 2167–2173. doi:10.1093/icesjms/fsw099.
- Hilborn, Ray (2006). "Fisheries success and failure: the case of the Bristol Bay salmon fishery". Bulletin of Marine Science. 78 (3): 487–498.
- Hilborn, Ray (2006) "Faith-based Fisheries" Fisheries, 31(11):554-555.
- Hilborn, Ray (2007) "Moving to sustainability by learning from successful fisheries" Ambio, 36(4): 296–303.
- Ludwig D, Hilborn R and Walters C (1993) "Uncertainty, Resource Exploitation, and Conservation: Lessons from History" Science, 260(2):17.
- Hilborn, Ray (2006) "Defining success in fisheries and conflicts in objectives" Marine Policy, 31(2) 153–158.
- Prince J and Hilborn R (2003) "The Development of Industry Based Sustainability" Surveys for the Californian Sea Urchin Fishery Advisory Committee.
- Hilborn, Ray "Research in fisheries management: who decides, who pays, and how much" Advice to a commission.
- Hilborn R, Stokes K, Maguire JJ, Smith T, Botsford LW, Mangel M, Orensanz J, Parma A, Rice J, Bell J, Cochrane KL, Garcia S, Hall SJ, Kirkwood GP, Sainsbury K, Stefansson G and Walters C (2004) "When can marine reserves improve fisheries management?" Ocean and Coastal Management, 47: 197–205.
- Full list of publications
