= Carl Walters =

American-born Canadian biologist (born 1944)

- Born: Carl John Walters; Albuquerque, New Mexico, US
- Education: Colorado State University
- Known for: Fisheries stock assessments, adaptive management, ecosystem modeling
- Awards: Fellow of the Royal Society of Canada (1998), Mote Eminent Scholar at FSU (2000-2001), Pew Fellow in Marine Conservation (2001), Murray A. Newman Award for Marine Conservation (2005), Volvo Environment Prize (2006), American Fisheries Society Award of Excellence (2006), Timothy R. Parsons Medal (2007), Order of British Columbia (2019), UBC Emeritus Award for Excellence in Innovative and Creative Endeavours (2026)
- Scientific career
- Fields: Zoology, fisheries science, population ecology
- Workplaces: UBC Fisheries Centre, University of British Columbia
- Doctoral advisor: Robert E. Vincent

Carl Walters (born 1944) is an American-born Canadian biologist known for his work involving fisheries stock assessments, the adaptive management concept, and ecosystem modeling. Walters has been a professor of Zoology and Fisheries at the University of British Columbia since 1969. He is one of the main developers of the ecological modelling software Ecopath. His most recent work focuses on how to adjust human behaviors in environments that are full of uncertainty. He is a recent recipient of the Volvo Environment Prize (2006). In 2019, Dr. Walters became a Member of the Order of British Columbia.

== Education ==
Carl Walters graduated from Bakersfield College with an A.A in 1963 and continued to Humboldt State College to graduate with a B.S. in 1965. After Walters graduated, he went to Colorado State University to study the "Distribution and production of midges in an alpine lake" under the advisement of Dr. Robert E. Vincent. After obtaining his M.S. in 1967, Walters stayed on with R.E. Vincent to get his doctorate on the "Effects of fish introduction on invertebrate fauna of an alpine lake" and graduated in 1969. Walters did not go on for a postdoctoral position; instead he almost immediately started working at the University of British Columbia in Vancouver, British Columbia, Canada.

== Career ==
Walters's first professorship was at the University of British Columbia as an Assistant Professor in the UBC Institute for Animal Resource Ecology. In 1977, he became an Associate Professor and then a Professor in 1982. Prior to his professional appointment at UBC, Walters worked for the California Department of Fish and Game and was also a graduate fellow, a consultant, and an aide on numerous occasions. He has taken sabbaticals to the International Institute of Applied Systems Analysis in Vienna, the University of Florida, where he is an adjunct professor, and Australia. He has been on the editorial board for multiple journals including the Canadian Journal of Fisheries and Aquatic Sciences, Conservation Ecology, and Ecosystems and has been the associate editor of the Journal of Applied Mathematics and Computation and the Northwest Environmental Journal. He was the editor of the Open Fish Science Journal. Walters also served, and continues to serve, as a consultant to many government agencies.

== Interests ==
Walters uses mathematical modeling to understand how to successfully manage harvestable fisheries in a time of high uncertainty. He specializes in fisheries stock assessments (e.g cod, salmon, anchoveta), adaptive management strategies, and ecosystem modeling. One of his goals has been, and continues to be, to try to bridge the gap between fisheries management, government, and fishing industries in order to provide accurate information to use in successfully and actively managing fisheries. His work in modeling population dynamics and active adaptive management has made Walters a valuable member of the scientific community.

== Contributions ==
=== Foraging Arena Theory ===
Other modeling equations like the Beverton-Holt model and the "hockey stick" model by Barrowman and Myers (2000) try to explain density dependent effects of juvenile fish populations using processes like recruitment and the number of eggs produced. Fisheries biologists and population ecologists have used the Beverton-Holt model since the 1960s to describe the "stock-recruitment" relationship. However, Walters believed that juvenile behavior could also explain the density dependent relationship that Beverton and Holt and Barrowman and Myers described. Walters thought that juvenile behavior, in conjunction with habitat, could explain the density dependency seen when foraging for prey and avoiding predators. Walters wanted to give scientists a better understanding of the processes that drive density dependent fluctuations in ecosystem statistics (birth and death rates). The foraging arena theory is also used, in conjunction with the ecosystem simulation program Ecopath with Ecosim, to account for the indirect effects and trophic cascades seen in populations.

=== Adaptive management ===
One of Walters biggest concerns in the rapidly changing environment is how managers can successfully manage fisheries stocks in lieu of the uncertainty in making decisions. His concept of active adaptive management involves large-scale experimentation, or "learning-by-doing", in order to understand the population dynamics in fish communities and to aide in the decision-making process done by policy makers. Walters encourages other scientists, managers, and policy makers to embrace the uncertainty in experiments and decisions and to develop ecosystem models based on the uncertainties in order to make multiple hypotheses instead of just one hypothesis. Although active adaptive management has gained much support from the scientific community, there is still great hesitation from scientists and managers to implement these large-scale experiments. These hesitations arise from large monetary costs for the experiments as well as the monitoring of the experiments, lack of an individual willing to take on the daunting task of organizing the experiments, the limitations of models to perfectly represent an ecosystem, and the conflicting ecological values between different interest groups. Although there are concerns when executing active adaptive management strategies, there is a growing need to modify the current methods for exploring and understanding ecosystems, especially on a larger scale, and active adaptive management strategies aim to do exactly that.

== Selected publications ==
Books

- Walters, C.J. 1986. Adaptive Management of Renewable Resources. MacMillan Pub. Co, New York, USA. (374 pp).
- Hilborn, R. and Walters C.J. 1991. Quantitative Fisheries Stock Assessment and Management. Chapman-Hall, Pub. Co., New York, USA. (580 pp).
- Walters C.J. and Martell S. 2004. Fisheries Ecology and Management. Princeton, New Jersey, Princeton University Press.

Journal publications

- Walters C.J. and Juanes F. 1993. "Recruitment limitation as a consequence of optimal risk-taking behaviour by juvenile fish." Can. J. Fish. Aquat. Sci. 50:2058-2070.
- Walters, C.J. 1997. "Challenges in adaptive management of riparian and coastal ecosystems." Conservation Ecology (online) 1(2): 1.
- Walters, C.J. and Green, R. 1997. "Valuing large scale management experiments for natural resources." J. Wildl. Mgmt. 61:987-1006.
- Walters C.J. and Korman J. 1999. "Revisiting the Beverton-Holt recruitment model from a life history and multispecies perspective." Rev. Fish Biol. Fisheries 9:187-202.
- Pauly D., Christensen V., Walters C.J. 2000. "Ecopath, ecosim, and ecospace as tools for evaluating ecosystem impact of fisheries." ICES J. Mar. Sci. 57:697-706.
- Walters C.J. 2001. "Implications for marine population and community dynamics of natural selection for predation avoidance tactics." Marine Ecology Progress series. 208:309-313.
- Walters C.J. and Martell S.J.D. 2002. "Stock assessment needs for sustainable fisheries management." Bulletin of marine science. 70(2): 629.
- Christensen V. and Walters C.J. 2004. "Trade-offs in Ecosystem-scale Optimization of Fisheries Management Policies." Bulletin of Marine Science. 74(3): 549-562.
- Walters C.J. 2005. "Is Adaptive Management Helping to Solve Fisheries Problems?" Can. J. Fish. Aquat. Sci. 62(6): 1320-1336.
- Coggins L.G., Catalano M.J., Allen M.S., Pine W.E., Walters C.J. 2007. "Effects of cryptic mortality and the hidden costs of using length limits in fishery management." Fish and Fisheries. 8(3): 196-210.

== Awards ==
- Wildlife Society award for best paper in fish ecology and management: Walters, C.J. and Hilborn R. 1976. Adaptive control of fishing systems, J. Fish. Res. Bd. Canada 33(1): 145-159.
- Fellow of the Royal Society of Canada (1998)
- Pew Fellow in Marine Conservation (2001–2004)
- Mote Eminent Scholar - Florida State University and Mote Marine Laboratory (2001–2002)
- Murray A. Newman Award for Marine Conservation (Vancouver Aquarium) (2005)
- Volvo Environment Prize - shared with Daniel Pauly and Ray Hilborn (2006)
- American Fisheries Society Award of Excellence (2006)
- Timothy R. Parsons Medal (2007)
- University of British Columbia, Killam Teaching Prize (2009)
- Canadian Aquatic Resources Section, American Fisheries Society, Legend of Canadian Fisheries Science and management (2014)
- International Council for the Exploration of the Sea (ICES) Prix d'Excellence (2014)
- Member of the Order of British Columbia (2019)
- UBC Emeritus Award for Excellence in Innovative and Creative Endeavours (2026)
