= Amulya Reddy =

Indian scientist and professor (1930–2006)

- Born: 21 October 1930; Bangalore
- Died: 7 May 2006 (aged 75); Bangalore
- Occupations: Scientist, professor

Amulya Kumar N. Reddy (21 October 1930 – 7 May 2006) was a scientist and professor at the Indian Institute of Science (IISc). Born in Bangalore, India, he received his doctorate from Imperial College London and joined the IISc in 1967. He established a center for Application of Science and Technology in Rural Areas, and worked on rural technology. During his career, he authored over 250 academic papers and won the Volvo Environment Prize. Reddy died in 2006.

== Early life ==
Amulya Kumar N. Reddy was born on 21 October 1930, in Bangalore, India. His father, Narayana Reddy, was a supporter of Mahatma Gandhi and participated in the Indian independence movement. His uncle, Sir Cattamanchi Ramalinga Reddy, was an author and the first vice chancellor of Andhra University.

== Education and career ==
Reddy received his PhD in electrochemistry from Imperial College London under the supervision of John Bockris. Together with Bockris, Reddy authored two volumes of Modern Electrochemistry. From 1961 to 1966, he was a post-doctoral fellow at the University of Pennsylvania. He joined the Indian Institute of Science (IISc), Bangalore, in 1967, and worked in the Department of Inorganic and Physical Chemistry. An extension of IISc was set up in a village, Ungra, intended to study the problems related to rural energy. Reddy set up a biogas plant at Ungra and researched to improve efficiency of stove. In 1974, Reddy established a center for Application of Science and Technology in Rural Areas (ASTRA) at IISc, with the intention to work on rural technology.

Reddy worked together with Thomas Johansson, José Goldemberg, and Robert H. Williams in 1987. They jointly published a study titled "Energy for a Sustainable World". The work later earned them the Volvo Environment Prize. During his career, Reddy authored over 250 academic papers.

== Later life and death ==
After the Pokhran-II test in 1998, Reddy was one of the few scientists to speak against the nuclear test, saying: "Scientists must be involved in new coalition of people against the militaristic turn in the affairs of the nation." Reddy died on 7 May 2006, due to chronic kidney failure.

== Selected works ==
Articles

- Reddy, Amulya (1978). "Energy Options for the Third World". Bulletin of the Atomic Scientists. 34 (5): 28–33. doi:10.1080/00963402.1978.11458506. ISSN 0096-3402.
- ——————— (1981). "A Strategy for Resolving India's Oil Crisis". Current Science. 50 (2): 50–53. ISSN 0011-3891. JSTOR 24086283.
- ——————— (1990). "Funding Fundamental Research". Current Science. 59 (3): 133. ISSN 0011-3891. JSTOR 24092949.
- ——————— (1992). "In Defence of DEFENDUS". Economic and Political Weekly. 27 (3): 121–128. ISSN 0012-9976. JSTOR 41625364.
- Reddy, Amulya; D'Sa, Antonette; Sumithra, Gladys D.; Balachandra, P. (1995). "Integrated energy planning: Part II. Examples of DEFENDUS scenarios" (PDF). Energy for Sustainable Development. 2 (4): 12–26. doi:10.1016/S0973-0826(08)60147-7. ISSN 0973-0826.

Books

- Reddy, Amulya (1980). Rural Technology. Indian Academy of Sciences.
- Goldemberg, José; Johansson, Thomas; Reddy, Amulya; Williams, Robert H. (1987). Energy for a Sustainable World (PDF). World Resources Institute. ISBN 978-0-915825-21-9.
