= Tony J. Pitcher =

Canadian biologist

Tony J Pitcher
- Education: Oxford University
- Known for: Founding director: UBC Fisheries Centre; Founder: Fish and Fisheries; Founder: Reviews in Fish Biology and Fisheries; Fishing down the deep
- Awards: 2003: Beverton Medal; 2005: Distinguished Service Award of the AFS
- Scientific career
- Fields: Marine biology, fisheries science
- Workplaces: UBC Institute for the Oceans and Fisheries; University of British Columbia; Peter Wall Institute for Advanced Studies

Tony J Pitcher is a fisheries scientist, well known for his work on the impacts of fishing, the management appraisal of fisheries, and how shoaling behaviour impacts fisheries.

He is the founding director of the UBC Fisheries Centre at the University of British Columbia, which was dissolved in 2015 and incorporated into the UBC Institute for the Oceans and Fisheries, where he is currently a professor.

== Career ==
In 1989, Pitcher founded the journal Reviews in Fish Biology and Fisheries. In 2000, he founded another journal, the quarterly Fish and Fisheries. This journal has the highest impact factor in its field fisheries.

In 2003 Pitcher was awarded the Beverton Medal by the Fisheries Society of the British Isles for his contributions to the understanding of fish and fisheries. In 2005 he was given the Distinguished Service Award by the American Fisheries Society for his work as Chair of the Programme Committee of the 4th World Fisheries Congress. In 2008 he was Distinguished Scholar in Residence at the Peter Wall Institute for Advanced Studies.

Pitcher has been a visiting professor at the University of Concepcion, Chile and a member of the Advisory Board of the Max Planck Institute for Evolutionary Biology in Ploen.. He was the Senior Scientific Advisor and Chair of the Advisory Council of the FishSource initiative.

== Controversy ==
In October 2017 the NOAA Assistant Administrator for Fisheries wrote an open letter to the journal Marine Policy about a published paper co-authored by Pitcher which suggested the U.S. exports to Japan a significant amount of seafood products from illegal, unreported, and unregulated fishing (IUU). The NOAA letter said it "strongly objects to the authors' claims regarding U.S. seafood exports to Japan and doubts the validity of the methodology used to make such estimates." In January 2019, Marine Policy had retracted the study, and the article was formally retracted by the editor of Marine Policy in September 2019. The following month a revised version of the article was published in the same journal. In the same issue Ray Hilborn et al. contested the credibility of the estimates in the revised paper, on the grounds that, "their estimates are not substantiated by any known facts from the fishery". Pitcher et al. countered by saying that instead of relying solely on public information supplied by the fishery, they had used "necessarily confidential sources (over 120 interviews) [which described] the procedures being used in laundering 27 IUU fish products".

== Publications ==
Pitcher has authored or co-authored 17 books or edited volumes, 250 peer-reviewed research papers and 251 other published contributions. As of 22 January 2021, Google Scholar reports his H-factor is 78 and he has 28,870 citations to his work.

Published books

- Staudigel, H., Koppers, A.A.P., Lavelle, J.W., Pitcher, T.J. and Shank, T. (eds) (2010) Mountains in the Sea. Special Issue, Oceanography 23(3): 213pp.
- Pitcher TJ, Morato T, Hart PJB, Clark MR, Haggan N and Santos RS (eds) (2007) Seamounts: Ecology, Fish and Aquatic Resources Series 12, Blackwell, Oxford, UK. ISBN 978-1-4051-3343-2
- Pitcher TJ and Hollingworth, C.E. (Eds) (2002) Recreational Fisheries: Ecological, Economic and Social Evaluation. Fish and Aquatic Resources Series No 8, Blackwell Science, Oxford, UK. ISBN
- Coward, H., Ommer, R. and Pitcher TJ (Eds) (2000) Just Fish: the Ethics of Canadian Fisheries. Institute of Social and Economic Research Press, St John's, Newfoundland. ISBN 0-919666-97-3.
- Pitcher TJ and Pauly D (eds) (1998) The Beverton and Holt Jubilee. Special Issue of Reviews in Fish Biology and Fisheries 7 (3). ISSN 0960-3166.
- Pitcher TJ, Pauly D and Hart PJB (eds) (1998) Reinventing Fisheries Management. Fish and Fisheries Series, Vol. 23, Kluwer Academic, Dordrecht. ISBN 0-412-83410-3
- Munro, G. M. and Pitcher TJ (1996) Individual Transferable Quotas. Special Issue of Reviews in Fish Biology and Fisheries 6 (1): 116pp. ISSN 0960-3166.
- Pitcher TJ and Hart PJB (eds) (1995) The Impact of Species Changes in the African Lakes. Fish and Fisheries Series vol. 18, Kluwer Academic, Dordrecht. ISBN 0-412-55050-4.
- Alheit J and Pitcher TJ (eds) (1995) Hake: Fisheries, Ecology and Markets, Fish and Fisheries Series vol. 15, Chapman and Hall, London.
- Carvalho GR and Pitcher TJ (eds) (1994) Molecular Genetics in Fisheries. Chapman and Hall, London. ISBN 0-412-62950-X.
- Pitcher TJ (ed.) (1993) The Behaviour of Teleost Fishes, 2nd edition. Fish and Fisheries Series Vol. 7, Chapman and Hall, London. ISBN 0-412-42930-6.
- Pitcher TJ and Hollingworth, C.E. (eds) (1990) Collected Reports on Fisheries Research in Malawi. Occasional Papers Volume 1: 72pp, Overseas Development Administration, London, UK. ISSN 0962-4619.
- Pitcher TJ, Magurran AE and Margetts AR (eds) (1986) The Behaviour of Fishes. Supplement to the Journal of Fish Biology 29(A): 232 pp.
- Pitcher TJ (ed) (1986) The Behaviour of Teleost Fishes. Croom Helm, London. ISBN 0-7099-2070-9
- Rankin JC, Pitcher TJ and Duggan RT (eds) (1983) Control Processes in Fish Physiology. Croom Helm, London, UK. ISBN 0-7099-2246-9
- Pitcher TJ and Hart PJB (1982) Fisheries Ecology. Chapman and Hall, London, UK. ISBN 0-7099-2057-1. Reprinted 15 times as a paperback from 1983 to 2001.
