= Nereus Program =

- Purpose: ocean sustainability, climate change, research,
- Location: University of British Columbia, Vancouver, British Columbia, Canada
- Region served: Worldwide
- Website: www.nereusprogram.org

The Nereus Program is a global interdisciplinary initiative between the Nippon Foundation and the University of British Columbia that was created to further our knowledge of how best to attain sustainability for our world's oceans. In addition to the Nippon Foundation and UBC, the program partners with University of Cambridge, Duke University, Princeton University, Stockholm University, United Nations Environment Program-World Conservation Monitoring Centre and Utrecht University. The program is built around three core objectives: to conduct collaborative ocean research across the natural and social sciences, to develop an interdisciplinary network of experts that can engage in discussion of complex and multifaceted questions of ocean sustainability, and to transfer these ideas to practical solutions in global policy forums.

== Program leadership ==
- Yoshitaka Ota is director (policy) of the NF-UBC Nereus Program. He is a research assistant professor for the School of Marine and Environmental Affairs at the University of Washington. His main research is anthropology of fishing, assessing current global outlook of indigenous fishing and coastal food security. He also works on ocean governance and policy, marine spatial planning and knowledge communication.
- William Cheung is director (science) of the NF-UBC Nereus Program and the principal investigator of the UBC Nereus Research group since 2014. He is also an associate professor at the University of British Columbia. His main research area is on assessing impacts of fishing and climate change on marine ecosystems and their goods and services, and studying ways to reconcile trade-offs in their management.
- Daniel Pauly is the chair of the Nereus steering committee and a member of the advisory board. He is professor at the University of British Columbia and the principal investigator of the Sea Around Us Program. His research focuses on the global impact of fishing on the world's oceans and has developed the concept of shifting baseline and fishing down marine food webs.

== Budget ==
US$15 million (1.5 million annually for 9 years from 2011 to 2019). The Nereus Program is solely funded by the Nippon Foundation, the largest non-governmental foundation in Asia.

== Public engagement and policy applications ==
The Nereus Program is engaged with policy processes both at international and regional levels. The program has organized side events and workshops together with international organization representatives and national governmental officers.

2017: Side event at the UN Oceans Conference titled "The Role of the Oceans in Sustainability: Benefits of Achieving SDG 14 for all Sustainable Development Goals", where discussions led by Nereus affiliates were focused on how research indicates that achieving SDG 14 ocean targets contributes to the achievement of other SDG targets in the context of our changing ocean due to climate change and social equity.

2016: Side event at the United Nations Fish Stock Agreement Review Conference titled "Science, Policy and Civil Society: The Role of NGOs in Global Fisheries Management", where ongoing Nereus research on the potential role of civil society within regional fisheries management organizations was presented.

2015: Press conference on the Nereus Program report in Tokyo (covered by 20 international media outlets, including CBS, and five major Japanese newspapers).

2013: Side event at the United Nations Open-ended Informal Consultative Process on Oceans and the Law of the Sea on seafood security and climate change (attended by nine countries representatives including Japan, US and Palau)

== Fellowships ==
The Nereus Program provides fellowships to young scholars who conduct their research at participating academic institutes. Since 2011, there have been 30 Nereus Fellows working in various issues on the future of oceans and fisheries. Currently, 11 postdoc and 7 Ph.D. students in the natural and social sciences are participating in the Nereus Program as Nereus Fellows.

Program Alumni have gone on to marine research positions in various institutes, including at the USA National Oceanic and Atmospheric Administration, University of South Carolina, International Atomic Energy Agency, and ETH Zurich.

== Reports ==
In May 2017, the Nereus Program released a research report, 'Oceans and Sustainable Development Goals: Co-Benefits, Climate Change and Social Equity', bringing attention to the co-benefits of achieving the ocean goal SDG 14 on other sustainable development goals. Within the report, Nereus affiliate members have highlighted the idea that climate issues and social equity issues are inter-related; thus, this report has deduced that improving the health of our oceans through SDG 14 targets will contribute to the improvement of other areas of society, including, but not limited to, gender equality, sustained economic development, education quality, terrestrial conservation, reduced poverty, and food security.

In June 2015, the Program released a research report entitled 'Predicting Future Oceans — Climate Change, Oceans & Fisheries', summarizing the main contributions of the numerous projects undertaken by the members of the Nereus Program and its associated colleagues in cross-disciplinary analyses of the global ocean systems. Specifically, this year's report discussed global changes that are impacting the marine ecosystems' seafood production capacity, emerging trends in ocean governance, and socioeconomic changes that are affecting our relationship with the sea.

== Publications ==
The program has produced over 150 peer-reviewed papers in various journals, including Science and Nature Climate Change.

Full list of publications

Select publications:

- Bennett, N. J., Teh, L., Ota, Y., Christie, P., Ayers, A., Day, J.C., Franks, P., Gill, D., Gruby, R. L., Kittinger, J. N., 2017, An appeal for a code of conduct for marine conservation. Marine Policy, 81: 411-418,
- Kittinger, J. N., Teh, L. C. L., Allison, E. H., Bennett, N. J., Crowder, L. B., Finkbeiner, E. M., Hicks. C., Scarton, C. G., Nakamura, K., Ota, Y., Young, J., Alifano, A., Apel, A., Arbib, A. Bishop, L., Boyle, M., Cisneros-Montemayor, A. M., Hunter, P., Cornu, E. L., Levine, M., Jones, R. S., Koehn, Z., Marschke, M., Mason, J. G., Micheli, F., McClenachan, L., Opal, C., Peacey, J., Peckham, S. H., Schemmel, E., Solis-Rivera, V., Swartz, W., Wilhelm, T. A., 2017. Committing to socially responsible seafood. Science, 356(6341): 912-913.
- Stock, C. A., John, J. G., Rykaczewski, R. R., Asch, R. G., Cheung, W. W. L., Dunne, J. P., Friedland, K. D., Lam, V. W. Y., Sarmiento, J. L., Watson, R. A., 2017. Reconciling fisheries catch and ocean productivity. PNAS, doi:10.1073
- Cheung W., Reygondeau G., Frölicher T., 2016. Large benefits to marine fisheries of meeting the 1.5°C global warming target. Science, 354(6319): 1591-1594.
- Cisneros-Montemayor A., Pauly D., Weatherdon L., Ota Y., 2016. A Global Estimate of Seafood Consumption by Coastal Indigenous Peoples. PLoS ONE, https://dx.doi.org/10.1371/journal.pone.0166681.
- Lam V., Cheung W., Reygondeau G., Sumaila U.R., 2016. Projected change in global fisheries revenues under climate change. Scientific Reports.
- Cheung W., Jones M., Lam V., Miller D., Ota Y., Teh L., Sumaila U., 2016. Transform high seas management to build climate resilience in marine seafood supply. Fish and Fisheries.
- Weatherdon L., Magnan A., Rogers A., Sumaila R., Cheung W., 2016. Observed and Projected Impacts of Climate Change on Marine Fisheries, Aquaculture, Coastal Tourism, and Human Health: An Update. Frontiers in Marine Science, 3.
- Friedland K., Record N., Asch R., Kristiansen T., Saba V., Drinkwater K., Henson S., Leaf R., Morse R., Johns D., Large S., Hjøllo, Nye J., Alexander M., Ji R., 2016. Seasonal phytoplankton blooms in the North Atlantic linked to the overwintering strategies of copepods. Elementa: Science of the Anthropocene, 4.
- Weatherdon L., Ota Y., Jones M., Close D., Cheung W., 2016. Projected Scenarios for Coastal First Nations' Fisheries Catch Potential under Climate Change: Management Challenges and Opportunities, PLoS ONE.
- Bailey M., Favaro B., Otto S., Charles A., Devillers R., Metaxas A., Tyedmers P., Ban N., Mason T., Hoover C., Duck T., Fanning L., Milley C., Cisneros-Montemayor A., Pauly D., Cheung W., Cullis-Suzuki S., Teh L., U. Sumaila R., 2016. Canada at a crossroad: The imperative for realigning ocean policy with ocean science, Marine Policy. 63 (53–60).
- Crona B., Daw T., Swartz W., Nyström M., Norström A., Thyresson M., Österblom H., Folke C., Sundberg J., 2015. Masked, diluted and drowned out: why signals from local marine ecosystems are not transmitted through global seafood markets. Fish and Fisheries.
- Lewison R., Hobday A. J., Maxwell S., Hazen E., Hartog J. R., Dunn D., Briscoe D., Fossette S., O'Keefe C. E., Barnes M., Abecassis M., Bograd S., Bethoney N. D., Bailey H., Wiley D., Andrews S., Hazen L., Crowder L. B., 2015, Dynamic ocean management: Identifying the critical ingredients of dynamic approaches to ocean resource management, BioScience, 65 (5), 486-498
- McOwen C.J., Cheung W.W.L., Rykaczewski R.R., Watson R.A., Wood J.L., 2014. Is fisheries production within Large Marine Ecosystems determined by bottom-up or top-down forcing? Fish and Fisheries, DOI 10.1111/faf.12082.
- Sydeman, W., García-Reyes, M., Schoeman, D., Rykaczewski, R., Thompson, S., Black, B., Bograd, S. 2014. Climate change and wind intensification in coastal upwelling ecosystems. Science, 345(6192): 77-80.
- Tittensor, D.P., Walpole, M., Hill, S.L.L., Boyce, D.G., Britten, G.L., Burgess, N.D., Butchart, S.H.M., Leadley, P.W., Regan, E.C., Alkemade, R., Baumung, R., Bellard, C., Bouwman, L., Bowles-Newark, N.J., Chenery, A.M., Cheung, W.W.L., Christensen, V., et al. 2014. A mid-term analysis of progress toward international biodiversity targets. Science 346(6206): 241-244.
- Cheung W.W.L., Watson R., Pauly D., 2013. Signature of Ocean Warming in Global Fisheries Catch. Nature, 497, 365-368.
- Hanich, Q., Ota, Y., 2013. Moving beyond rights-based management: a transparent approach to distributing the conservation burden and benefit in tuna fisheries. The International Journal of Marine and Coastal Law, 28(1): 135-170.
