= Volvo Environment Prize =

Swedish science award

- Description: Recognizing outstanding scientific achievements in sustainability
- Country: Sweden
- Presented by: Volvo Environment Prize Foundation
- Reward: SEK 1.5 million (approx. $140,000)
- Website: http://www.environment-prize.com/

The Volvo Environment Prize is a highly regarded annual scientific award. The prize is awarded to individuals who "explore the way to a sustainable world." The prize is awarded by the Volvo Environment Prize Foundation which was instituted in 1988.

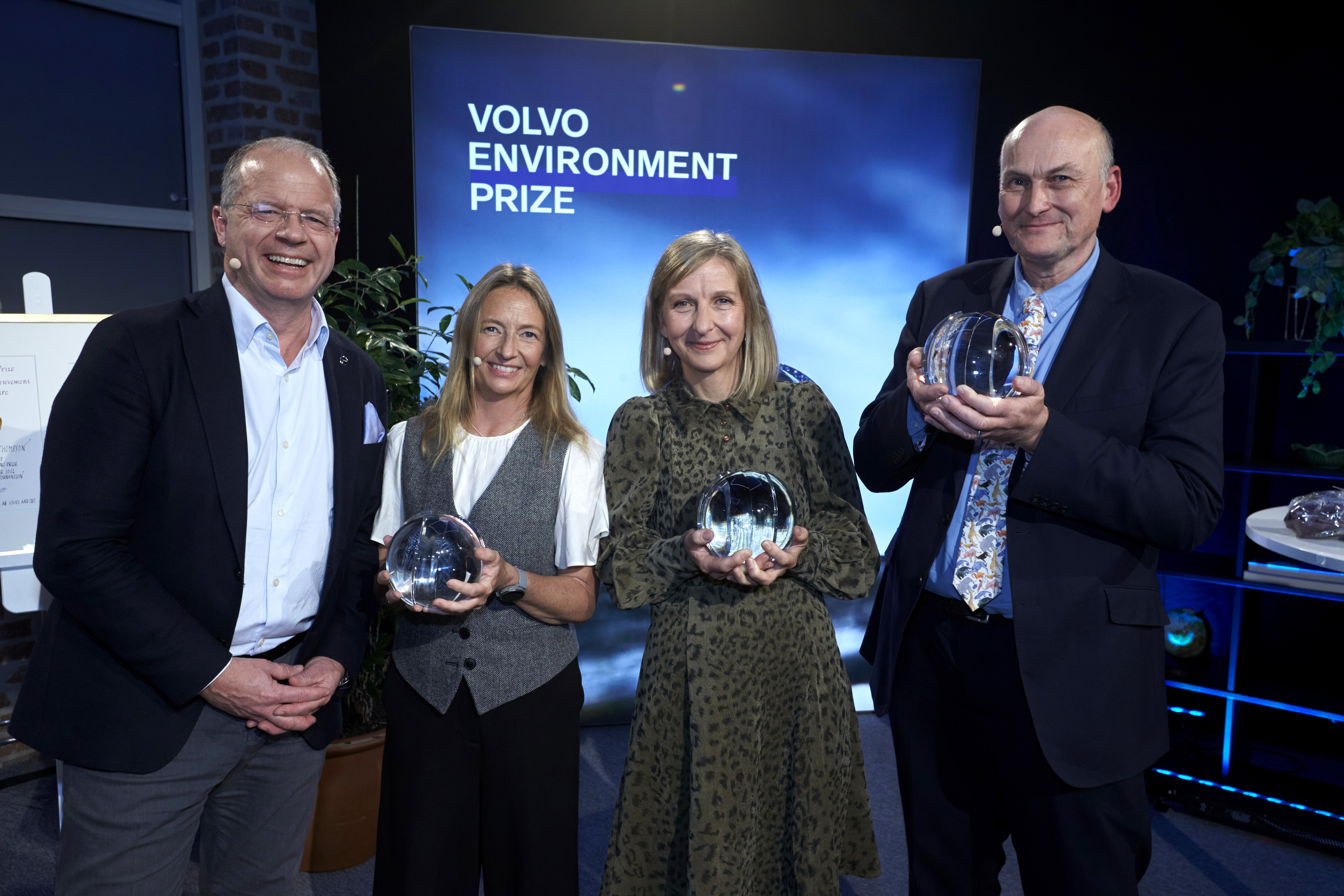
The Volvo Environment Prize 2022 laureates receive their award.

Scientific excellence is the most important criterion for becoming a laureate. The candidate must have an outstanding research and publication record in his or her field. Strong emphasis is also placed on the research's impact on the policy and application sectors.

The Volvo Environment Prize recipient receives a "hand-crafted diploma, a glass sculpture and a cash award of SEK 1.5 million (approximately Euro 135,000 or USD 140,000)".

== Organisation ==
A scientific committee headed by Professor Carl Folke does the initial screening and evaluation of candidates, which are presented to the International prize jury. The prize jury is chaired by Professor Mary Scholes (University of the Witwatersrand, South Africa) with members Professor Peijun Shi (Beijing Normal University, China), Professor Kazuhiko Takeuchi (University of Tokyo, Japan) Dr. Sybille van den Hove (Autonomous University of Barcelona, Spain) and Professor Johan Rockström, Potsdam Institute for Climate Impact Research.

== Laureates ==
Since the first award in 1990, the prize has gone to 52 individuals. Among them are many well-known researchers and three scientists who first received the Volvo Environment Prize and later the Nobel Prize. The laureates represent all fields of environmental and sustainability studies and initiatives.

- 2025 Professor Naomi Oreskes for "pioneering research on the history and philosophy of Earth and Environmental Sciences."
- 2024 Professor Frank Biermann for "defining new pathways for international environmental governance in a period of global change"
- 2023 Professor Eduardo Brondizio for "world leading research in complex systems thinking, which is embedded in an ethnographic approach"
- 2022 Professor Richard Thompson, Professor Tamara Galloway, Professor Penelope Lindeque for "ground breaking research that has been instrumental in providing societal awareness of plastic pollution as an emerging global challenge"
- 2021 Professor Paul Anastas for "pioneering work in ”green chemistry”, a systems approach to sustainability that tackles pollution problems at their source"
- 2020 Professor Claire Kremen for "research and action reconciling food production and biodiversity conservation"
- 2019 Professor Terry Chapin for being a "world-leading ecologist and profound thinker on stewardship of the Earth"
- 2018 Professor Xuemei Bai for being a "global thought leader in urban sustainability research"
- 2017 Professor Rashid Sumaila for being "one of the worlds’ most innovative researchers into the future of the oceans and marine life"
- 2016 Professor Carlos Nobre for "pioneering efforts in understanding the Amazon"
- 2015 Professor Henning Rodhe for "groundbreaking contributions to the understanding of the world’s atmosphere"
- 2014 Professor Eric Lambin for "advancing the global understanding of land use change and what it means for human wellbeing"
- 2013 Qin Dahe for "research on the cryosphere and impact on the global climate"
- 2012 Professor Gretchen Daily for "valuation of natural capital and ecosystem services"
- 2011 Professor Hans Joachim Schellnhuber for "leadership at the global level in the intellectual and conceptual development of Earth System science"
- 2010 Harold A. Mooney for having "championed the idea that biodiversity is a key piece in ecosystem functioning"
- 2009 Dr. Susan Solomon for having "played a key role in producing the report that has helped the world understand the severity of global warming"
- 2008 Professor C. S. Holling for "his pioneering lifetime work on ecosystem dynamics, transformation and resilience"
- 2007 Amory Lovins for "his outstanding achievements in the field of energy efficiency"
- 2006 Professor Ray Hilborn, Professor Daniel Pauly and Professor Carl Walters for their work on "human impacts on global ocean environments"
- 2005 Dr. Mary T. Kalin Arroyo and Professor Aila Inkeri Keto for their work on "understanding of the importance of conservation"
- 2004 Dr. David Satterthwaite, Jamie Lerner, Dr. Luisa Molina and Dr. Mario Molina for their "outstanding work on three linked urbanization themes"
- 2003 Professor Madhav Gadgil and Professor Muhammad Yunus for being "true and worthy scientists of the poor"
- 2002 Partha Dasgupta and Karl-Göran Mäler for their work on "property rights, poverty, and economic development"
- 2001 Dr. George M. Woodwell for his work on "ecosystem research and public policy development"
- 2000 Professor José Goldemberg, Dr. Thomas B. Johansson, Professor Amulya Kumar N. Reddy and Dr. Robert H. Williams for their work on "environmentally sound solutions to global energy needs"
- 1999 Dr. M. S. Swaminathan for his work on "agriculture and resource conservation to eradicate poverty"
- 1998 Professor David Schindler and Professor Malin Falkenmark for their work on "availability and quality of freshwater"
- 1997 Dr. Syukuro Manabe and Dr. Veerabhadran Ramanathan for their work on "climate modelling and climate change"
- 1996 Dr. James Lovelock for his work on "new sensitive measurement techniques"
- 1995 Professor Gilbert F. White for his work on natural resource planning
- 1994 Professor Gita Sen for her work on "poverty and environment‚ the role of women"
- 1993 Professor Paul R. Ehrlich and Professor John P. Holdren for their work on "understanding of population and resources"
- 1992 Dr. Norman Myers and Professor Peter H. Raven for working on "biodiversity, particularly in tropical regions"
- 1991 Professor Paul Crutzen for his research projects in atmospheric chemistry
- 1990 Professor John V. Krutilla and Professor Allen V. Kneese for their work on "environmental and resource economics"

== See also ==
- List of environmental awards
