= Ecopath =

Ecosystem modelling software

Ecopath with Ecosim
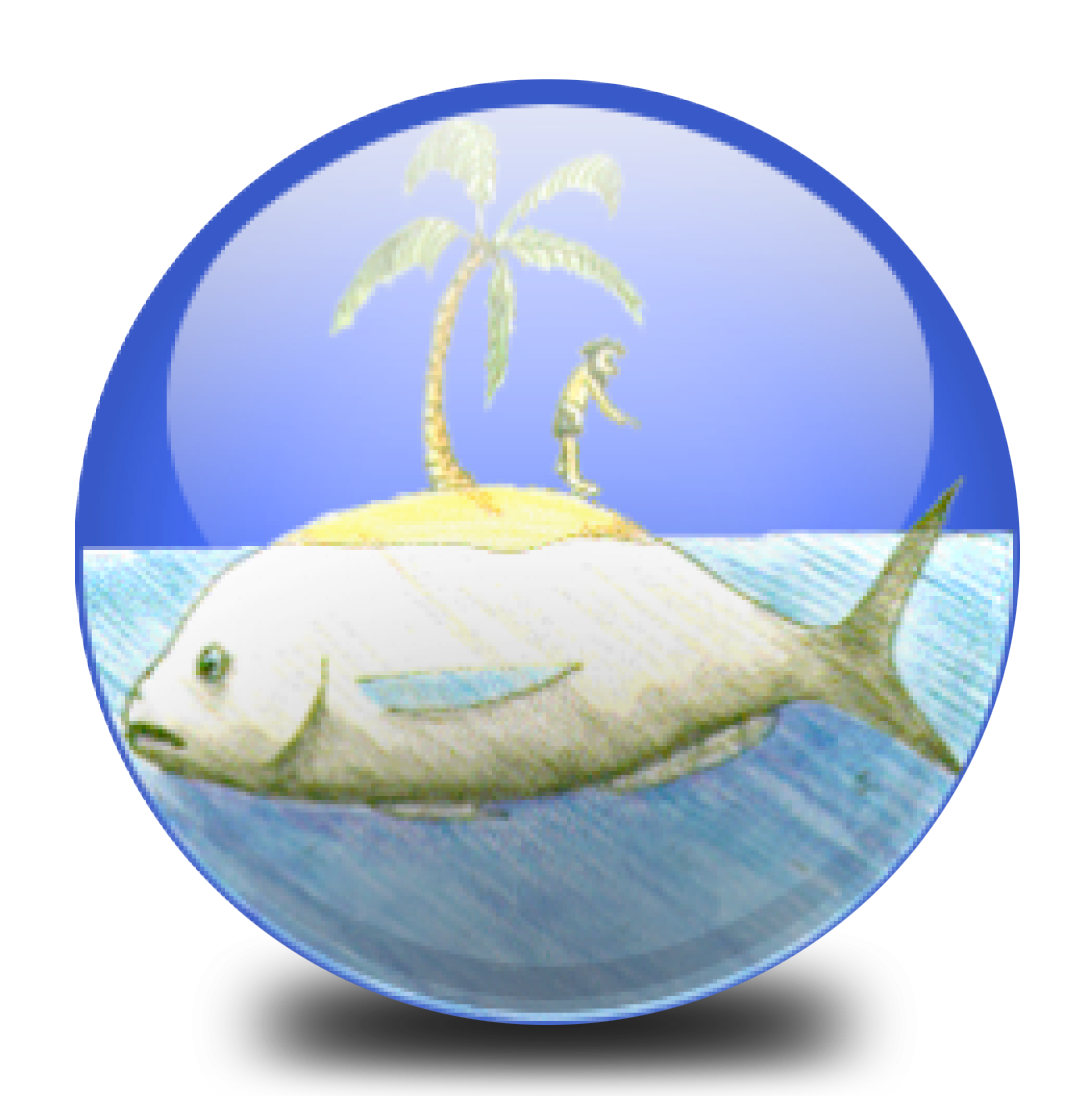
- Developers: Ecopath Research and Development Consortium
- Initial release: 1992
- Stable release: 6.6.8 / 4 November 2022
- Preview release: 6.7 alpha (on request) / 4 November 2022
- Repository: https://sources.ecopath.org/trac/Ecopath
- Written in: Visual Basic.NET, C#
- Operating system: Windows Vista (non-supported), 7, 8*, 10, 11 (EwE desktop version), Unix and Linux (EwE core via Mono)
- Platform: .NET Framework 4.8
- Available in: English
- Type: Ecosystem model
- License: GPL v2
- Website: https://www.ecopath.org

Ecopath with Ecosim (EwE) is a free and open source ecosystem modelling software suite, initially started at NOAA by Jeffrey Polovina, but has since primarily been developed at the formerly UBC Fisheries Centre of the University of British Columbia. In 2007, it was named as one of the ten biggest scientific breakthroughs in NOAA's 200-year history. The NOAA citation states that Ecopath "revolutionized scientists' ability worldwide to understand complex marine ecosystems". Behind this lie more than three decades of development work in association with a thriving network of fisheries scientists such as Villy Christensen, Carl Walters and Daniel Pauly, and software engineers around the world. EwE is funded through projects, user contributions, user support, training courses and co-development collaborations. Per November 2021 there are an estimated 8000+ users across academia, non-government organizations, industry and governments in 150+ countries.

== Components ==
EwE has three main components:

- Ecopath – a static, mass-balanced snapshot of the system
- Ecosim – a time dynamic simulation module for policy exploration
- Ecospace – a spatial and temporal dynamic module designed for exploring the combined impacts of fishing, the placement of protected areas, and changing environmental conditions.

== Capabilities ==
The Ecopath software package can be used to:

- address ecological questions
- evaluate ecosystem effects of fishing
- explore management policy options
- analyze impact and placement of marine protected areas
- predict movement and accumulation of contaminants and tracers (Ecotracer)
- model effect of environmental changes,
- facilitate end-to-end ecosystem model construction

Development Ecopath version 6.0 received support from the Lenfest Ocean Program and the Pew Charitable trusts. In 2011 the Ecopath Research and Development Consortium was founded to share the responsibility of maintaining and further developing the approach with institutions around the world. EwE exclusively relies on user involvement for continued software development and releases of new versions.

The desktop version of Ecopath with Ecosim runs only on Windows and requires Microsoft Access database drivers version 2007 or newer. The computational core of Ecopath with Ecosim can be executed on other operating systems such as Unix or Linux using the Mono common language runtime. Spin-off versions in R, Matlab and Fortran are developed independently of the main desktop version of EwE, and are not supported by the Ecopath Research and Development Consortium.

== Funding ==
In 2013, development efforts were centralized under Ecopath International Initiative, Spain, which coincided with a switch to a community-driven development model overseen by the Ecopath Research and Development Consortium. As the approach does not receive any core funding, the Ecopath with Ecosim approach now relies entirely on user-contributed project funding for continued development and releases.
