= Michael Fasham =

British oceanographer and ecosystem modeller

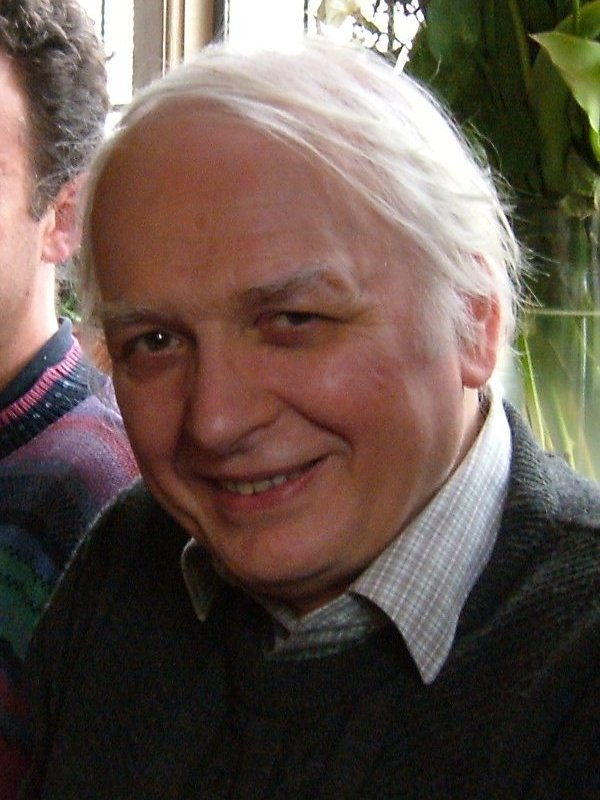
- Fasham pictured in 2004
- Born: Michael John Robert Fasham; 29 May 1942; Edgware, United Kingdom
- Died: 7 June 2008 (aged 66)
- Education: Kilburn Grammar School; University of Birmingham
- Awards: FRS (2000); Challenger Society Medal (2002); ASLO John Martin Award (2010)
- Scientific career
- Fields: Oceanography; Ecosystem modelling
- Workplaces: National Institute of Oceanography (NIO); National Oceanography Centre, Southampton (NOCS)
- Thesis: A statistical analysis of oceanic magnetic anomalies (1968)

Michael John Robert Fasham, FRS (29 May 1942 – 7 June 2008) was a British oceanographer and ecosystem modeller. He is best known for his pioneering work in the development of open ocean plankton ecosystem models.

== Early life and education ==
Fasham was born in 1942 in Edgware in north London, and attended Kilburn Grammar School in Queen's Park. At the University of Birmingham he initially studied physics, obtaining his first degree in 1963, but moved to marine geology for his PhD, which was awarded in 1968.

== Career ==
After his PhD, he joined the National Institute of Oceanography (NIO) in Wormley, and remained with this organisation and its successor institutes throughout his career. Here, together with NIO colleagues, Fasham developed one of the first shipborne computer systems. He also applied his experience in statistics to the biogeography of plankton, a field that was then largely descriptive. This led to a series of papers on plankton distribution, as well as the development of an underway fluorimeter that could be used to measure phytoplankton chlorophyll on hydrographic surveys.

A diagram of the Fasham, Ducklow & McKelvie (1990) open ocean plankton ecosystem model

During the 1980s, Fasham began to direct his research toward quantitative treatments of the flows of energy and material through ocean food webs. This work led to the development by Fasham and colleagues of a seminal open ocean plankton ecosystem model. This model, sometimes known by the initials of its authors, "FDM", divides the plankton ecosystem into seven components including phytoplankton and zooplankton, and includes a microbial loop to represent remineralisation. The study is one of the most highly cited papers in the field, and won the American Society of Limnology and Oceanography John Martin Award in recognition of this in 2010. Subsequent joint work with colleagues in Princeton University led to the ecosystem model being one of the first to be applied within a general circulation model of the North Atlantic. In later work, Fasham continued to advance ecosystem models by considering aspects such as parameter optimisation, the balance of autotrophic and heterotrophic plankton, diel vertical migration, and the role of the micronutrient iron in oceanic primary production.

Fasham also played an important role in the international Joint Global Ocean Flux Study (JGOFS) that ran from 1987 to 2003, and he served on both the National and International Committees before ultimately taking the role as chair of the International Committee from 1998 to 2000.

== Awards and honours ==
Fasham was elected a Fellow of the Royal Society (FRS) in 2000, and in 2002 he received the Challenger Society Medal in recognition of his role in marine science.

== Personal life ==
Though he officially retired in 2002, Fasham continued his research and teaching, but died in 2008 after a long battle with cancer.
