= Marie Auger-Méthé =

Canadian statistical ecologist

Marie Auger-Méthé is a Canadian environmental statistician and ecologist who holds a Canada Research Chair in Statistical Ecology as an associate professor at the University of British Columbia, in its Department of Statistics and Institute for the UBC Institute for the Oceans and Fisheries.

== Research ==
Auger-Méthé's research concerns the movement patterns of marine and polar animals. Her doctoral research involved polar bears, supervised at the University of Alberta by Andrew Derocher and Mark A. Lewis. Other subjects of her research have included narwhals, orca, fin whales, gentoo penguins, and arctic terns.

== Education and career ==
Auger-Méthé has bachelor's and master's degrees from Dalhousie University, and completed her Ph.D. at the University of Alberta. She returned to Dalhousie as a postdoctoral researcher before taking her present position at the University of British Columbia.

She was given her Canada Research Chair in 2018; it was renewed in 2023.

== Recognition ==
Auger-Méthé was elected to the College of New Scholars, Artists and Scientists of the Royal Society of Canada in 2024.

Her work with students and colleagues at UBC on hidden Markov models won the 2023 Canadian Journal of Statistics Award.
