= T. V. Ramakrishnan =

Indian theoretical physicist (born 1941)

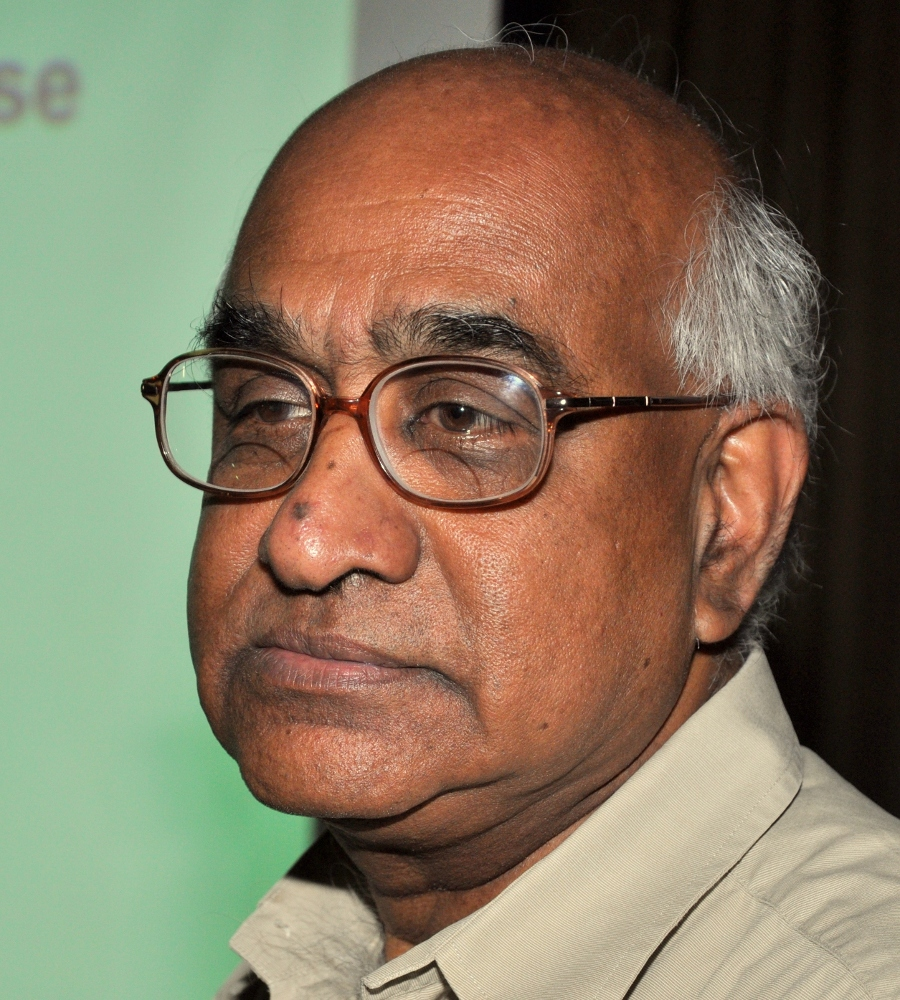
- T. V. Ramakrishnan
- Born: Tiruppattur Venkatachalamurti Ramakrishnan; 14 August 1941 (age 85); Madras, Tamil Nadu, India
- Education: Banaras Hindu University (B.Sc.) (M.Sc.); Columbia University (Ph.D.)
- Known for: Contributions to Theoretical Condensed Matter Physics and Statistical Mechanics
- Awards: Trieste Science Prize (2005); Padma Shri (2001); FRS (2000); Shanti Swarup Bhatnagar Award (1983)
- Scientific career
- Fields: Theoretical Physics; Condensed Matter Physics
- Workplaces: Banaras Hindu University; Indian Institute of Science; Princeton University
- Doctoral advisor: Joaquin Mazdak Luttinger

Tiruppattur Venkatachalamurti Ramakrishnan FRS (born 14 August 1941) is an Indian theoretical physicist renowned for his contributions to condensed matter physics. He served as the DAE Homi Bhabha Chair Professor in the Department of Physics at Banaras Hindu University (BHU) from 2003 to 2008 and has been an Emeritus Professor there since 2006. He is also a Distinguished Associate at the Centre for Condensed Matter Theory, Department of Physics, Indian Institute of Science, Bangalore.

== Biography ==
Tiruppattur Venkatachalamurti Ramakrishnan was born on 14 August 1941 in Madras, Tamil Nadu. He completed his B.Sc (Hons.) and M.Sc in Physics from Banaras Hindu University in 1959 and 1961. He then worked as a CSIR research fellow at Banaras Hindu University from 1961 to 1962. He later completed his Ph.D. from Columbia University in 1966. He started his professional career as lecturer in the Indian Institute of Technology, Kanpur. He shifted to the Indian Institute of Science, Bangalore in 1986 where he continued till 2003. He also served on the Physical Sciences jury for the Infosys Prize from 2010 to 2013.

Ramakrishnan has made seminal contributions to the scaling theory of electron localization. He has made contributions to the theory of liquid to solid transition and of mixed valence systems.

== Awards and honours ==
He was awarded the Shanti Swarup Bhatnagar Award in 1983, TWAS Prize in 1990 and the Padma Shri in 2001. In 1987 he was elected a Fellow of the American Physical Society "for his contributions to the many-body theory of disordered systems, especially the scaling theory of localization and the theory of mixed-valent impurities"

Ramakrishnan was elected a Fellow of the Royal Society (FRS) in 2000. His certificate of election reads:

Professor Ramakrishnan has made crucial contributions to our understanding of condensed many body systems. His pioneering work started two major areas of activity. These are: the liquid-solid transition as well as related phenomena in dense classical systems, and the onset of electron localization in disordered systems. He has also made many significant contributions to their growth. In a third area, namely mixed valence in rare-earth metals, his work on the inverse orbital degeneracy expansion has had a major effect on the field
