= Mark A. Lewis =

Canadian mathematician

Mark Lewis
- Born: December 7, 1962 (age 63)
- Citizenship: Canadian
- Education: University of Oxford; University of Victoria
- Scientific career
- Fields: Mathematical biology
- Workplaces: University of Victoria; University of Alberta; University of Utah
- Thesis: Analysis of dynamic and stationary biological pattern formation (1990)
- Doctoral advisor: James D. Murray
- Other academic advisors: Peter Kareiva
- Doctoral students: Marie Auger-Méthé
- Website: http://www.math.ualberta.ca/~mlewis/index.html

Mark Alun Lewis FRSC (born 7 December 1962) is the Gilbert and Betty Kennedy Chair in Mathematical Biology at the University of Victoria, professor emeritus and former Canada Research Chair of mathematical biology in the Department of Mathematical and Statistical Sciences and Department of Biological Sciences at the University of Alberta. Among other topics, he has written extensively on the Allee effect, invasive species, parasitism, and biological dispersal.

Mark Lewis completed a B.Sc. with a double major in biology and a combined major in mathematics and computer science at the University of Victoria in 1987, where he worked with Pauline van den Driessche. He earned his Ph.D. in mathematical biology from Oxford University in 1990. After obtaining his Ph.D., he spent a year at the University of Washington as an NSERC postdoctoral research associate, and then became an assistant professor at the University of Utah in 1992.

In 2015, he was elected as a fellow of the Royal Society of Canada. He was elected as a fellow of the Society for Industrial and Applied Mathematics in 2017, "for contributions to mathematical biology and the study of spatial dynamics processes". In 2018 the Canadian Mathematical Society listed him in their inaugural class of fellows. He was elected a Fellow of the Royal Society in 2025.
