= List of fellows of the Royal Society elected in 2000 =

This is a list of fellows of the Royal Society elected in 2000.

== Fellows ==
- Michael Edwin Akam (born 1952), zoologist
- James Jeffrey Binney (born 1950), astrophysicist
- Brice Bosnich (1936–2015), Australian inorganic chemist
- Cyrus Chothia (1942–2019), molecular biologist
- Peter Cresswell, immunologist
- Alan Davison (1936–2015), inorganic chemist
- John Douglas Denton, physicist
- Warren John Ewens (born 1937) Australian mathematician
- Michael John Robert Fasham (1942–2008), oceanographer
- Michael Anthony John Ferguson (born 1957), biochemist
- Christopher Donald Frith (born 1942), psychologist
- Michel Goedert, neuroscientist
- Donald Grierson (born 1945), geneticist
- Peter Gavin Hall (born 1951), Australian mathematician
- Alexander Norman Halliday (born 1952), geochemist
- Andrew Bruce Holmes (born 1943), Australian and British chemist
- Roy Jackson, fluid dynamicist
- Bruce Arthur Joyce, materials physicist
- Simon Barry Laughlin, neurobiologist
- Peter Francis Leadlay
- Anthony Charles Legon, physical chemist
- Robert Glanville Lloyd
- Robert Sinclair MacKay (born 1956), mathematician
- Sir John Maddox (1925–2009) science writer, former editor of Nature (Honorary)
- Thomas John Martin
- Kiyoshi Nagai (1949–2019), structural biologist
- Stuart Stephen Papworth Parkin (born 1955), physicist
- Ole Holger Petersen (born 1943), physiologist
- Madabusi Santanam Raghunathan (born 1941), Indian mathematician
- Tiruppattur Venkatachalamurti Ramakrishnan (born 1941), Indian physicist
- Michael Alfred Robb
- Janet Rossant (born 1950), developmental biologist
- Patricia Ann Simpson, biologist
- Harry Smith (1935–2015), botanist
- Peter Somogyi (born 1950), neurobiologist
- Sir Martin Nicholas Sweeting (born 1951), aerospace engineer
- Brian Douglas Sykes, Biochemist, University of Alberta
- James Edgar Till (born 1931), Canadian biophysicist
- Paul Kingsley Townsend, physicist
- Alan Andrew Watson (born 1938) Scottish physicist
- Ian Andrew Wilson, biologist
- John Henry Woodhouse
- Adrian Frederick George Wyatt, physicist

== Foreign members ==
- Grigory Isaakovich Barenblatt (1927–2018), Russian mathematician
- Ronald Breslow (1931–2017), American chemist
- Harry Barkus Gray (born 1935) American Professor of Chemistry
- Erwin L Hahn (1921–2016), American physicist
- Martin Karplus (born 1930), Austrian-born American theoretical chemist
- Mitsuhiro Yanagida (born 1941), Japanese biologist
