= Claire Kremen =

American conservation biologist

- Education: BS, biology, 1982, Stanford University; PhD, 1987, Duke University
- Awards: MacArthur Fellows Program Volvo Environment Prize
- Scientific career
- Fields: biologist
- Workplaces: University of British Columbia; University of California, Berkeley; Princeton University
- Thesis: Metamorphosis of the butterfly, Precis coenia, (Nymphalidae): commitment of the imaginal disks and epidermis to pupal development (1987)

Claire Kremen is an American conservation biologist. She is a professor of conservation biology at the University of British Columbia, having formerly worked at the University of California, Berkeley, where she remains professor emerita.

== Early life and education ==
Kremen graduated from Stanford University with a B.S. in Biology in 1982, and from Duke University with a PhD in Zoology in 1987.

== Career ==
Upon completing her PhD, Kremen spent 10 years working for nonprofit organizations in conservation biology. She studied the impacts of Deforestation in Madagascar, on species distributions with a Web-based biodiversity database. Kremen eventually returned to North American and accepted a faculty position at Princeton University for four years before becoming a professor of environmental science, policy and management at University of California, Berkeley (UC Berkeley).

During her early tenure at UC Berkeley, Kremen also served as a member on the Committee on Status of Pollinators where she led the first global study on crop production that is reliant upon animal pollination. In recognition of her research, she was named a 2007 MacArthur Fellows Program, which came with an unrestricted $500,000 award for the next five years. In the same year, Kremen was also awarded a Hellman Fellowship from the American Academy of Arts & Sciences for her project "How does Biological Diversity Promote Ecosystem Services: a Mechanistic Study of Almond Crop Pollination in a Changing California Landscape." As an associate professor of environmental science, policy and management, Kremen led a study in 2011 which concluded that farmers could become more cost-efficient if they relied less on renting honey bees. In recognition of her academic achievements, Kremen was elected a Fellow of the California Academy of Sciences in 2013 and appointed Editor in Chief of the journal Frontiers in Sustainable Food Systems.

In 2019, Kremen left UC Berkeley to become one of the first University of British Columbia (UBC) President’s Excellence Chair in Biodiversity Studies at the UBC Institute for Resources, Environment and Sustainability. While serving in this role, she was awarded an honorary degree from the American Museum of Natural History in "recognition of her extraordinary contributions to science, education and society." In 2020, Kremen was the recipient of the Volvo Environment Prize for "exploring the way to a sustainable world."
