= Tamara Galloway =

British marine scientist

Tamara Susan Galloway OBE
- Education: University of Glasgow (BS); University of Edinburgh (PhD)
- Known for: Microplastics
- Awards: Order of the British Empire (2019); Volvo Environment Prize (2022)
- Scientific career
- Workplaces: University of Exeter; University of Plymouth

Tamara Susan Galloway OBE is a British marine scientist and Professor of Ecotoxicology at the University of Exeter. She was appointed an Officer of the Order of the British Empire in the 2019 Birthday Honours.

== Early life and education ==
Galloway studied biochemistry at the University of Glasgow. She graduated with first-class honours in 1983, and was awarded the Norman Davidson Memorial medal. Galloway moved to the University of Edinburgh for her graduate studies, and earned her PhD in 1986. She took an extensive career break between 1990 and 1997 during which she carried out a number of part-time positions, including as a research assistant to the Nobel Laureate Peter D. Mitchell at the Glynn Research Institute, at Glynn House, in Cornwall.

== Research and career ==
Galloway's research considers the biological impact of environmental change on human populations. Since 2003, Galloway has worked with Richard Thompson at the University of Plymouth on the impact of plastics in the environment. Together they worked to quantify the contamination of microplastics.

She became interested in the impacts of plastics on health and moved to the University of Exeter in 2007. Here she worked with the University of Exeter Medical School on Bisphenol A, which is a compound that is found in food and drink packaging. She used the National Health and Nutrition Examination Survey (NHANES), which was the first to collect information on urinary BPA concentrations. Galloway identified that Bisphenol A, which is detectable in 90% of adults, can cause increased risk of heart disease, diabetes and liver disease. She continued to investigate Bisphenol A, demonstrating that urinary concentrations are independently associated with cardiovascular disease. She conducted a study with the British Heart Foundation that involved over 1,600 patients, which confirmed that Bisphenol A accelerates the progression of heart disease by ten years. Galloway's work on Bisphenol A was covered in The Naked Scientists, Chemistry World and in USA Today.

Galloway is an expert in microplastics. Galloway predicted that microplastics would have an impact on the marine food chain. She has primarily looked at the impact of micro- and nano-plastics, finding that they can stop animals from feeding on their natural prey. Galloway demonstrated that this likely impacts the rest of the food chain, estimating that shellfish consumed by humans contained around 50 particles of plastic. She found that one shower could result in 100,000 microbeads ending up in the ocean. The work was used for the basis of the United Kingdom law that bans microbeads, which protects the environment from several thousand tonnes of microbeads every year. So far, she has found microplastics in every seawater sample that she has analysed.

Galloway provided evidence to a cross-party committee on the environment. Her research was used in the Government of the United Kingdom report A Green Future: Our 25 Year Plan to Improve the Environment. Galloway worked with Zero Plastic Waste and Policy Connect to investigate how it would be possible to eliminate plastic waste from the United Kingdom. She is a member of the Science Advice for Policy by European Academies group on microplastics in nature. Galloway served on the advisory board of Blue Planet II.

She is on the editorial board of Chemosphere.

=== Awards and honours ===
- 2018 The Guardian University Awards
- 2018 Natural Environment Research Council Impact Award
- 2019 Order of the British Empire
- Volvo Environment Prize (2022)
- Blue Planet Prize (2023)

=== Selected publications ===
- Galloway, Tamara (2008). "Association of Urinary Bisphenol A Concentration With Medical Disorders and Laboratory Abnormalities in Adults". JAMA. 300 (11): 1303–10. doi:10.1001/jama.300.11.1303. hdl:10871/37692. PMID 18799442.
- Galloway, Tamara (2011). "Microplastics as contaminants in the marine environment: A review" (PDF). Marine Pollution Bulletin. 62 (12): 2588–2597. doi:10.1016/j.marpolbul.2011.09.025. hdl:10871/19649. PMID 22001295.
- Galloway, Tamara (2011). "Accumulation of Microplastic on Shorelines Worldwide: Sources and Sinks". Environmental Science & Technology. 45 (21): 9175–9179. Bibcode:2011EnST...45.9175B. doi:10.1021/es201811s. PMID 21894925.
