= William Cheung (scientist) =

Marine biologist

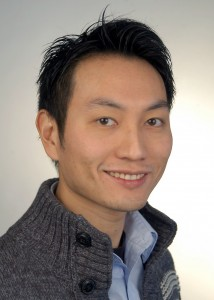
- Education: University of Hong Kong
- Awards: Prix d'Excellence, International Council for the Exploration of the Sea (2017)
- Scientific career
- Fields: Marine biologist, fisheries scientist
- Workplaces: UBC Fisheries Centre; Nereus Program; University of British Columbia; Changing Ocean Research Unit

William Cheung is a marine biologist, well known for his research on the impacts of climate change on marine ecosystems and fisheries. He currently works as director of science of the Nereus Program and is also an associate professor at the University of British Columbia, as well as Leader at the UBC Changing Ocean Research Unit.

He has published over 150 peer-reviewed publications, including papers in leading international journals.

== Background ==
Cheung obtained his Bachelor of Sciences in Biology and his master's from the University of Hong Kong. After working at WWF Hong Kong for two years, he finished a PhD in Resource Management and Environmental Studies at UBC. From 2009 to 2011, he worked as a lecturer in Marine Ecosystem Services at the School of Environmental Sciences, University of East Anglia.

== Notable research and projects ==
In 2015, as part of his role as director of science of the Nereus Program, Cheung led an international team of researchers studying the impact of two potential climate change outcomes (global temperature increases of two and five degrees Celsius) on fish migration and its associated ecological consequences. The research was intended to inform discussions on the topic at the 2015 United Nations Climate Change Conference in Paris.

Cheung was quoted in Yahoo! News regarding the report presented at the United Nations, stating that "The types of fish that we will have on our dinner table will be very different decades later compared to now." CBS News also reported on the study, adding that Cheung and his colleagues mentioned the world "needed to more aggressively combat rising emissions and improve ocean governance globally to ensure the fish we love to eat are not lost."

Another study Cheung partook in together with Nereus Program researchers, conducted in 2015, examined the divergence between federal ocean policy and marine science. Cheung was quoted by Canadian advocacy media outlet Voices-Voix as stating that "Effective ocean policy that is informed by science is extremely important for sustainable management of living marine resources particularly under climate change," and that "this study finds that this is not being promoted in Canada in many fronts: from conservation of endangered marine species to protection of fish habitats."

In 2015, Cheung published the article "Boom or Bust: The Future of Fish in the South China Sea" for the OceanAsia Project in collaboration with Rashid Sumaila, Research Director of the OceanCanada Partnership. The article, which analyzed the potential environmental, economic, and social consequences of threats to fish resources in the South China Sea, was the basis for a report on the state of fisheries consumption and impact in the region by the BBC.

In January 2016, Cheung co-authored a report warning about the future impact of uncontrolled climate change on fisheries in the Pacific Northwest, and its effect on the First Nations communities which depend on them. Cheung was quoted in the Washington Post as saying "With unmitigated climate change, current fish habitats are expected to become less suitable for many species that are culturally important for British Columbia's coastal communities."

Cheung is also involved in initiatives that bridge science and policy, including being a Lead Author in the Working Group II of the Fifth Assessment Report of the Intergovernmental Panel on Climate Change (IPCC), a Coordinating Lead Author of Intergovernmental Platform on Biodiversity and Ecosystem Services (IPBES), and a Lead Author of the Global Biodiversity Outlook (GBO).

== Selected publications ==
- Whitney, C. K., Bennett, N. J., Ban, N. C., Allison, E. H., Armitage, D., Blythe, J. L., Burt, J. M., Cheung, W., Finkbeiner, E. M., Kaplan-Hallam, M., Perry, I., Turner, N. J., Yumagulova, L., 2017. Adaptive capacity: from assessment to action in coastal social-ecological systems, Ecology and Society, 22(2), 22.
- Ahmed, N., Cheung, W., Thompson, S. Glaser, M., 2017. Solutions to blue carbon emissions: Shrimp cultivation, mangrove deforestation and climate change in coastal Bangladesh, Marine Policy, 82: 68-75,
- Cheung, W. W. L., Reygondeau, G., Frolicher, T. L., 2016. Large benefits to marine fisheries of meeting the 1.5°C global warming target, Science, 354(6319): 1591-1594
- Peterson G., Kabubo-Mariara J., Crossman N., Rashleigh B., Munoz P., Anticamara J., Mdemu M. V., Ainars A., Cheung W., Vogl A., 2016. Modelling consequences of change in biodiversity and ecosystems for nature’s benefits to people, Methodological assessment of scenarios and models of biodiversity and ecosystem services, 199-243.
- Cheung W., Jones M., Lam V., Miller D., Ota Y., Teh L., Sumaila U., 2016. Transform high seas management to build climate resilience in marine seafood supply, Fish and Fisheries, 10.1111/faf.12177.
- Weatherdon L., Ota Y., Jones M., Close D., Cheung W., 2016. Projected Scenarios for Coastal First Nations’ Fisheries Catch Potential under Climate Change: Management Challenges and Opportunities, PLoS ONE, https://doi.org/10.1371/journal.pone.0145285.
- Payne M., Barange M., Cheung W., MacKenzie B., Batchelder H., Cormon X., Eddy T., Fernandes J., Hollowed A., Jones M., Link J., Neubauer P., Ortiz I., Queirós A., Paula J., 2015. Uncertainties in projecting climate change impacts in marine ecosystems, ICES Journal of Marine Science, 73 (5): 1272-1282.
- Cheung W. W. L., Sumaila U. R., 2015, Economic incentives and overfishing: A bioeconomic vulnerability index. Marine Ecology Progress Series, 530: 223–232,
- Cheung W., Watson R., Pauly D. 2013. Signature of ocean warming in global fisheries catch. Nature. Vol. 497 (7449).
- Cheung W., Sarmiento J., Dunne J., Frölicher T., Lam V., Palomares M. L., Watson R., Pauly D. 2012. Shrinking of fishes exacerbates impacts of global ocean changes on marine ecosystems. Nature Climate Change. Vol. 3(3).
- Cheung W., Lam V., Sarmiento J., Kearney K., Watson R., Zeller D., Pauly D. 2010. Large-scale redistribution of maximum fisheries catch potential in the global ocean under climate change. Global Change Biology. Vol. 16(1).
- Cheung W., Lam V., Sarmiento J., Kearney K., Watson R., Pauly D. 2009. Projecting global marine biodiversity impacts under climate change scenarios. Fish and Fisheries. Vol. 10 (3): Oxford.
- Cheung W., Pitcher T., Pauly D.. 2005. A fuzzy logic expert system to estimate intrinsic extinction vulnerabilities of marine fishes to fishing. Biological Conservation. Vol. 124(1).
