= Xuemei Bai =

Climate scientist

- Education: Peking University; University of Tokyo
- Scientific career
- Workplaces: CSIRO; Australian National University

Xuemei Bai (白雪梅) is a Distinguished Professor of Urban Environment and Human Ecology at the Australian National University. She was the winner of the 2018 Volvo Environmental Prize, and is the winner of the KIEL Global Economy Prize 2021. She is an elected fellow of the Academy of the Social Sciences in Australia and an ARC Laureate Fellow (2023-). Bai is a commissioner of the Earth Commission, leading a group on methods of cross-scale translation from planetary limits to local actors. She has been named as one of the World’s 100 Most Influential People in Climate Change Policy in 2019 and 2021.

== Education and career ==
Bai was born and raised in China. She resided in Japan for many years, and is now a citizen in Australia. She earned her bachelor's degree from Peking University (1988), her master's in engineering from The University of Tokyo (1990), and her Ph.D. from The University of Tokyo (1993).

From 1993 until 1998, Bai was a researcher at the Japanese Center for International Studies in Ecology, and then she worked at the Institute for Global Environmental Strategies, Japan until 2006. From 2001 until 2003, she was a visiting professor at the Yale School of Forestry and Environmental Studies.

In 2006, she joined CSIRO in Australia, and in 2011 she became a distinguished professor in the Fenner School of Environment and Society at Australian National University.

== Research ==
Bai is known for her work in urban sustainability science and policy, including drivers and consequence of urbanization, structure, function, processes, and evolution of urban socio-ecological systems, urban metabolism, urban sustainability experiments and transition, cities and climate change, and urban environmental policy and governance, and cross-scale translations between planetary level boundaries and targets into cities.

Bai's early work studied the urban environment of East Asia and sustainability experiments in Asia. She has also examined the linkages between urbanization and economic growth, human well-being, and the environment. More recently, she has characterized China's urbanization plan, and defined future research plans for sustainable cities.

== Selected publications ==
As of 2024, Bai has over 35,900 citations to her work at Google Scholar and an h-index of 64.

- Bai, X. (2024). Build networked resilience across cities. Science, 383(6687), eado5304. https://doi.org/10.1126/science.ado5304
- Bai, X. (2024). Post-2030 global goals need explicit targets for cities and businesses. Science, 385(6714), eadq4993. https://doi.org/10.1126/science.adq4993
- Bai, X., Hasan, S., Andersen, L. S., Bjørn, A., Kilkiş, Ş., Ospina, D., Liu, J., Cornell, S. E., Sabag Muñoz, O., De Bremond, A., Crona, B., DeClerck, F., Gupta, J., Hoff, H., Nakicenovic, N., Obura, D., Whiteman, G., Broadgate, W., Lade, S. J., Rocha, J., Rockström, J., Stewart-Koster, B., Van Vuuren, D., & Zimm, C. (2024). Translating Earth system boundaries for cities and businesses. Nature Sustainability, 7(2), 108–119. https://doi.org/10.1038/s41893-023-01255-w
- Gupta, J., Bai, X., Liverman, D. M., Rockström, J., Qin, D., Stewart-Koster, B., Rocha, J. C., Jacobson, L., Abrams, J. F., Andersen, L. S., Armstrong McKay, D. I., Bala, G., Bunn, S. E., Ciobanu, D., DeClerck, F., Ebi, K. L., Gifford, L., Gordon, C., Hasan, S., Kanie, N., Lenton, T. M., Loriani, S., Mohamed, A., Nakicenovic, N., Obura, D., Ospina, D., Prodani, K., Rammelt, C., Sakschewski, B., Scholtens, J., Tharammal, T., Van Vuuren, D., Verburg, P. H., Winkelmann, R., Zimm, C., Bennett, E., Bjørn, A., Bringezu, S., Broadgate, W. J., Bulkeley, H., Crona, B., Green, P. A., Hoff, H., Huang, L., Hurlbert, M., Inoue, C. Y. A., Kılkış, Ş., Lade, S. J., Liu, J., Nadeem, I., Ndehedehe, C., Okereke, C., Otto, I. M., Pedde, S., Pereira, L., Schulte-Uebbing, L., Tàbara, J. D., De Vries, W., Whiteman, G., Xiao, C., Xu, X., Zafra-Calvo, N., Zhang, X., Fezzigna, P., & Gentile, G. (2024). A just world on a safe planet: A Lancet Planetary Health–Earth Commission report on Earth-system boundaries, translations, and transformations. The Lancet Planetary Health, 8(10), e813–e873. https://doi.org/10.1016/S2542-5196(24)00042-1
- Bai, X. (2023). Make the upcoming IPCC Cities Special Report count. Science, 382(6670), eadl1522. https://doi.org/10.1126/science.adl1522
- Stewart-Koster, B., Bunn, S. E., Green, P., Ndehedehe, C., Andersen, L. S., Armstrong McKay, D. I., Bai, X., DeClerck, F., Ebi, K. L., Gordon, C., Gupta, J., Hasan, S., Jacobson, L., Lade, S. J., Liverman, D., Loriani, S., Mohamed, A., Nakicenovic, N., Obura, D., Qin, D., Rammelt, C., Rocha, J. C., Rockström, J., Verburg, P. H., & Zimm, C. (2023). Living within the safe and just Earth system boundaries for blue water. Nature Sustainability, 7(1), 53–63. https://doi.org/10.1038/s41893-023-01247-w
- Rockström, J., Gupta, J., Qin, D., Lade, S. J., Abrams, J. F., Andersen, L. S., Armstrong McKay, D. I., Bai, X., Bala, G., Bunn, S. E., Ciobanu, D., DeClerck, F., Ebi, K., Gifford, L., Gordon, C., Hasan, S., Kanie, N., Lenton, T. M., Loriani, S., Liverman, D. M., Mohamed, A., Nakicenovic, N., Obura, D., Ospina, D., Prodani, K., Rammelt, C., Sakschewski, B., Scholtens, J., Stewart-Koster, B., Tharammal, T., Van Vuuren, D., Verburg, P. H., Winkelmann, R., Zimm, C., Bennett, E. M., Bringezu, S., Broadgate, W., Green, P. A., Huang, L., Jacobson, L., Ndehedehe, C., Pedde, S., Rocha, J., Scheffer, M., Schulte-Uebbing, L., De Vries, W., Xiao, C., Xu, C., Xu, X., Zafra-Calvo, N., & Zhang, X. (2023). Safe and just Earth system boundaries. Nature, 619(7968), 102–111. https://doi.org/10.1038/s41586-023-06083-8
- Ecosystems and human well-being : synthesis. Millennium Ecosystem Assessment. Washington, DC: Island Press. 2005. ISBN 1-59726-040-1. OCLC 59279709.
- Bai, Xuemei; Shi, Peijun; Liu, Yansui (8 May 2014). "Society: Realizing China's urban dream". Nature. 509 (7499): 158–160. Bibcode:2014Natur.509..158B. doi:10.1038/509158a. hdl:1885/65934. ISSN 0028-0836. PMID 24812683.
- Bai, Xuemei; van der Leeuw, Sander; O’Brien, Karen; Berkhout, Frans; Biermann, Frank; Brondizio, Eduardo S.; Cudennec, Christophe; Dearing, John; Duraiappah, Anantha; Glaser, Marion; Revkin, Andrew (1 July 2016). "Plausible and desirable futures in the Anthropocene: A new research agenda". Global Environmental Change. 39: 351–362. doi:10.1016/j.gloenvcha.2015.09.017. ISSN 0959-3780. S2CID 73698769.

== Awards and honors ==
Bai was elected a fellow of Academy of the Social Sciences in Australia in 2017. She was the 2018 Laureate of the Volvo Environment Prize, and was named one of the World's 100 Most Influential People in Climate Change Policy by Apolitical in 2019. In 2021, Bai received the Global Economy Prize from the Kiel Institute for the World Economy.
