= NCAR LSM 1.0 =

The National Center for Atmospheric Research Land Surface Model (LSM) is a unidimensional computational model developed by Gordon Bonan that describes ecological processes joined in many ecosystem models, hydrological processes found in hydrological models and flow of surface common in surface models using atmospheric models.

In this way, the model examines interactions especially biogeophysics (sensible and latent heat, momentum, albedo, emission of long waves) and biogeochemistry (CO_{2}) of the land-atmosphere the effect of surface of the land in the climate and composition of the atmosphere.

This model has a simplified treatment of the surface flows that reproduce at the very least computational cost the essential characteristics of the important interactions of the land-atmosphere for climatic simulations.

As the types of surface vegetated for some species are several, have a standardization of types of covering being enclosed surfaces covered with water as lakes (amongst others); thus the model wheel for each point of independent form, with the same average of the atmospheric interactions. The model functions in a space grating that can vary of a point until global.
