= Yoshitaka Ota =

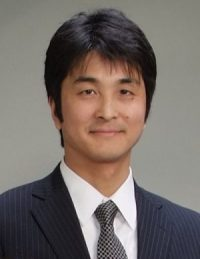
- Education: University College London
- Scientific career
- Fields: Anthropology, marine policy
- Workplaces: Nereus Program; University of British Columbia; Changing Ocean Research Unit; University of Washington

Yoshitaka Ota is a social anthropologist, specializing in indigenous fisheries, climate change risk, global ocean governance, sustainable fishing business solutions, and coastal management and research communication. He is currently employed as the Nereus Program Director (Policy) and as a research assistant professor for the School of Marine and Environmental Affairs at the University of Washington.

== Background ==
Ota completed his B.Sc. (1995), M.Sc. (1998), and Ph.D. (2006) in anthropology at the University College London. In 2000–2001, he completed 18 months of fieldwork in Palau, Micronesia, in support of his Ph.D. research. Between 2003 and 2005, Ota was employed as a research assistant in the department of anthropology at the University of Kent, conducting research on artisanal fishing. From 2005 to 2009, he was a research associate at the Durrell Institute of Conservation and Ecology, working on several projects related to fisheries management. From 2009 to 2011, he was a policy research fellow in the Ocean Policy Research Foundation in Tokyo, Japan.

== Current Activities ==
Since 2011, Ota has been director (policy) at the Nereus Program, an interdisciplinary ocean research initiative between the non-profit Nippon Foundation and the University of British Columbia.

In January 2016, a study on the impacts of climate change on First Nations fisheries in British Columbia received significant media attention. In November of that year, he was quoted by the Nikkei Asian Review in a piece on fish consumption, saying "Aquaculture could potentially cover the future gap created in our diet due to fish stock loss. [However, the] aquacultured fish that are increasing in volume, such as catfish or tilapia, are not the species preferred for consumption by all countries. Therefore it won't fill the gap unless we change our consumption preferences."

Ota led a study in 2016 on global seafood consumption by coastal indigenous peoples, which involved building a database of more than 1,900 indigenous communities and finding that coastal indigenous peoples consume nearly four times more seafood per capita than the global average. The study attracted attention in the Washington Post, CBC News, and Newsweek.

== Select media coverage ==
- Newsweek: What Seafood Consumption Can Tell Us About Environmental Sustainability. January 31, 2017.
- The Conversation: For indigenous communities, fish mean much more than food. January 29, 2017.
- Washington Post: Indigenous peoples of the world’s coastlines are losing their fisheries — and their way of life. December 2, 2016.
- CBC News: Coastal Indigenous people eat 15 times more seafood than non-Indigenous, study reveals. December 3, 2016.
- Washington Post: Scientists say climate change is threatening the lifeblood of Canada’s native people. January 13, 2016.
- CTV News: Net loss: First Nations fisheries threatened by climate change, study says. January 13, 2016.
- The Vancouver Sun: New study predicts significant declines in B.C. native fish catches due to climate change. January 13, 2016.
- CBS News: Climate change could drain global seafood supplies. July 2, 2015

== Select publications ==
- Kittinger, J. N., Teh, L. C. L., Allison, E. H., Bennett, N. J., Crowder, L. B., Finkbeiner, E. M., Hicks. C., Scarton, C. G., Nakamura, K., Ota, Y., Young, J., Alifano, A., Apel, A., Arbib, A. Bishop, L., Boyle, M., Cisneros-Montemayor, A. M., Hunter, P., Cornu, E. L., Levine, M., Jones, R. S., Koehn, Z., Marschke, M., Mason, J. G., Micheli, F., McClenachan, L., Opal, C., Peacey, J., Peckham, S. H., Schemmel, E., Solis-Rivera, V., Swartz, W., Wilhelm, T. A., 2017. Committing to socially responsible seafood. Science, 356(6341): 912–913.
- Bennett, N. J., Teh, L., Ota, Y., Christie, P., Ayers, A., Day, J.C., Franks, P., Gill, D., Gruby, R. L., Kittinger, J. N., 2017, An appeal for a code of conduct for marine conservation. Marine Policy, 81: 411–418,
- Swartz. W. Schiller, L. Sumaila, R. Ota. Y. (2017). Searching for market-based sustainability pathways: challenges and opportunities for Japan’s seafood eco-labels. Marine Policy.
- Cisneros, A. Weatherdon, L. Pauly, D. Ota. Y. (2016). A Global Estimate of Seafood Consumption by Coastal Indigenous Peoples. PLOS ONE.
- Cheung W., Jones M., Lam V., Miller D., Ota Y., Teh L., Sumaila U., 2016. Transform high seas management to build climate resilience in marine seafood supply.Fish and Fisheries.
- Weatherdon L., Ota Y., Jones M., Close D., Cheung W., 2016. Projected Scenarios for Coastal First Nations’ Fisheries Catch Potential under Climate Change: Management Challenges and Opportunities. PLoS ONE.
- Tanaka T., Ota Y., 2015. Reviving the Seto Inland Sea, Japan: Applying the Principles of Satoumi for Marine Ranching Project in Okayama. Marine Productivity: Perturbations and Resilience of Socio-ecosystems, pages 291–294.
- Merrie, A.; Dunn, D.C.; Metian, M.; Boustany, A.M.; Takei, Y.; Elferink, A.O.; Ota, Y.; Christensen, V.; Halpin, P.N.; Österblom, H. (2014). "An ocean of surprises – Trends in human use, unexpected dynamics and governance challenges in areas beyond national jurisdiction". Global Environmental Change. 27: 19–31. Bibcode:2014GEC....27...19M. doi:10.1016/j.gloenvcha.2014.04.012. hdl:1874/306748. S2CID 27650514.
- Hanich Q.A., Ota Y., 2013, Moving beyond rights-based management: a transparent approach to distributing the conservation burden and benefit in tuna fisheries. Humanities and the Arts - Papers, pages 135–170.
- Österblom, H.; Merrie, A.; Metian, M.; Boonstra, W.J.; Blenckner, R.; Watson, J.R.; Rykaczewski, R.R.; Ota, Y.; Sarmiento, J.L.; Christensen, V.; Schlüter, M.; Birnbaum, S.; Gustavsson, B.G.; Humborg, C.; Mörth, C-M.; Müeller-Karulis, B.; Tomczak, M.T.; Troell, M.; Folke, C. (2013). "Modeling social-ecological scenarios in marine systems". BioScience. 63 (9): 735–744. doi:10.1525/bio.2013.63.9.9.
