= Daniel Pauly =

French-born marine biologist (born 1946)

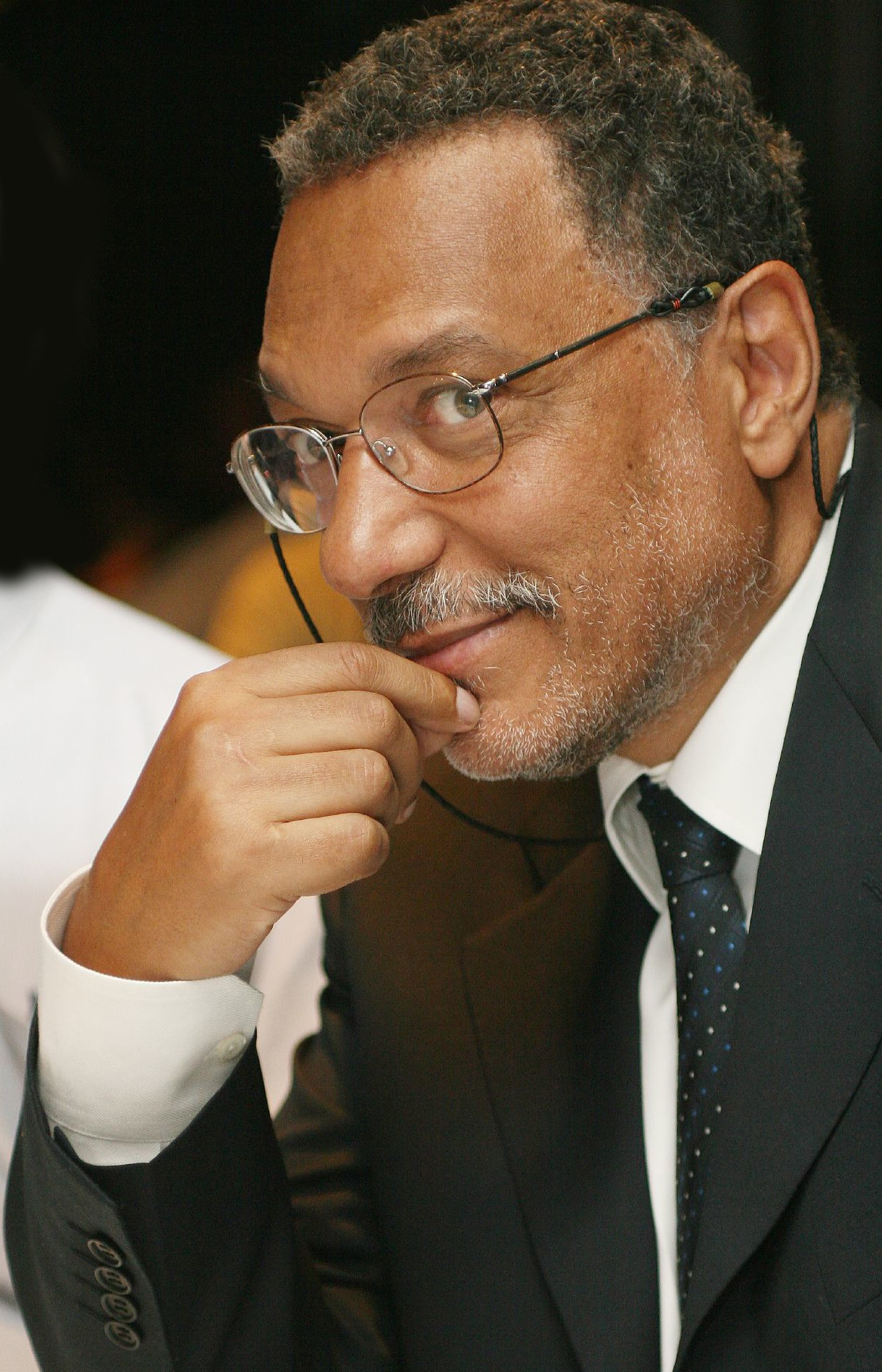
- Born: May 2, 1946 (age 80); Paris, France
- Education: University of Kiel
- Known for: Sea Around Us Project; Shifting baselines Fishing down marine food webs FishBase; Ecopath with Ecosim
- Awards: International Cosmos Prize (2005); Volvo Environment Prize (2006); Ramon Margalef Prize in Ecology (2008); Albert Ier Grand Medal in Science (2016); Ocean Award (2017)
- Scientific career
- Fields: Marine biologist, fisheries scientist
- Workplaces: International Center for Living Aquatic Resources Management; UBC Fisheries Centre; University of British Columbia
- Doctoral advisor: Gotthilf Hempel

Daniel Pauly is a French-born marine biologist, well known for his work in studying human impacts on global fisheries and in 2020 was the most cited fisheries scientist in the world. He is a professor and the project leader of the Sea Around Us initiative at the Institute for the Oceans and Fisheries at the University of British Columbia. He also served as Director of the UBC Fisheries Centre from November 2003 to October 2008.

In February 2023 Pauly was the co-recipient of the 2023 Tyler Prize for Environmental Achievement, with Ussif Rashid Sumaila. The award has been described as the ‘Nobel Prize for the Environment.’

== Biography ==
Pauly was born in Paris, France. He grew up, however, in La Chaux de Fonds, Switzerland in what was called a strange "Dickensian" childhood where he was forced to stay as a live-in servant to a new family. For the first 16 years of his life, Pauly lived an inward life as he was mixed race in an all-white town, finding solace in books/reading and model construction. At 16 he ran away and put himself through high school in Wuppertal, Germany. After one year working with disabled people for a local church-run institution. His work led to a scholarship to the University of Kiel.

It was at the University of Kiel where Pauly decided on fisheries biology. He said he wanted to work in the tropics because he felt that he would "fit in" better there. He also wanted to devote his life to an applied job where he could help people.

He did a master's degree at Kiel University at Gotthilf Hempel lab on "The ecology and fishery of a small West African lagoon". Pauly then spent two years conducting trawling surveys as a member of a German-Indonesian project aiming at introducing this relatively new gear. He began to write on tropical fisheries management; later his emphasis switched to global fisheries trends and conservation.

Pauly completed his Ph.D. at Kiel University in Germany supervised by Hempel, in which he established strong relationships between the surface area of gills and the growth of fishes and aquatic (gill-breathing) invertebrates. His dissertation laid the foundation for his Gill-Oxygen Limitation Theory, which he would later develop in more detail.

Daniel Pauly in conversation with Silver Donald Cameron about his work.

After his Ph.D., Pauly worked for 15 years at the International Center for Living and Aquatic Resources Management (ICLARM), in Manila, Philippines. Early in his career at ICLARM, Pauly worked in the tropics and developed new methods for estimating fish populations. Pauly helped to design, implement, and perfect methods using length-frequency data instead of the age of fish to estimate parameters of fisheries statistics such as growth and mortality.

Later, he helped develop two major projects: ELEFAN and FishBase. ELEFAN (ELectronic Length Frequency ANalysis) made it possible to use length-frequency data to estimate the growth and mortality of fishes. FishBase is an online encyclopedia of fish and fisheries information comprising information on more than 30,000 different species. Both projects received worldwide attention and through multiple upgrades and additions, are still prominent in fisheries biology.

Through the 1990s, Pauly’s work centered on the effects of overfishing. The author of several books and more than 500 scientific papers, Pauly is a prolific writer and communicator. He developed the concept of shifting baselines in 1995 and authored the seminal paper, Fishing down marine food webs, in 1998. For working to protect the environment, he earned a place in the "Scientific American 50" in 2003, the same year The New York Times labeled him an "iconoclast". Pauly won the International Cosmos Prize in 2005, the Volvo Environment Prize in 2006, the Excellence in Ecology Prize and Ted Danson Ocean Hero Award in 2007, the Ramon Margalef Prize in Ecology and Environmental Sciences in 2008, and the Nierenberg Prize for Science in the Public Interest from the Scripps Institution of Oceanography in 2012. In 2015, Pauly received the Peter Benchley Ocean Award for Excellence in Science. In 2016, he was honored in Paris with the Albert Ier Grand Medal in the Science category. In 2017, he received, together with Dirk Zeller as part of the Sea Around Us leading team, the Ocean Award in the Science category.

Also in 2017 and specifically on French National Day, he was named Chevalier de la Légion D’Honneur.

Pauly has written several books, including Darwin's Fishes (Cambridge University Press), Five Easy Pieces: How Fishing Impacts Marine Ecosystems (Island Press) and Gasping Fish and Panting Squids: Oxygen, Temperature and the Growth of Water-Breathing Animals.

== Views ==
To date, he frequently expresses opinions about public policy. Specifically, he argues that governments should abolish subsidies to fishing fleets and establish marine reserves. He is a member of the Board of Oceana. In a 2009 article written for The New Republic, Pauly compares today's fisheries to a global Ponzi scheme.

== Publications ==
- Publications by Daniel Pauly

Select publications

- Pauly D and Müller J (2026) Breathing water in a warming world: Principles and Applications of the Gill-Oxygen Limitation Theory. Sidestone Press. https://doi.org/10.59641/k3n9h0i1j2
- Pauly D (2019) Vanishing Fish: Shifting baselines and the future of global fisheries Greystone Books ISBN 978-1-77164-398-6
- Cheung W. and Pauly D (2017). Sound physiological knowledge and principles in modelling shrinking of fishes under climate change. Global Change Biology 24:e15–e26
- Pauly D and Zeller D (2016) Catch reconstructions reveal that global marine fisheries catches are higher than reported and declining. Nature Communications, 1-9.
- Pauly D (2010) 5 easy pieces: how fishing impacts marine ecosystems Island Press. ISBN 978-1-59726-719-9.
- Pauly D (2009) "Aquacalypse Now" The New Republic, September 28.
- Pauly D, Christensen V, Guénette S, Pitcher TJ, Sumaila UR, Walters CJ, Watson R, Zeller D (2002) "Towards sustainability in world fisheries" Nature, 418: 689-695.
- Pauly D (1998) "Why squids, though not fish, may be better understood by pretending they are". In: Payne, A.I.L., Lipinkski, M.R., Clarke, M.R. and Roeleveld, M.A.C. (eds.). Cephalopod biodiversity, Ecology and Evolution. South African Journal of Marine Science, 20: 47-58.
- Pauly D, Christensen V, Dalsgaard J, Froese R and Torres F (1998) "Fishing down marine food webs" Science, 279: 860-863.
- Pauly D (1998) "Beyond our original horizons: the tropicalization of Beverton and Holt". Reviews in Fish Biology and Fisheries, 8(3): 307-334.
- Pauly D (1995) "Anecdotes and the shifting baseline syndrome of fisheries". TREE 10(10): 430
- Pauly D and Christensen V (1995) "Primary production required to sustain global fisheries" Nature, 374(6519): 255-257.
- Pauly D (1981) "The relationships between gill surface area and growth performance in fish: a generalization of von Bertalanffy’s theory of growth". Berichte der Deutschen Wissenchaftlichen Kommission für Meeresforschung, 28(4): 251-282.
- Pauly D (1981) "On the interrelationships between natural mortality, growth parameters and mean environmental temperature in 175 fish stocks". Journal du Conseil international pour l'Exploration de la Mert, 39(3): 175-192.
- Pauly D and David N (1981) "ELEFAN I, a BASIC, program for the objective extraction of growth parameters from length-frequency data". Reports on Marine Research, pp. 205–211.
