= Timothy R. Parsons =

Canadian oceanographer (1932–2022)

Timothy Richard Parsons, OC FRSC (1 November 1932 – 11 April 2022) was a Canadian oceanographer and the first Canadian to receive a Japan Prize.

== Background and career ==
Tim Parsons was born in Colombo, Ceylon, and received a Bachelor of Science degree in 1953, a Master of Science degree in 1955, and a Ph.D. in 1958 all, from McGill University. He began his research career at the federal government's Pacific Biological Station in Nanaimo, British Columbia, before becoming a Professor of Oceanography at the University of British Columbia from 1972 until his retirement in 1992, and subsequently an Honorary Research Scientist at the Institute of Ocean Sciences in Sidney, British Columbia, Canada.

== Contributions ==
Parsons was a biological oceanographer with a strong scientific interest in the application of oceanography for the solution of problems in fisheries and ocean pollution. His lifetime work has been to establish a new ecosystem approach for the management of fisheries using oceanographic information. He has followed a research program of developing methods, conducting large scale experiments using mesocosms and making observations in the Gulf of Alaska and the Beaufort Sea. Some of his seminal contributions included his deep involvement in the Controlled Ecosystem Pollution Experiment (CEPEX), his authorship of a widely used textbook and a manual of seawater analysis.

== Honours ==
He became a Fellow of the Royal Society of Canada in 1979, was the first and remains the only Canadian to be awarded the Japan Prize in 2001, and was invested as an Officer of the Order of Canada, in 2005. In 2007, he received an honorary Doctoral degree in Science from the University of Victoria.

== Death ==
Parsons died on 11 April 2022 in Victoria, British Columbia, Canada.
