= Ussif Rashid Sumaila =

Canadian professor of ocean and fisheries economics

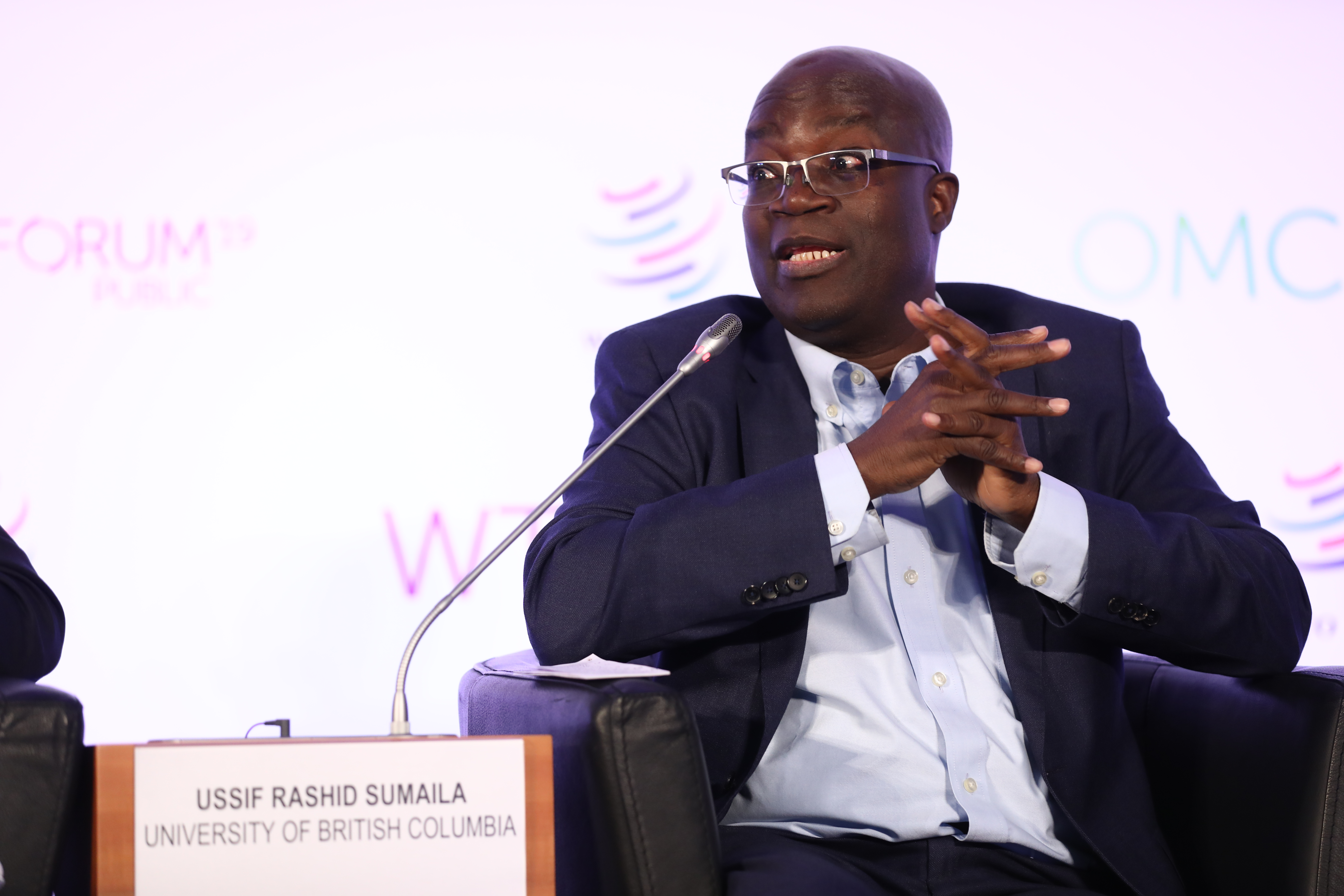

Academic background
- Education: University of Bergen (Ph.D.); University of Bergen (M.Sc.); Ahmadu Bello University (B.Sc.)

Academic work
- Discipline: Economics
- Institutions: UBC Institute for the Oceans and Fisheries; Liu Institute for Global Issues; University of British Columbia
- Notable ideas: Resource economics
- Website: Information at IDEAS / RePEc

Ussif Rashid Sumaila is a professor of ocean and fisheries economics at the University of British Columbia, Canada, and the Director of the Fisheries Economics Research Unit at the UBC Institute for the Oceans and Fisheries (formerly known as the UBC Fisheries Centre). He is also appointed with the UBC School of Public Policy and Global Affairs. He specializes in bioeconomics, marine ecosystem valuation and the analysis of global issues such as fisheries subsidies, IUU (illegal, unreported and unregulated) fishing and the economics of high and deep seas fisheries. Sumaila has experience working in fisheries and natural resource projects in Norway, Canada and the North Atlantic region, Namibia and the Southern African region, Ghana and the West African region and Hong Kong and the South China Sea. He received his Bachelor of Science degree with honours from Ahmadu Bello University University in Nigeria and received his PhD from Bergen University in Norway.

In February 2023 Sumaila was the co-recipient of the 2023 Tyler Prize for Environmental Achievement, with Daniel Pauly, which has been described as the ‘Nobel Prize for the Environment.’

Sumaila's work on international fisheries subsidies has been influential in the Doha Round of WTO negotiations concerning subsidies and countervailing measures. Expert advice from Sumaila has been sought by the White House, United Nations, Asian Development Bank, and Parliament in Canada and the United Kingdom. Sumaila has also been featured in the popular documentary End of the Line.

== Current projects ==
Scientific Director for Ocean Canada

Lead author, Conditions Working Group of the Millennium Assessment Research Group WorldFish Centre, Penang, Malaysia.

Lead editor, Fisheries chapter of the United Nations Green Economy Report.

== Journal contributions ==
He has published articles in several journals including, Journal of Environmental Economics and Management, Journal of Bioeconomics, Land Economics, ICES Journal of Marine Science, Environmental and Resource Economics and Ecological Economics. Sumaila's work has generated a great deal of interest, and has been cited by, among others, the Economist, the Boston Globe, the International Herald Tribune and the Vancouver Sun.

Selected Publications

- Brooks, C.M., Larry B. Crowder1, Lisa M. Curran, Robert B. Dunbar, David G. Ainley, Klaus J. Dodds, Kristina M. Gjerde, U. Rashid Sumaila (2016). Science-based management in decline in the Southern Ocean. Science (2016).
- Cisneros-Montemayor, A. M., W. W. L Cheung, K. Bodtker, L. S. L. Teh, N. Steiner, M. Bailey, C. Hoover, U. R. Sumaila (2016). Canadian Journal of Fisheries and Aquatic Sciences.
- Teh, L.S.L., A. Witter, W.W.L. Cheung, U.R. Sumaila, X. Yin (2016). What is at stake? Status and threats to South China Sea marine fisheries Ambio doi:10.1007/s13280-016-0819-0.
- Sumaila, U. R. (2016). Socio-economic benefits of Large Marine Ecosystem valuation: The case of Benguela Large Marine Ecosystem. Environmental Development, 17, 244–248.
- Sumaila, U.R.', C. Bellmann, A. Tipping (2016). Fishing for the future: An overview of challenges and opportunities. Marine Policy, 69, 173–180.
- Cinner, J. E., Huchery, C., MacNeil, M. A., Graham, N. A., McClanahan, T. R., Maina, J., ... Sumaila, U. R. & Allison, E. H. (2016). Bright spots among the world’s coral reefs. Nature, 535(7612), 416–419.
- Sumaila, U.R., V. Lam, F. Le Manach, W. Swartz and D. Pauly (2016). Global fisheries subsidies: an updated estimate. Marine Policy, 69, 189–193.
- Miller, D. D., Sumaila, U. R., Copeland, D., Zeller, D., Soyer, B., Nikaki, T., ... & Pauly, D. (2016). Cutting a lifeline to maritime crime: marine insurance and IUU fishing. Frontiers in Ecology and the Environment. doi:10.1002/fee.1293.
- Bailey M., Favaro B., Otto S., Charles A., Devillers R., Metaxas A., Tyedmers P., Ban N., Mason T., Hoover C., Duck T.J., Fanning L., Milley C., Cisneros-Montemayor A.M., Pauly D., Cheung W.W., Cullis-Suzuki S., Teh L., and Sumaila U.R. (2016). The imperative of realigning ocean policy with ocean science. Marine Policy, 63: 53–60.
- Gattuso, J.-P., Magnan, A., Billé, R., Cheung, W. W. L., Howes, E. L., Joos, F., Allemand, D., Bopp, L., Cooley, S., Eakin, C.M., Hoegh-Guldberg, O., Kelly, R.P. Sumaila, U.R. et al. (2015). Contrasting futures for ocean and society from different CO2 emissions scenarios. Science 349 (6243).
- Cheung, W.W.L. and Sumaila, U.R. (2015). Economic incentives and overfishing: a bioeconomic vulnerability index. Mar Ecol Prog Ser, 530: 223–232.
- Gordon R. Munro and Sumaila, U. R. (2015). On the Contributions of Colin Clark to Fisheries Economics. Environmental and Resource Economics.
- Teh, L.S.L and Sumaila, U.R. (2015). Global analysis of temporal trends in shared fisheries. Mar Ecol Prog Ser 530: 243–254.
- Sumaila, U.R., Hotte, N., Galli, A., Lam, V.W.Y., Cisneros-Montemayor, A.M. and Wackernagel, M. (2015). Eco2: A simple index of economic-ecological deficits. Mar Ecol Prog Ser 530: 271–279.
- Sumaila, U.R, Vicky W.Y. Lam, Dana D. Miller, Louise Teh, Reg A. Watson, Dirk Zeller, William W.L. Cheung, Isabelle M. Côté, Alex D. Rogers, Callum Roberts, Enric Sala, Daniel Pauly (2015). Winners and losers in a world where the high seas is closed to fishing. Scientific Reports.
- Ekeland, I., Karp, L. and Sumaila, U.R. (2015). Equilibrium resource management with altruistic overlapping generations. Journal of Environmental Economics and Management, 70, 1–16.
- Díaz, S., Demissew, S., Carabias, J., Joly, C., Lonsdale, M., Ash, N., Sumaila, U.R. ... & Driver, A. (2015). The IPBES Conceptual Framework—connecting nature and people. Current Opinion in Environmental Sustainability, 14, 1–16.
- Tittensor, D.P., Walpole, M., Hill, S.L.L., Sumaila U.R., Teh, L.S.L et al. (2014). A mid-term analysis of progress toward international biodiversity targets. Science 346(6206), 241–244.
- Sumaila, U. R., and Bawumia, M. (2014). Fisheries, ecosystem justice and piracy: A case study of Somalia. Fisheries Research, 157, 154–163.
- Sumaila, U.R., Dyck, A., and Baske, A. (2014). Subsidies to tuna fisheries in the Western Pacific Ocean. Marine Policy 43: 288–294.
- Teh, L.S.L., Teh, L.C.L., and Sumaila, U.R. (2014). Time preference of small-scale fishers in open access and traditionally managed reef fisheries. Marine Policy 44: 222–231.
- Teh, L.S.L., Teh, L.C.L., and Sumaila, U.R. (2013). A global estimate of the number of coral reef fishers. PLOS ONE 8(6), e65397.
- Sumaila, U.R. (2013). How to make progress in disciplining overfishing subsidies. ICES Journal of Marine Science: Journal du Conseil 70 (2), 251–258.
- Teh, L.S.L., Teh, L.C.L., Sumaila, U.R., and Cheung, W.W.L. (2013). Time Discounting and the Overexploitation of Coral Reefs. Environmental and Resource Economics 1-24.
- Swartz, W., Sumaila, U.R., and Watson, R. (2012). Global Ex-Vessel Fish Price Database revisited: a new approach for estimating ‘missing’ prices. Environmental and Resource Economics, DOI: 10.1007/s10640-012-9611-1.
- Halpern, B.S., Longo, C., Hardy, D., McLeod, K.L., Samhouri, J.F., Katona, S.K., Kleisner, K., Lester, S.E., O’Leary, J., Ranelletti, M., Rosenberg, A.A., Scarborough, C., Selig, E.R., Best, B.D., Brumbaugh, D.R., Chapin, F.S., Crowder, L.B., Daly, K.L., Doney, S.C., Elfes, C., Fogarty, M.J., Gaines, S.D., Jacobsen, K.I., Karrer, L.B., Leslie, H.M., Neeley, E., Pauly, D., Polasky, S., Ris, B., St. Martin, K., Stone, G.S., Sumaila, U.R., and Zeller, D. (2012). An index to assess the health and benefits of the global ocean. Nature, 488: 615–620.
- Sumaila, U.R., Cheung, W.W.L., Dyck, A., Gueye, K., Huang, L., Lam, V.W.Y., Pauly, D., Srinivasan, T., Swartz, W., Pauly, D., and Zeller, D. (2012). Benefits of rebuilding global marine fisheries outweigh costs. PLoS ONE 7(7), e40542, DOI: 10.1371/journal.pone.0040542.
- Sumaila, U.R. (2012). Seas, Oceans and Fisheries: A Challenge for Good Governance. The Round Table: The Commonwealth Journal of International Affairs 101(2), 157–166.
- Sumaila, U.R. (2012). Overfishing: Call to split fisheries at home and abroad. Nature 481, DOI:10.1038/481265c.
- Sumaila, U.R. and Huang, L. (2012). Managing Bluefin Tuna in the Mediterranean Sea. Marine Policy, 36, 502–511.
- Sumaila, U.R., Cisneros-Montemayor, A.M., Dyck, A., Huang, L., Cheung, W., Jacquet, J., Kleisner, K., Lam, V., McCrea-Strub, A., Swartz, W., Watson, R., Zeller, D. & Pauly, D. (2012). Impact of the Deepwater Horizon well blowout on the Economics of U.S. Gulf fisheries. Canadian Journal of Fisheries and Aquatic Sciences, 69, 499–510, DOI: 10.1139/f2011-171.
- Collette, B.B., Sumaila, U.R., and others (2011). High Value and Long Life—Double Jeopardy for Tunas and Billfishes. Science, 333, 291–292.

== Books and book contributions ==
Edited

- Sumaila, U.R. (2013). Game Theory and Fisheries: Essays on the Tragedy of Free for All Fishing. Routledge, London, UK, p. 178.
- Noone, K.J., Sumaila, U.R., and Diaz, R.J. (eds.) (2013). Managing Ocean Environments in a Changing Climate: Sustainability and Economic Perspectives. Elsevier, London, UK, p. 359.
- Bjørndal, T., Gordon, D.V., Arnason, R., and Sumaila, U.R. (eds.) (2006). Advances in Fisheries Economics: Papers in Honour of Professor Gordon Munro, Blackwell, Oxford, p. 308.
- Sumaila, U.R., Boyer, D., Skog, M., and Steinshamm, S.I. (eds.) (2004). Namibia's fisheries: Ecological, economic and social aspects. Eburon, Netherlands, p. 363.
- Kowero, G., Campbell, B.M., and Sumaila, U.R. (eds.) (2003). Policies and governance structures in woodlands of Southern Africa. CIFOR Press, Indonesia, p. 211.

Special Journal Issues

- Sumaila, U. R. and K. I. Stergiou (2015). Economics of marine conservation. Mar Ecol Prog Ser Vol. 530:177-279.
- Sumaila, U.R. (2015). On the Contributions of Colin Clark to Fisheries Economics Environmental and Resource Economics, May 2015, Volume 61, Issue 1. (editor of Special Issue).
- Sumaila, U.R., Arnason, R., and Lange, G.-M. (eds.) (2010). Global Fisheries Economics, Journal of Bioeconomics, 12, 179–268.
- Chuenpagdee, R. and Sumaila, U.R. (eds) (2010). Fisheries Governance. Fish and Fisheries, 11, 233–314.
- Sumaila, U.R., Adinar, A., and Albiac, J. (eds.) (2009). Game theoretic applications to environmental and natural resource problems. Environment and Development Economics, 14, 1–137.
- Sumaila, U.R., Charles, T., and Sylvia, G. (eds.) (2007). Topical Problems in Fisheries Economics: An Introduction. Marine Resource Economics.
- Sumaila, U.R., Munro, G., and Sutinen, J. (eds.) (2007). Recent Developments in Fisheries Economics. Special Issue of Land Economics, 83, 1–107.
- Sumaila, U.R. and Charles, A. (eds.) (2002a). Economics of protected marine areas. Special Issue of Natural Resource Modeling, 15 (3 ), 261–386.
- Sumaila, U.R. and Charles, A. (eds.) (2002b). Economics of protected marine areas. Special Issue of Natural Resource Modeling, 15 (4), 387–505. Climate, oceans and the law of special and general adaptation
- Alder, J. and Sumaila, U. R. (eds.) (2002). Social and economic aspects of protected marine areas implementation. Special Issue of Coastal Management, 30(2), 121–191.

== See also ==
- The End of the Line: How Overfishing Is Changing the World and What We Eat
- High Seas Fisheries Management
