= Jeffrey Polovina =

American marine scientist

- Born: September 30, 1948 (age 77); Troy, New York
- Education: Carnegie Mellon University and University of California, Berkeley
- Known for: Developing Ecopath

Jeffrey Polovina is an American marine scientist. He is known for creating the marine ecosystem model Ecopath.

== Early life ==
Jeffrey Joseph Polovina was born on September 30, 1948, in Troy, New York. He graduated from Carnegie Mellon University with an undergraduate degree in Mathematics, and received his PhD in Mathematical Statistics from University of California, Berkeley.

== Career ==
Polovina began his academic career teaching at University of California at San Diego, later moving to the University of Hawaii to conduct Sea Grant-funded aquaculture research. In 1979 he joined the National Marine Fisheries Service, Honolulu Lab which later became the Pacific Islands Fisheries Science Center, National Oceanic and Atmospheric Administration (NOAA), where he served as a senior scientist and the Chief of Ecosystem and Oceanography Division. In 2010 he received the Wooster Award from the North Pacific Marine Sciences Organization (PICES). He was awarded two Fulbright Senior Research Awards for work in Kenya and the Galapagos. He retired from NOAA in 2016 but continues to serve as an affiliate faculty in the Marine Biology Program at the University of Hawaii.

== Research ==
His research focuses on understanding the spatial and temporal dynamics of marine ecosystems with an emphasis on high tropic levels. In the early 1980s Polovina was part of a multi-disciplinary team studying the coral reef ecosystem at French Frigate Shoals in the Northwestern Hawaiian Islands. In order to describe the energy flow of the coral reef ecosystem Polovina developed the Ecopath Model. The model was later further expanded by colleagues at the Fisheries Center at the University of British Columbia and has become a global standard for marine ecosystem modeling. In 2007, the model was named one of the ten biggest scientific breakthroughs in the first 200 years of the US National Oceanic and Atmospheric Administration.

Polovina had used electronic tags and remotely-sensed oceanographic data to understand how large pelagic animals use oceanic habitats. This work led to identifying the trans-Pacific Transition Zone Chlorophyll Front (TZCF) as important Pacific Ocean mid-latitude forage and migration habitat. He used climate and ecosystem models and data to identify potential fishing and climate impacts on marine ecosystems. He has estimated that the Earth's least productive waters are growing at a rate of between 1 and 4 percent annually. He served as an author for the Hawaii Chapter of the 4th National Climate Assessment. He has also provided learning materials for PBS and provided other public educational services.
