= Robert H. Williams (physicist) =

American physicist

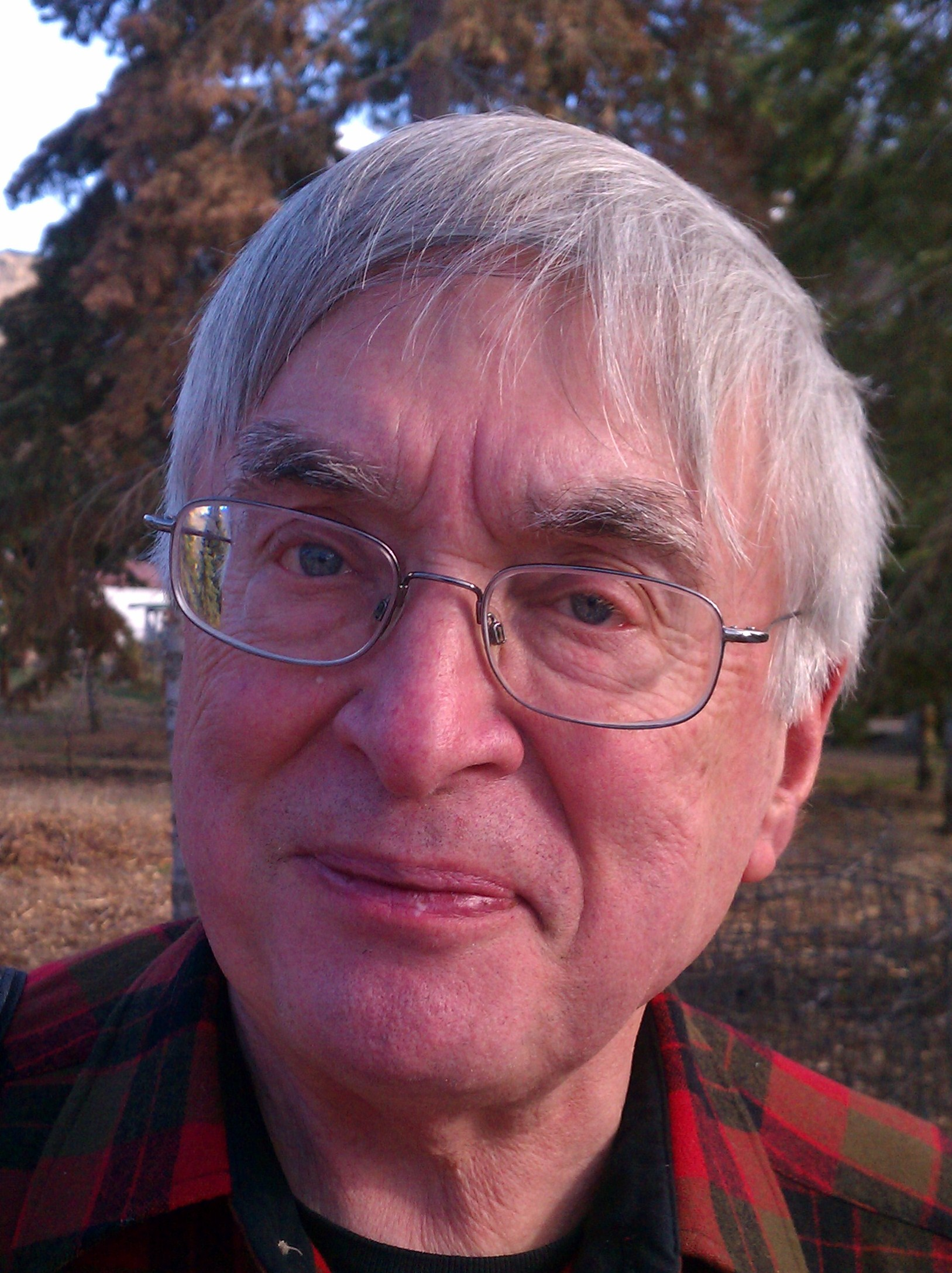
- Robert H. Williams, 2013
- Education: Yale University; University of California, Berkeley
- Awards: Max Born Medal and Prize; MacArthur Fellows Program; Volvo Environment Prize
- Scientific career
- Workplaces: University of Michigan; Ford Foundation; Princeton Environmental Institute

Robert H. Williams is a senior research scientist at the Princeton Environmental Institute (PEI), Princeton University.

He graduated from Yale University with a BS in physics in 1962, and from University of California, Berkeley with a PhD, in theoretical plasma physics, in 1967. He taught at University of Michigan, Physics Department, in 1970. In 1972, he became Chief Scientist of the Ford Foundation's Energy Policy Project.

== Awards ==
- 1988 Leo Szilard Award for Physics in the Public Interest
- 1989 Max Born Medal and Prize
- 1991 Sadi Carnot Award
- 1993 MacArthur Fellows Program
- 2000 Volvo Environment Prize

== Works ==
- "A Renewables-Intensive Global Energy Scenario", Renewable energy: sources for fuels and electricity, Editors Thomas B. Johansson, Laurie Burnham, Island Press, 1993, ISBN 978-1-55963-138-9
