= Ecosystem model =

Typically mathematical representation of an ecological system

A structural diagram of the open ocean plankton ecosystem model of Fasham, Ducklow & McKelvie (1990).

An ecosystem model is an abstract, usually mathematical, representation of an ecological system (ranging in scale from an individual population, to an ecological community, or even an entire biome), which is studied to better understand the real system.

Using data gathered from the field, ecological relationships—such as the relation of sunlight and water availability to photosynthetic rate, or that between predator and prey populations—are derived, and these are combined to form ecosystem models. These model systems are then studied in order to make predictions about the dynamics of the real system. Often, the study of inaccuracies in the model (when compared to empirical observations) will lead to the generation of hypotheses about possible ecological relations that are not yet known or well understood. Models enable researchers to simulate large-scale experiments that would be too costly or unethical to perform on a real ecosystem. They also enable the simulation of ecological processes over very long periods of time (i.e. simulating a process that takes centuries in reality, can be done in a matter of minutes in a computer model).

Ecosystem models have applications in a wide variety of disciplines, such as natural resource management, ecotoxicology and environmental health, agriculture, and wildlife conservation. Ecological modelling has even been applied to archaeology with varying degrees of success, for example, combining with archaeological models to explain the diversity and mobility of stone tools.

== Types of models ==
There are two major types of ecological models, which are generally applied to different types of problems: (1) analytic models and (2) simulation / computational models. Analytic models are typically relatively simple (often linear) systems, that can be accurately described by a set of mathematical equations whose behavior is well-known. Simulation models on the other hand, use numerical techniques to solve problems for which analytic solutions are impractical or impossible. Simulation models tend to be more widely used, and are generally considered more ecologically realistic, while analytic models are valued for their mathematical elegance and explanatory power. Ecopath is a powerful software system which uses simulation and computational methods to model marine ecosystems. It is widely used by marine and fisheries scientists as a tool for modelling and visualising the complex relationships that exist in real world marine ecosystems.

== Model design ==
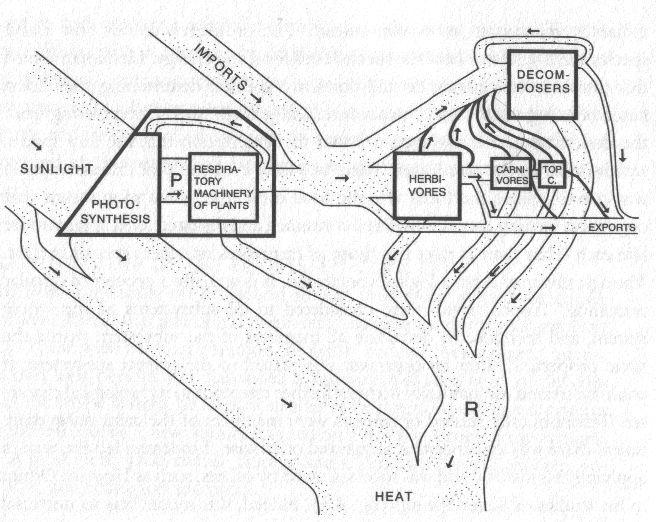
Diagram of the Silver Springs model (Odum, 1971). Note the aggregation into functional groups such as "herbivores" or "decomposers".

The process of model design begins with a specification of the problem to be solved, and the objectives for the model.

Ecological systems are composed of an enormous number of biotic and abiotic factors that interact with each other in ways that are often unpredictable, or so complex as to be impossible to incorporate into a computable model. Because of this complexity, ecosystem models typically simplify the systems they are studying to a limited number of components that are well understood, and deemed relevant to the problem that the model is intended to solve.

The process of simplification typically reduces an ecosystem to a small number of state variables and mathematical functions that describe the nature of the relationships between them. The number of ecosystem components that are incorporated into the model is limited by aggregating similar processes and entities into functional groups that are treated as a unit.

After establishing the components to be modeled and the relationships between them, another important factor in ecosystem model structure is the representation of space used. Historically, models have often ignored the confounding issue of space. However, for many ecological problems spatial dynamics are an important part of the problem, with different spatial environments leading to very different outcomes. Spatially explicit models (also called "spatially distributed" or "landscape" models) attempt to incorporate a heterogeneous spatial environment into the model. A spatial model is one that has one or more state variables that are a function of space, or can be related to other spatial variables.

== Validation ==
After construction, models are validated to ensure that the results are acceptably accurate or realistic. One method is to test the model with multiple sets of data that are independent of the actual system being studied. This is important since certain inputs can cause a faulty model to output correct results. Another method of validation is to compare the model's output with data collected from field observations. Researchers frequently specify beforehand how much of a disparity they are willing to accept between parameters output by a model and those computed from field data.

== Examples ==
=== The Lotka–Volterra equations ===
A sample time-series of the Lotka-Volterra model. Note that the two populations exhibit cyclic behaviour, and that the predator cycle lags behind that of the prey.

One of the earliest, and most well-known, ecological models is the predator-prey model of Alfred J. Lotka (1925) and Vito Volterra (1926). This model takes the form of a pair of ordinary differential equations, one representing a prey species, the other its predator.

$$\frac{dX}{dt} = \alpha . X - \beta . X . Y$$
$$\frac{dY}{dt} = \gamma . \beta . X . Y - \delta . Y$$

where,

- $X$ is the number/concentration of the prey species;
- $Y$ is the number/concentration of the predator species;
- $\alpha$ is the prey species' growth rate;
- $\beta$ is the predation rate of $Y$ upon $X$;
- $\gamma$ is the assimilation efficiency of $Y$;
- $\delta$ is the mortality rate of the predator species

Volterra originally devised the model to explain fluctuations in fish and shark populations observed in the Adriatic Sea after the First World War (when fishing was curtailed). However, the equations have subsequently been applied more generally. Although simple, they illustrate some of the salient features of ecological models: modelled biological populations experience growth, interact with other populations (as either predators, prey or competitors) and suffer mortality.

A credible, simple alternative to the Lotka-Volterra predator-prey model and its common prey dependent generalizations is the ratio dependent or Arditi-Ginzburg model. The two are the extremes of the spectrum of predator interference models. According to the authors of the alternative view, the data show that true interactions in nature are so far from the Lotka-Volterra extreme on the interference spectrum that the model can simply be discounted as wrong. They are much closer to the ratio dependent extreme, so if a simple model is needed one can use the Arditi-Ginzburg model as the first approximation.

=== Others ===
The theoretical ecologist Robert Ulanowicz has used information theory tools to describe the structure of ecosystems, emphasizing mutual information (correlations) in studied systems. Drawing on this methodology and prior observations of complex ecosystems, Ulanowicz depicts approaches to determining the stress levels on ecosystems and predicting system reactions to defined types of alteration in their settings (such as increased or reduced energy flow, and eutrophication.

Conway's Game of Life and its variations model ecosystems where proximity of the members of a population are factors in population growth.

== See also ==
- Compartmental models in epidemiology
- Dynamic global vegetation model
- Ecological forecasting
- Gordon Arthur Riley
- Land Surface Model (LSM version 1.0)
- Liebig's law of the minimum
- Mathematical biology
- Population dynamics
- Population ecology
- Rapoport's rule
- Scientific modelling
- System dynamics
