= Marine Policy =

- Discipline: Marine policy
- Language: English
- Edited by: S. Villasante

Publication details
- History: 1977–present
- Publisher: Elsevier (United Kingdom)
- Frequency: Monthly
- Impact factor: 3.5 (2023)

Standard abbreviations
- ISO 4: Mar. Policy

Indexing
- ISSN: 0308-597X
- LCCN: 77643816
- OCLC no.: 848521495

Links
- Journal homepage; Online access

Marine Policy is a monthly interdisciplinary peer-reviewed academic journal published by Elsevier concerning ocean policy studies, analyzing social science disciplines relevant to the formulation of marine policy. It was established in 1977 by founding editor Tony Loftas. The current editor-in-chief is Sebastián Villasante (University of Santiago de Compostela).

== Abstracting and indexing ==
According to the Journal Citation Reports, the journal has a 2023 impact factor of 3.5.

== See also ==
- List of international relations journals
