= UBC Institute for the Oceans and Fisheries =

Coordinates: 49.26362°N 123.25114°W

The UBC Institute for the Oceans and Fisheries (IOF) is a research unit at the University of British Columbia (UBC) that was formed in 2015 by incorporating members from the former UBC Fisheries Centre (est. 1991, dis. 2015), as well as a subset of researchers that are conducting marine related research at UBC. The IOF developed its own graduate program, which welcomed its first cohort of graduate students in September 2019. In addition to students of its OCF program (OCeans and Fisheries), members are also drawn from other graduate programs at UBC, primarily from the Institute for Resources, Environment and Sustainability, the Departments of Earth, Ocean and Atmospheric Sciences, Zoology, Geography, and Botany, and the School of Public Policy and Global Affairs. The UBC Institute for the Oceans and Fisheries brings together a community of Canadian and international experts in ocean and freshwater species, systems, economics, and issues to provide new insights into how global marine systems function, and the impacts of human activity on those systems. It is working towards a world in which the oceans are healthy and their resources are used sustainably and equitably. IOF is located at The University of British Columbia, and promotes multidisciplinary study of aquatic ecosystems and broad-based collaboration with researchers, educators, maritime communities, government, NGOs, and other partners.

== Research units ==
The IOF brings together a broad range of scientists to study both the ocean itself and the lives and livelihoods of coastal populations. Its research groups focus on issues of local significance in Western Canada, including the Salish Sea and Strait of Georgia, as well as broader global concerns such as artisanal fisheries in developing countries. It is constantly developing new research groups in response to emerging issues, trends and awareness.

IOF Research units	Leaders
Applied Freshwater Ecology Research Unit (AFERU)	Jordan Rosenfeld
Centre for Indigenous Fisheries	Andrea Reid & Dianne Newell
Changing Ocean Research Unit	William Cheung
Climate and Coastal Ecosystem Lab	Simon Donner
Coastal Marine Ecology	Chris Harley
Connecting Human and Natural Systems (CHANS) Lab	Kai Chan
Ecosystems Dynamics and Management Investigations Group (ECODIGM)	Murdoch McAllister
Fisheries Economics Research Unit (FERU)	Ussif Rashid Sumaila
Global Fisheries Cluster	Ussif Rashid Sumaila | William Cheung | | Daniel Pauly
Global Ocean Modeling	Villy Christensen
Hakai Coastal Initiative
Marine Mammal Energetics and Nutrition Lab (MMEANS)	David Rosen
Marine Mammal Research Unit	Andrew Trites
Marine Virology and Microbiology	Curtis Suttle
Marine Zooplankton and Micronekton Laboratory	Evgeny Pakhomov
OceanCanada Partnership	Ussif Rashid Sumaila
Ocean Pollution Research Unit	[Juan Jose Alava
Ocean Leaders	Simon Donner
Pelagic Ecosystems Lab	Brian Hunt
Project Seahorse	Amanda Vincent
Sea Around Us Project	Daniel Pauly
Statistical Ecology Research Group	Marie Auger-Méthé
