= Sea Around Us (organization) =

International research initiative

- Formation: July 1999
- Headquarters: Vancouver, British Columbia, Canada
- Official language: English, French
- Principal Investigator: Daniel Pauly
- Website: www.seaaroundus.org

The Sea Around Us is an international research initiative and a member of the Global Fisheries Cluster at the University of British Columbia. The Sea Around Us assesses the impact of fisheries on the marine ecosystems of the world and offers mitigating solutions to a range of stakeholders. To achieve this, the Sea Around Us presents fisheries and fisheries-related data at spatial scales that have ecological and policy relevance, such as by Exclusive Economic Zones, High Seas areas, Large Marine Ecosystems and Ecosystems.

All spatialized data are visualized either graphically or mapped, and all data can be downloaded. Global fisheries catches from 1950 to the present are available, under explicit consideration of coral reefs, seamounts, estuaries and other critical habitats of fish and marine invertebrates. The data presented, which are all freely available, are meant to support studies of global fisheries trends and the development of sustainable, ecosystem-based fisheries policies.

In the early 2000s, members of the Sea Around Us uncovered that China was overestimating its catches and showed that, when such distortions were removed from overall fisheries catches, global fisheries were actually declining since the late 1980s. The Sea Around Us also showed that the biomass of large fish in the North Atlantic is one-tenth of what it was only a century ago. Aquaculture, according to another study with members from the Project, cannot be expected to compensate for overfishing but is instead likely to exacerbate the problem due to the reliance on wild fish for fishmeal. In other words, without serious long-term planning, the oceans might get a lot worse before they get better.

In 2016, members of the Sea Around Us, using reconstructed global catch data that combine officially reported landings data with comprehensive estimates of unreported landings and discards, documented that, from 1950 to 2010, global catches were around 50% higher than reported data suggest. Furthermore, total catches seem to be declining faster from their peak catch in the mid-1990s than reported data would suggest.

The good news is that the discrepancy between reported data and estimated total catches is decreasing in more recent years, meaning that the comprehensiveness of data reported by countries seems to be improving.

All this information was compiled in the Global Atlas of Marine Fisheries, a 520-page book published in October 2016 by Island Press..

The Sea Around Us also communicates to broad audiences to convey the urgency to:

- Reduce excess fishing capacity (much of which is being 'exported' to developing countries).
- Eliminate damaging subsidies and create extensive networks of marine protected areas.
- Reconsider the current model of carnivorous aquaculture.
- Refocus fisheries to the small-scale sectors that are crucial to national food security concerns in developing countries.

The Sea Around Us was initiated in collaboration with The Pew Charitable Trusts in 1999, and in 2014, the Sea Around Us began a collaboration with The Paul G. Allen Family Foundation and its executive arm, Vulcan Inc., to provide African and Asian countries with more accurate and comprehensive fisheries data, and to redesign and revamp the Sea Around Us website.

In 2017, the Sea Around Us - Indian Ocean was formed at The University of Western Australia as a geographic node of the Sea Around Us initiative. The Sea Around Us - Indian Ocean is led by Professor Dirk Zeller.

Later on, in 2017, the Sea Around Us started a collaboration with the Minderoo Foundation, which is the parent organization of the Walk Free Foundation. One of the first products of this collaboration was the paper "Modern slavery and the race to fish".

== See also ==
- Rachel Carson, author of The Sea Around Us (1951), from which the project takes its name
- Daniel Pauly
- Fishing down the food web
- Vulcan Inc.
- The Pew Charitable Trusts
