= David Sims (biologist) =

British marine biologist

David W. Sims MAE
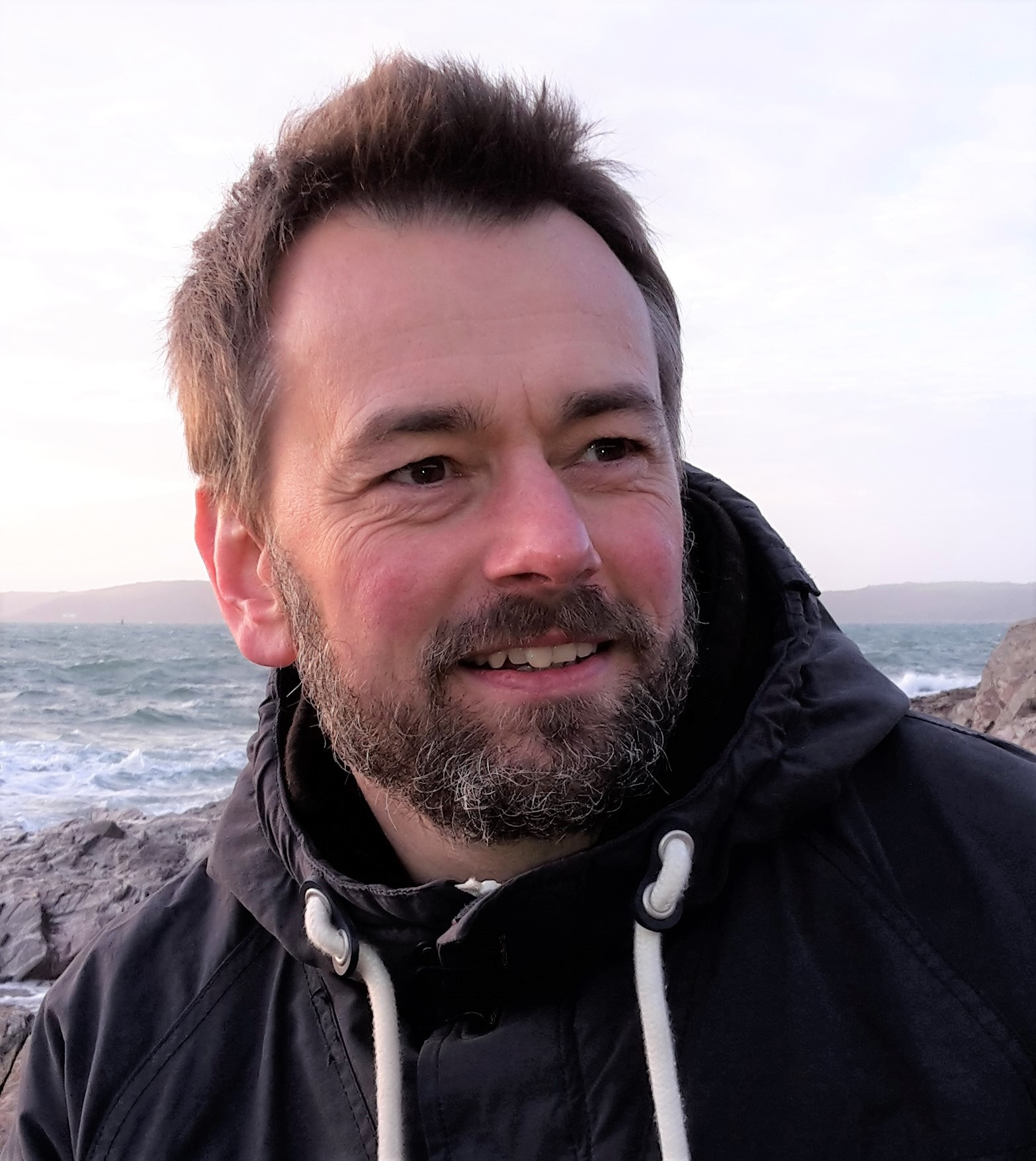
- David Sims at the Marine Biological Association in Plymouth, 2017
- Born: Worthing, West Sussex, UK
- Known for: Research on the behaviour of sharks
- Awards: Zoological Society of London Marsh Award (2019); Member of Academia Europaea, MAE (2016); Stanley Gray Silver Medal (2008); FSBI Medal (2007)
- Scientific career
- Fields: Marine biology
- Workplaces: University of Southampton; MBA Laboratory; University of Aberdeen; University of Plymouth
- Doctoral advisor: Quentin Bone
- Website: https://www.mba.ac.uk/movement-ecology-sims/

David William Sims MAE is a British marine biologist known for using satellite tracking to study wild behaviour of sharks and for the Global Shark Movement Project. He is Senior Research Fellow at the Laboratory of the Marine Biological Association (MBA) in Plymouth, and Professor of Marine Ecology in the National Oceanography Centre, Southampton at the University of Southampton, U.K.

He works in the field of animal ecology researching movements, behaviour and conservation of sharks. Research has estimated global spatial overlap of sharks and fisheries, climate change impacts on fishes, identified common patterns of behaviour (scaling laws) across phyla and informed conservation of threatened species.

== Background ==
He gained a PhD in animal behaviour in 1994 under the supervision of Quentin Bone FRS at the Marine Biological Association. Between 1994 and 1995 Sims did postdoctoral research on physiology of fish behaviour with Paul L.R. Andrews and J. Z. Young FRS after which he was lecturer in marine biology at the University of Plymouth. Between 1998 and 2000 he was lecturer in the Zoology Department at the University of Aberdeen before becoming a Research Fellow at the Marine Biological Association Laboratory in Plymouth in 2000.

He was made Senior Research Fellow at the Marine Biological Association in 2005, became a professor in 2008, and in 2012 was appointed jointly as professor at the University of Southampton.

== Awards ==
- 2001 The Times-Novartis-Royal Institution of Great Britain "Scientist of the New Century" Award
- 2001 Honorary Life Membership of the Royal Institution of Great Britain
- 2007 FSBI Medal of the Fisheries Society of the British Isles for "exceptional advances in the study of fish biology and/or fisheries science"
- 2008 Stanley Gray Silver Medal of the Institute of Marine Engineering, Science and Technology
- 2016 Elected Member of Academia Europaea, the Academy of Europe.
- 2019 Zoological Society of London Marsh Award for Marine and Freshwater Conservation "for fundamental research which has had significant impact on marine and freshwater conservation".

Sims is also a recipient of an advanced grant from the European Research Council.

== Research ==
David Sims is known for research on the behaviour, ecology and conservation of sharks studied using remote tracking technology (telemetry), for studying climate change impacts on fishes, and for making advances in the field of animal movement ecology.

=== Basking shark conservation ===
Beginning in 1995 Sims studied the behavioural ecology of the plankton-feeding basking shark, the world's second largest fish. He showed from long-term field studies of behaviour and satellite tracking that basking sharks feed on specific assemblages of zooplankton and do not hibernate in winter, overturning an understanding which had stood for nearly 50 years. Sims' satellite tracking of basking sharks were some of the first long-term trackings of any shark species and contributed directly to successful conservation proposals to list basking sharks on Appendix II of the Convention for International Trade in Endangered Species (CITES) (Feb 2003) and the Convention for the Conservation of Migratory Species of Wild Animals (CMS) (Nov 2005).

Basking sharks were also studied to find out how fish respond to variations in zooplankton prey density gradients in the ocean, showing basking sharks were useful as 'biological plankton recorders', results which were published in the journal Nature. Results have demonstrated the biological significance of ocean fronts to predators, which have potential as candidates for high-seas protected areas.

=== Climate change impacts on fishes ===
Since 2001, Sims has also made significant contributions to understanding of climate change impacts on fish populations, including how climate-driven warming has altered migration timings, dramatic community changes of European marine fish, and vertical habitat compression of sharks due to ocean deoxygenation which can increase vulnerability to longline fishing.

=== Scaling laws of movement ===
Research has identified common scaling laws that describe movement paths and behaviour patterns of marine predators.

It is argued that Sims' work has provided the strongest empirical evidence for the existence of movement patterns that are well approximated by biological Lévy flights and Lévy walks, a special class of random walk that theoretically optimise random searches for sparsely distributed resources. It is said that Sims' work has shifted the debate on biological Lévy walks from whether they exist, to how and why they arise. He also conducted the first empirical field tests of the Lévy flight foraging hypothesis.

In the book Bursts: The Hidden Pattern Behind Everything We Do, the physicist and best-selling author Albert-László Barabási writes: "Yet if a Lévy flight offers the best search strategy, why didn’t natural selection force animals to exploit it? In February 2008 David Sims showed that it did, in fact."

Sims' 2008 Nature paper announcing the discovery of Scaling laws of marine predator search behaviour is a Web of Science Highly Cited Paper. Since then additional evidence for biological Lévy walks has accumulated across a wide range of taxa including microbes and humans and in fossil trails of extinct invertebrates, suggesting an ancient origin of the movement pattern. His work contributes to the emerging understanding in animal movement ecology that normal diffusion is insufficient for describing natural movements such as searching behaviour but that anomalous diffusion is also needed.

His studies published in Nature on Lévy and Brownian searches in ocean predators inspired the optimal-foraging decision process used in an optimisation algorithm – the "Marine Predators Algorithm" – a high-performance optimizer with applications to engineering, including electrical modeling of photovoltaic power plants and renewable-energy systems design.

=== Spatial overlap of sharks and fisheries ===
In 2016 Sims led an international team tracking ocean-wide movements of sharks. They found pelagic sharks like the shortfin mako aggregate in space-use "hotspots" characterized by fronts and high plankton biomass. Data showed longline fishing vessels also targeted the habitats and efficiently tracked shark movements seasonally, leading to an 80% spatial overlap. The work suggests current hotspots are at risk from overfishing and argued for introduction of international catch limits. The results were reported widely in the media including in The Times newspaper and the journal Science.

=== Global Shark Movement Project ===
He founded the Global Shark Movement Project in 2016, an international collaboration of research groups across 26 countries. The database assembled contains over 2,000 satellite tracks of sharks and is used "to find out where sharks aggregate, how distributions are influenced by environmental variations, and the global overlap with anthropogenic threats such as fisheries".

In 2019 the team published its first results in Nature reporting a global spatial risk assessment of sharks. They showed nearly one quarter of shark space-use hotspots overlap with longline fisheries each month, rising to over 60% each month for commercially valuable sharks (like shortfin mako) and internationally protected species (like great white shark). Shark hotspots were also associated with significant increases in fishing effort, leading the team to conclude that pelagic sharks have limited spatial refuge from current levels of fishing effort in marine areas beyond national jurisdictions (the high seas). They suggest large-scale marine reserves centred on shark hotspots could help to limit shark exploitation on the high seas. The paper was reported worldwide including by the BBC, CNN and NPR.

It has been commented that the paper has "provided a much-needed blueprint for conservation actions that could be used to provide sharks with safe havens in our increasingly crowded oceans".

== Science and media ==
Sims' research on basking shark behaviour was the subject of an award-winning documentary, "Email from a shark", by the Cornish film company Shark Bay Films, that aired on Sky in December 2004. The film won the British Council Youth and Science Award at the Helsingborg Film Festival, Sweden, in 2004. Sims' research has received media attention, including articles in New Scientist, Science, Science News, Physics World, and in documentaries programmes for BBC Television, such as BBC1 "Animal Camera" with Steve Leonard (10 March 2004), BBC Radio 4 Natural History Programme, Channel 5 "Nick Baker's Weird Creatures" episode 5 – the basking shark (16 February 2007), and BBC Radio 4 Inside Science (25 July 2019) presented by Adam Rutherford.
