= Steven J. Cooke =

Canadian biologist

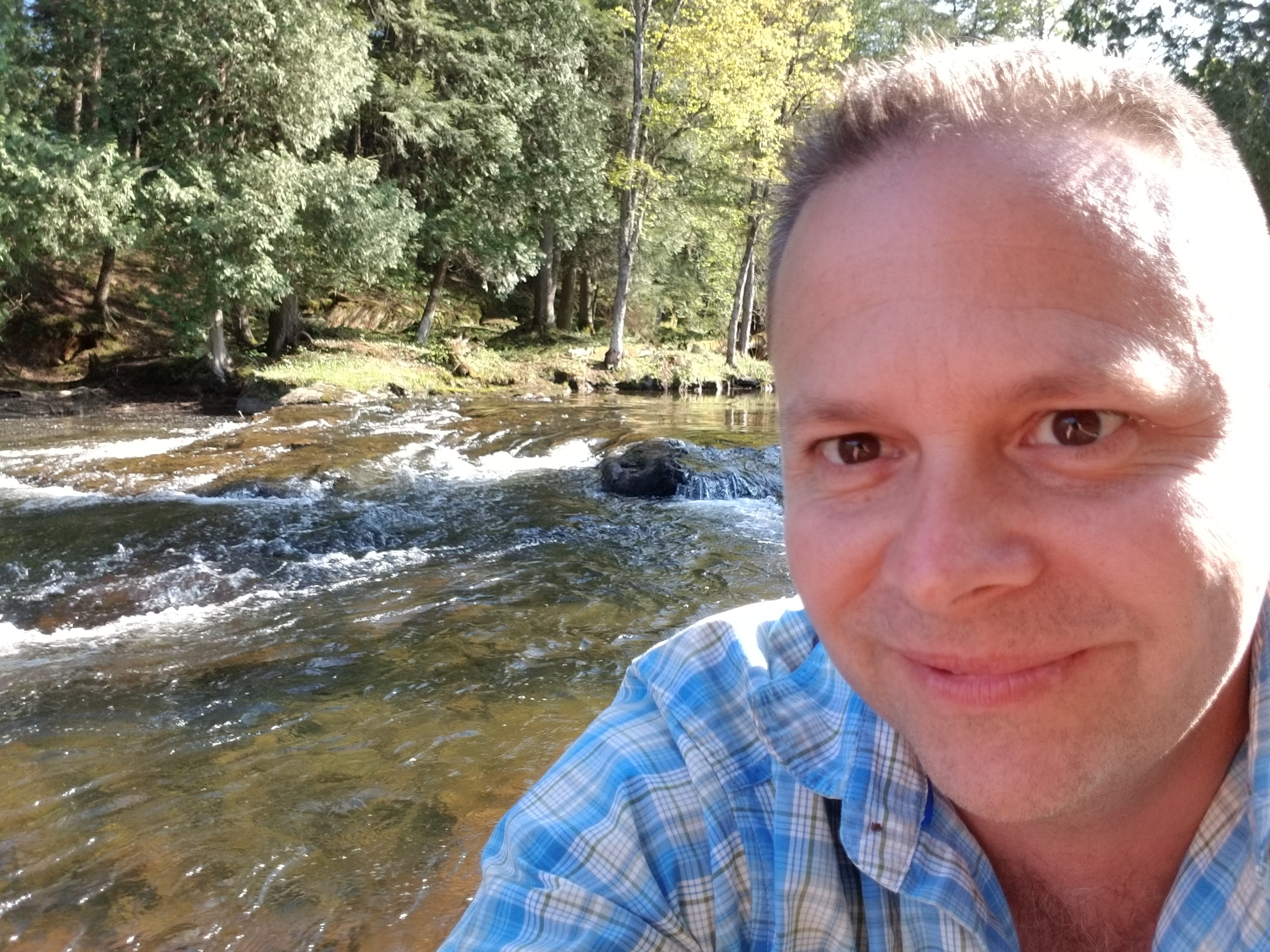
- Born: Kitchener, Ontario, Canada
- Education: University of Waterloo, University of Illinois at Urbana-Champaign, University of British Columbia
- Known for: Fish Ecology, Conservation Physiology, Behavioural Ecology, Environmental Management
- Website: fecpl.ca

Steven J. Cooke is a Canadian biologist specializing in ecology and conservation physiology of fish. He is best known for his integrative work on fish physiology, behaviour, ecology, and human-dimensions to understand and solve complex environmental problems. He currently is a Canada Research Professor in Environmental Science and Biology at Carleton University. He serves as a Canadian Commissioner for the Great Lakes Fishery Commission and as the Editor-in-Chief of the American Fisheries Society magazine Fisheries, Senior Editor of the Collaboration for Environmental Evidence journal Environmental Evidence, and Emeritus Editor and Strategic Advisor for the journal Conservation Physiology.

== Education ==
Cooke started his postsecondary education at the University of Waterloo in Ontario, Canada (1993-1999) where he attained a Bachelor of Environmental Studies and a master's in biology. Cooke completed his doctorate at the University of Illinois at Urbana-Champaign (1999-2002) with David Philipp and David Wahl where he studied the physiological diversity of sunfish in the Department of Natural Resources and Environmental Sciences.

== Career ==
Following his Ph.D., Dr. Cooke accepted a post-doctoral position (with support from NSERC and the Killam Trust) with the Centre for Applied Conservation Research at the University of British Columbia (2002-2005) where he studied the migration biology of sockeye salmon with Dr. Scott Hinch and Dr. Tony Farrell. He joined the professoriate in 2005 and now is a Full Professor of Environmental Science and Biology at Carleton University. He is also the Canada Research Chair in Fish Ecology and Conservation Physiology. His Carleton research lab consists of approximately 30 members, including undergraduate and graduate students and post docs, and he teaches specialized courses in aquatic biology and ecology. He has launched the careers of several prominent biologists, including Forbes 30 Under 30 Winner in Science Dr. Austin Gallagher, who was a postdoctoral fellow in his lab at the time. He serves as an adjunct professor in the Department of Forest and Conservation Science at the University of British Columbia, an adjunct professor in the Biology Department at the University of Waterloo, an affiliate at the Illinois Natural History Survey and is a Special Graduate Faculty at the University of Illinois at Urbana-Champaign. In 2014 he was appointed as Director of the Institute of Environmental Science at Carleton University which became the Institute of Environmental and Interdisciplinary Science in July 2018. Cooke held a Tier II Canada Research Chair from 2009 to 2019.

In addition to his academic activities, Dr. Cooke is the Editor-in-Chief of the Oxford University Press’s journal Conservation Physiology Oxford Journals | Life Sciences | Conservation Physiology on behalf of the Society for Experimental Biology. He also serves on the editorial boards for FACETS, Environmental Reviews, Socio-Ecological Practice Research, and Environmental Biology of Fishes. In 2009 he published and edited a book (with Dr. David Philipp) on the biology and management of centrarchid fishes titled Centrarchid Fishes: Diversity, Biology and Conservation. He was the president of the Canadian Aquatic Resources Section of the American Fisheries Society from 2011-2013 and served as the Chair of the Sea Lamprey Research Board of the Great Lakes Fishery Commission from 2013-2023 before becoming Chair of their Board of Technical Experts in 2023. He is Past President of the International Section of the American Fisheries Society (served as president from 2017-2018) and Past President of the Society for Canadian Aquatic Sciences (served as president from 2023-2024), a society he helped found. He was previously involved in leadership roles with NSERC HydroNet and Ocean Tracking Network. In 2013 he delivered a TEDx talk on the future of recreational fishing. He is a Science Ambassador and Board Chair for KeepFishWet Fishing. Cooke launched the Canadian Centre for Evidence-Based Conservation and Environmental Management in 2014 - an affiliate of the UK-based Collaboration for Environmental Evidence. In 2014 Cooke conceived and launched the "Legends in Canadian Fisheries Science and Management" initiative to recognize luminaries in Canadian fisheries through the Canadian Aquatic Resources Section of the American Fisheries Society. As of February 2026, Dr. Cooke has published over 1200 peer-reviewed scientific papers.

== Notable awards and honours ==
In 2005, Cooke received the Award of Excellence from the Fisheries Management Section of the American Fisheries Society (AFS) jointly with Drs. Scott Hinch, Tony Farrell and Mike Healey. In 2008 he received the FSBI Medal from the Fisheries Society of the British Isles. In 2009 he jointly won the Distinguished Service Award from AFS. In 2013, he was selected as the J.C. Stevenson Lecturer for the Canadian Conference for Fisheries Research and the same year received the Roderick Haig-Brown Award from the Canadian Wildlife Federation. In 2015, Cooke was named an NSERC E.W.R. Steacie Memorial Fellow. Cooke is also a "Research Fellow" for Bonefish and Tarpon Trust. In 2015 Cooke was elected into the Royal Society of Canada's College of New Scholars, Artists, and Scientists and served as the Secretary and member of the RSC's Council (2017-2019) and was subsequently elected as a Fellow in 2022. In 2017 Cooke became a Fellow of the Royal Canadian Geographical Society and in 2018 he was elected as a Fellow of the American Fisheries Society. In 2018 he was named the TD Walter Bean Visiting Professor in the Environment at the University of Waterloo. In 2019 he was named the Robin Welcomme Fellow in Inland Fisheries at Michigan State University. In 2002-2024 Cooke was a Distinguished Presidential Scholar with the Chinese Academy of Science and during his sabbatical in 2024/2025 was a visiting scholar in the Zoology Department at Cambridge University. Cooke was elected as a Fellow of the Royal Society of Canada in 2022. In 2021 he received the Marsh Award for Marine and Freshwater Conservation from the Zoological Society of London and in 2024 received the Conservation Award from the International Game Fish Association.

== Research contributions ==
Cooke's research has contributed to many aspects of the biology, conservation and management of fish and aquatic ecosystems. One area of focus includes reproduction and fitness physiology primarily using centrarchid fish. For example, his research revealed that parental care of centrarchid fishes is energetically and physiologically demanding. Often, Cooke uses novel technology, like EMG transmitters and telemetry techniques to understand the behavior of and physiology of free-living animals. Recently he provided a framework for the application of telemetry techniques to enable IUCN Red List ranking. Cooke uses interdisciplinary approaches (ranging from behaviour to genomics) to study complex conservation and management problems. In particular, he has conducted basic research in support of applied problems for Pacific salmon in British Columbia. For example, his research has revealed that unsuccessful upriver adult migrants tend to be characterized by advanced reproductive development, disease, and stress, relative to those salmon that reach spawning grounds and reproduce. This type of information has been used to influence fisheries policy in Canada including the refinement of a management adjustment models for harvest levels of salmon. Cooke has also been a leader in defining the emerging discipline of “conservation physiology” by developing physiological techniques that enable rapid assessment of causes of conservation problems and consequences of conservation actions. He has recently extended these ideas to the field of ecological restoration. Understanding physiology can help conservation biologists provide legislators, courts and conservation managers with the mechanisms underlying conservation problems. Cooke’s research in the domain of fisheries science focuses on sustainable fisheries which includes quantifying the consequences of fishing on fish and fisheries and developing and promoting strategies that reduce stress and increase survival through refinement of catch-and-release fishing practices. His expertise were used to co-authored the UN FAO technical guidelines for recreational fisheries in 2012. Cooke’s research has illuminated problems in recreational fishing and possible development of effective countermeasures to conserve fisheries and his work has helped to refine management strategies in Canada and the USA. Cooke has also been involved in efforts to raise the profile of the threats facing freshwater fish and freshwater biodiversity more broadly. He reflects on his successes and failures in generating management- and policy-relevant science in a reflective essay.
