= JFB =

JFB may refer to:

- Jamaica Fire Brigade
- Jewish Women's Association (Germany) (German: Jüdischer Frauenbund)
- Journal of Fish Biology
- Henry M. Jackson Federal Building
- JFB, winner of the DMC World DJ Championships in 2021
