= John Reynolds (ecologist) =

Canadian ecologist

- Born: 1959 (age 66–67); St. Thomas, Ontario, Canada
- Education: University of Toronto (PhD); Queen's University (MSc); University of Toronto (BSc)
- Known for: research on salmon in the Great Bear Rainforest, and on extinction risk in marine fishes.
- Awards: Fisheries Society of the British Isles Medal (2000)
- Scientific career
- Fields: Ecology, conservation biology, fisheries,
- Workplaces: Simon Fraser University

John Reynolds is a Canadian ecologist and holder of the Tom Buell BC Leadership Chair in Salmon Conservation and Management at Simon Fraser University. He is a specialist in fish ecology and conservation, particularly Pacific salmon in the Great Bear Rainforest, as well on extinction risk in marine fishes. He is Co-Chair of marine fish committee of the COSEWIC (Committee on the Status of Endangered Wildlife in Canada).

== Biography ==
Reynolds was born in St. Thomas, Ontario, Canada in 1959. During his childhood he was fascinated by natural history and planned to be a biologist. As an undergraduate at the University of Toronto, he was inspired by Jim Rising and Richard Knapton to study evolutionary ecology. After finishing BSc in 1982, he did a MSc at Queen's University with Fred Cooke and completed his PhD in 1991 at the University of Toronto. For the doctorate, he researched sexual selection of Trinidadian guppies under supervision of Mart Gross first at Simon Fraser University and later at the University of Toronto. For Postdoctoral study, he moved to the University of Oxford in 1990 with a NSERC Postdoctoral Fellowship. His second Post-doctorate was at McGill University in 1993 with Bellairs Research Institute Fellowship. His first faculty position was in 1993 at the University of East Anglia, Norwich where he worked for about twelve years. In 2005 he returned to Canada to take up the Tom Buell BC Leadership Chair at Simon Fraser University.

== Career ==
His lab conducts large-scale field studies of Pacific salmon and their ecosystem in the Great Bear Rainforest of British Columbia to understand population declines and recovery process of salmon. They are also studying impacts of nutrients from salmon on adjacent terrestrial plant and animal communities. Their studies have shown strong impacts of nutrients derived from salmon on both plants and birds. On the west-coast of Canada, impacts of aquaculture on wild salmon is a big issue and his lab is studying interactions between farmed and wild salmon through transfer of sealice. Reynolds lab is also involved in research on extinction risk of fishes. They are testing hypothesis for the biological bases of vulnerability, on the basis of life histories and behavior. Current research lines of his lab include: conservation ecology of wild salmon and their ecosystem, impacts of nutrients from seaweed on plants and birds on oceanic islands, biology of extinction risk in marine fishes and impacts of climate change on fishes.

Reynolds has been a member many working groups, national and international organizations, forums and committees. Currently, he is Co-Chair of marine fish committee of the COSEWIC (Committee on the Status of Endangered Wildlife in Canada), member of NSERC (Natural Sciences and Engineering Research Council of Canada) - Evolution and Ecology Evaluation Panel, and fellow of Pacific Wildlife Foundation. Previously, he has worked for many others, such as Cohen Commission of Enquiry (Peer Review Panel, 2010-2011), Vancouver Aquarium (Board of Directors and Conservation and Research Committee, 2009-2011), Fraser River Sturgeon Conservation Society (Board of Directors & Science Committee, 2007-2011), Think Tank on Fraser River Sockeye Salmon (Co-Chair, 2010), Climate Change Advisory Network, UK Royal Society (2006-2009), BC Pacific Salmon Forum (Science Advisory Committee, 2006-2009), IUCN/Ocean Conservancy Marine Conservation Project (Steering Group, 2003), Royal Society Working Group on Measuring Biodiversity for Conservation (2002-2003), IUCN/SSC Shark Specialist Group (2002-2005), IUCN Red List Committee (Advisory Panel, 1998-1999).

Reynolds has received the J.C. Stevenson Award and Lecture – Canadian Conference for Fisheries Research (CCFR) (2003) and the FSBI Medal of the Fisheries Society of the British Isles (2000). He was the 2013 Elizabeth R. Laird Lecturer at the Memorial University of Newfoundland.

== Publications ==
His most cited journal article is "Climate change and distribution shifts in marine fishes" published in Science in 2005, which has been referred to 1,133 times according to Google Scholar.

- He has co-authored the book Marine Fisheries Ecology (Blackwell Science) with Simon Jennings and Michel J. Kaiser. (The book has been cited 616 times according to Google Scholar)
- He has edited 4 books: Conservation of Exploited Species (Cambridge University Press), Handbook of Fish Biology and Fisheries: Volume 1, Fish Biology (Blackwell Publishing), Handbook of Fish Biology and Fisheries: Volume 2, Fisheries (Blackwell Publishing) and Coral Reef Conservation (Cambridge University Press).
