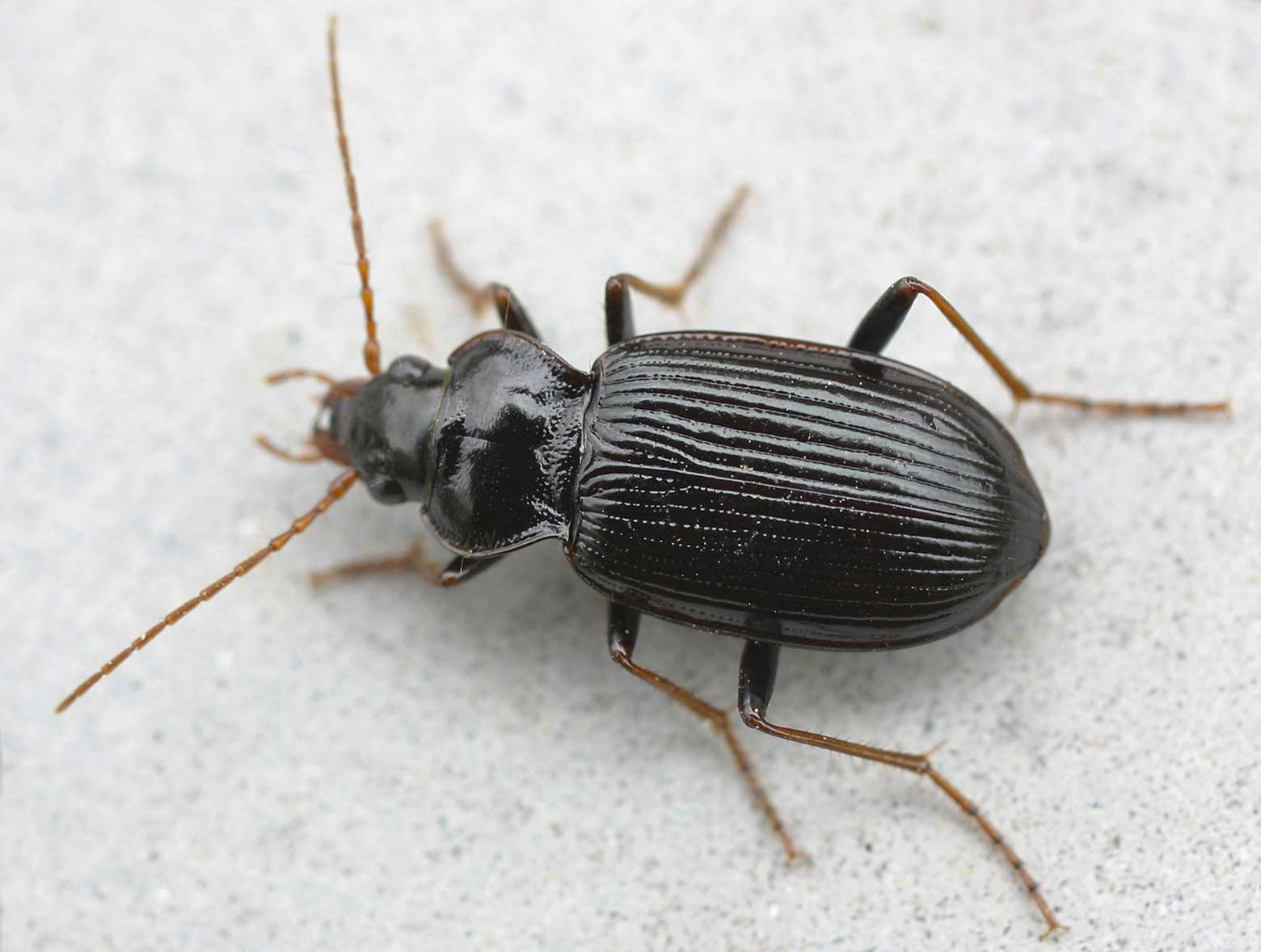

Scientific classification
- Kingdom: Animalia
- Phylum: Arthropoda
- Clade: Pancrustacea
- Class: Insecta
- Order: Coleoptera
- Suborder: Adephaga
- Family: Carabidae
- Genus: Nebria
- Species: N. brevicollis

Binomial name
- Nebria brevicollis (Fabricius, 1792)

Synonyms
- Carabus brevicollis Fabricius, 1792; Nebria uzokensis Obenberger, 1917; Nebria sicula Preudhomme de Borre & Ragusa, 1882; Nebria cursor Bedel, 1879; Nebria rufipes Dalla Torre, 1877; Nebria barbara Chaudoir, 1843; Nebria lata Newman, 1833; Nebria varicornis Newman, 1833; Nebria tamsii Dejean, 1831; Nebria elongata Fischer von Waldheim, 1828; Nebria rufomarginata Fischer von Waldheim, 1828; Nebria fuscata Bonelli, 1810; Nebria rugimarginata Marsham, 1802; Carabus infidus P.Rossi, 1792; Carabus rufipes Goeze, 1777; Carabus cursor O.F.Müller, 1776

= Nebria brevicollis =

Species of beetle

Nebria brevicollis, the short-collared gazelle beetle, belonging to the Carabidae family, is a ground beetle. With nearly 500 species and over 100 subspecies, Nebria is the most diverse genus within the Nebriini tribe of ground beetles. Members of the genus occupy a wide range of habitats. Nebria brevicollis is native to Europe and the Near East but has been introduced to the western United States and Canada. Its rapid expansion in North America is characteristic of an invasive species. Due to the variation in habitat, their diet consists of small arthropods (less than 4 mm in length) including Collembola, Diptera, earthworms, mites, and spiders.

== Description ==
Nebria brevicollis has a dark brown body with reddish-brown tibiae, tarsi, palpi, and antennae. The pronotum features two lateral setae on each side and is densely punctuate across its base.

This species is most abundant between October and December, then from January through mid-May. It is of modest size, ranging in length from 10–14 mm. It has two sets of wings, protected by a hard shell that is black or dark brown. Only a few beetles have functional flight muscles. No sexual dimorphism has been observed between males and females. They are active at night.

== Distribution and habitat ==
These beetles are plentiful across the globe. In Europe, it is found in nearly all countries and islands.

In 2008, it was reported as introduced in western Oregon, United States, where it has been found in highly disturbed sites as well as in native old-growth forest stands. It has also now been found in Washington state and northern California, as well as in southern British Columbia, Canada. The rapid expansion of Nebria brevicollis in North America has caused researchers to question whether it meets the criteria of an invasive species. The rate of detection, and the rapid range expansion into Oregon, are characteristics of an invasive species. In addition, its presence has been documented extensively from Europe to North America and in diverse harsh environments from sea beaches to alpine caves. The ecological range these beetles exhibit is unrivaled by any other carabid species in Oregon.

The primary habitat is the cover of shaded leaf litter in deciduous forests; however, it can also be found in disturbed habitat such as parks, gardens, and agricultural lands. In North America, it has been found in the summits, forest and meadows of mountains (at over 1200 meters elevation). Unlike other members of Nebria, this species avoids moist areas.

== Food resources ==
Nebria brevicollis is an opportunistic predator. It is also an omnivore and feeds at night. N. brevicollis has been known to feed on Mollusca, earthworms, and small insects. N. brevicollis has also been found to eat other types of beetles in both their larval and imaginal stages of their life cycle. Additionally, N. brevicollis has been documented to eat different species of small flies, spiders, mites and earthworms. It has also been observed that the total body length is an important constraint in choosing a food source. Most of the beetles prey is less than 4 mm in length. Competition for food between Nebria brevicollis and Pterostichus algidus has been hypothesized. Foraging behavior includes walking up and down grass stalks and wandering over lupine leaves. Given their ability to forage both horizontally and vertically across space, they expand their prey resource pool.

== Life history ==
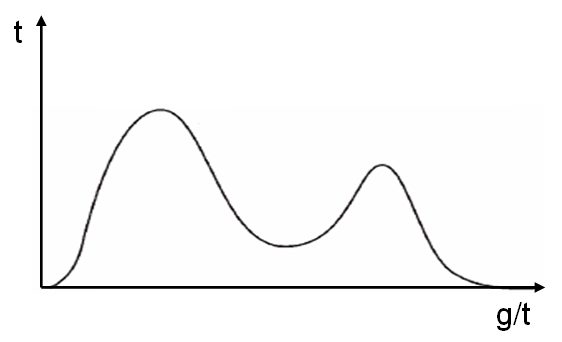
Bimodal distribution representing the breeding patterns or Nebria brevicollis

Nebria brevicollishas can be found throughout the year; however, it is the most active during the months of June, July, and August. N. brevicollis undergo an intense feeding period, after which they enter diapause. The beetle then emerges for mating in the fall months. During the winter, the larvae of N. brevicollis are active and are seen late in the winter to early spring.

Breeding is influenced by the quantity and quality of the food available. Egg production is influenced by the size of the beetle and diminishing food quantity prolongs the development of the larvae. To rear the fittest offspring, it will avoid conditions of low food supply by following a bimodal breeding curve. It will engage in inactive periods, lasting five to six weeks, prior to a female laying her eggs. The breeding life of females is 27 days. Most eggs take 17 days to hatch.

Research regarding the aggregation behavior of Harmonia axyridis, belonging to the same order as N. brevicollis, has demonstrated this social behavior to be advantageous in group living conditions. It can allow for interactivity between individuals, which can allow for further information transfer. Costs, such as increased competition for food, space, and reproduction, may be a consequence of aggregative behavior; however, the advantages associated with group living outweigh the costs for H. axyridis and likewise other beetles.

Following diapause, the breeding season begins. Various theories have been brought forth concerning the diapause in N. brevicollis. It may allow beetles to avoid conditions of low food supply during the summer. Conditions of low food supply can negatively influence both the number of eggs produced and the viability of the eggs.

Low feeding levels produce small beetles and thus unfavorable conditions during larval development. Secondly, it is hypothesized that diapause allows for the development of the gonads. Fat reserves are depleted for gonad maturation.

== Physiology ==
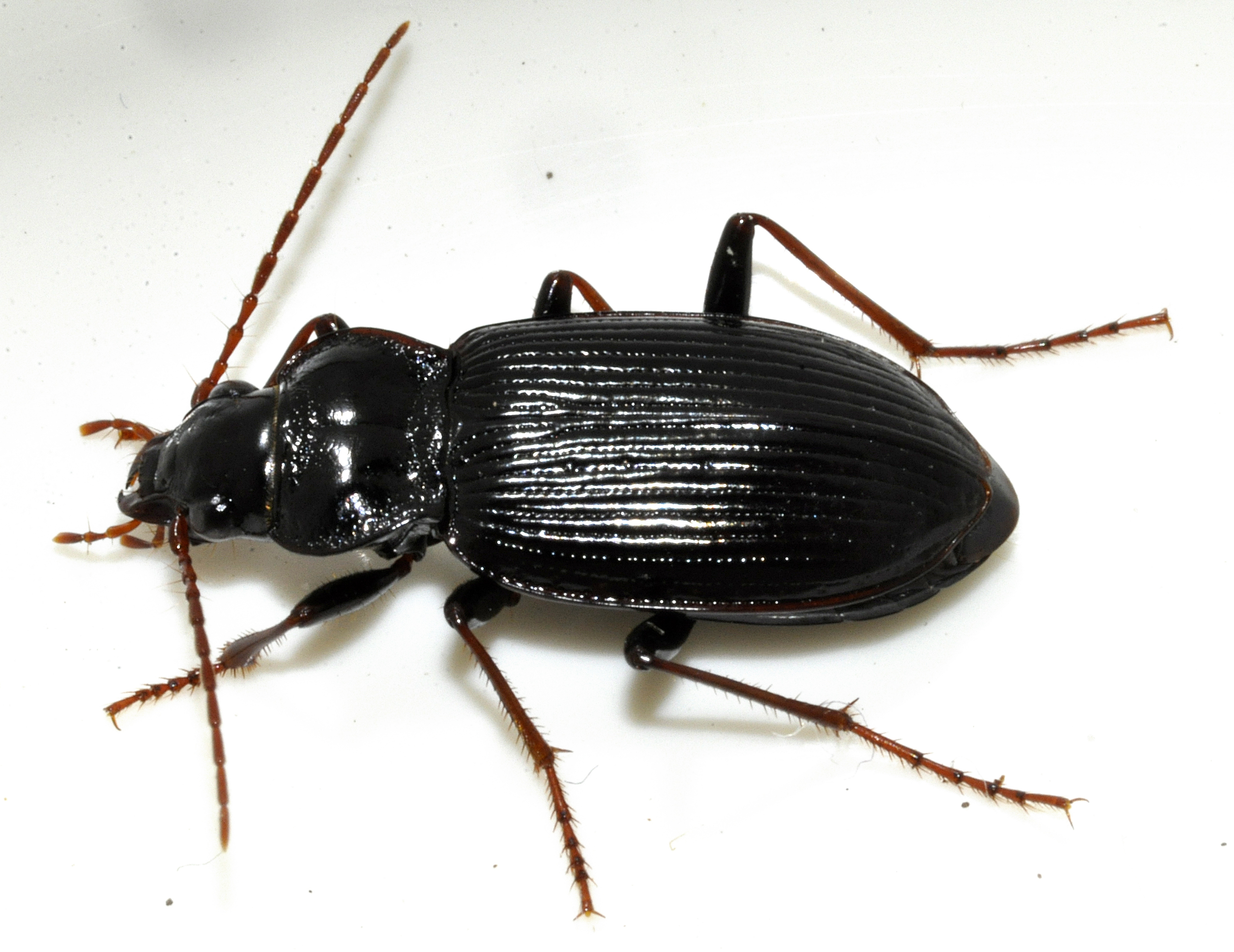
Long and large wings protected by the strong exoskeleton of N. brevicollis

=== Flight ===
Despite possessing large wings, Nebria brevicollis has limited flight potential, consistent with many other ground beetles. While all beetles have flight muscles that work antagonistically – when one shortens, the other stretches – only a small percentage are functional. In addition, the beetles with flight potential have a short flight period. The arrested development of the flight muscles, causing the inability to fly, may be an evolutionary choice. Rather than investing energy into the building of flight muscles, these beetles use their energy for the metabolic costs of larval growth.

Dispersers are individuals that are characterized by their ability to fly as a result of having functional flight muscles. Within the N. brevicollis species, dispersers have been observed to form under favorable laboratory condition. Beetles that were fed in excess and kept at an ideal temperature, always emerged with flight muscles. The development of flight muscles took three weeks.

All beetles hatch with flight muscles. Whether the muscles become arrested or not depends on the amount of food available during larval development. Crowding, lack of food, and low temperatures will not produce dispersers. Physiologically, the breaking down of the flight muscles creates more room for the ovaries and the eggs within the abdomen of the beetle.

== Genetics ==
In a study published in 2012, researchers Ikeda, Nishikawa, and Sorta found evidence that the loss of flight within a species promotes beetle diversification. Using carrion beetles from the family Silphidae, researchers demonstrated higher genetic differentiation in flightless beetle species compared to flight-capable species. Flight ability can facilitate better mating and access to resources. However, the walking ability of N. brevicollis is high and does allow for the colonization of new habitats and exchange between local populations. There is an energetic cost associated with the maintaining of the flight muscles. The evolutionary loss of flight muscles has allowed for beetles to invest energy into other organs, such as those essential for survival and reproduction.

Within flightless species, researchers showed higher genetic differentiation compared to flight-capable species – a result of restricted gene flow between species. They further observed speciation rate within flightless populations to be higher than that of flight-capable ones. Thus, a higher number of genetically distinct lineages can be observed within flightless species. Flightless species is a common pattern among the different families of Coleoptera with Nebria brevicollis likely choosing to use its energy towards larval growth rather than the building of flight muscles.

== Associative learning ==
Studies have demonstrated associative learning in N. brevicollis, suggesting cognitive abilities that may increase fitness. The genotype, the physical and social environment, as well as the animal personality, influence one's interactions with the environment. Natural selection may act upon associative learning and personality traits, including boldness, aggressiveness, sociability, and exploratory tendencies.

In 2012, researchers Sih and Del Guidice constructed a model for 'fast' individual cognitive styles and 'slow' individual cognitive styles. Higher expressions of a trait are thought to increase an individual's likelihood for reward or allow for more acquisition of the environment while, simultaneously, increasing one's risk at the cost of accuracy. Greater exploratory behavior may be correlated with increased foraging success. 'Slow' cognitive styles individuals make fewer mistakes; however, are slower to acquire reward and knowledge.

Recent studies regarding N. brevicollis have questioned whether variation in personality traits and associative learning ability are related. The grain beetle Tenebrio molitor and the carabid beetle Pterostichus melanarius have been shown to possess learning ability. Due to the wide range of habitat and diet of N. brevicollis, it has been proposed that learning ability may be favored by natural selection within the species. Researchers demonstrated that N. brevicollis exhibit associative learning ability and demonstrated exploratory behavior as a personality trait of these ground-dwellers.

Varying selection pressures within different habitats has been hypothesized as an explanation for the relationship between personality and cognition. Compared to beetles collected from less urbanized areas, those in urban areas show increased exploratory behavior. In laboratory settings, N. brevicollis females exhibited a large variation in associative learning ability. It is likely that associative learning abilities are specific to one beetle's personality rather than across species population.

As an emerging field of interest, researchers plan to conduct further studies in which a wider range of learning assays are tested to understand the cognition-personality relationships of N. brevicollis.

== Breeding and diapause ==
Nebria brevicollis engages in sporadic breeding, with active periods in the early summer followed by diapause, a period of suspended development. When active, they build up their food reserves by feeding rapidly. Triggered by environmental cues, metabolic changes occur and the onset of diapause is brought on. There is no locomotion activity and the animals do not feed. In N. brevicollis, the onset of diapause is regulated by the fat content of the beetle's body. The period of diapause lasts 5 to 6 weeks during the months of July and August. Energy for body maintenance during this time is supplied by the large food reserves accumulated early in the summer. Groups of up to 80 beetles will aggregate together under stones or logs during a period of diapause.

== Predation ==
The abundance of beetles in Oregon may have deleterious effects on other carabid species. It is possible that the increase in prevalence of Nebria brevicollis is causing population declines within other carabid species. Increased competition for food between species may emerge, especially between species with similar diets and breeding practices. However, more research regarding the interactions between N. brevicollis and other carabid taxa must be conducted before concluding that negative impacts have occurred.

=== Predation by N. brevicollis ===
Nebria brevicollis's predation of non-carabid species may also have deleterious effects. The Fender's blue butterfly is considered to be endangered. During the beetle's diapause, the butterflies are at increased risk of predation by N. brevicollis. Both species share similar habitats, as the occurrence of N. brevicollis has been found at sites where the butterflies exist.

N. brevicollis has also been documented to kill, consume, and scavenge the slug Deroceras reticulatum. Also known as the gray field slug, it is found in the Pacific Northwest and worldwide. N. brevicollis killed more injured individuals than healthy individuals. However, there was a stronger preference in scavenging for dead slugs than those that were alive. Slugs produce mucus as a defense mechanism at the onset of a beetle attack. However, deceased slugs no longer produce mucus. They are therefore a more suitable prey, as they require a reduced handling time and a decreased energy investment.

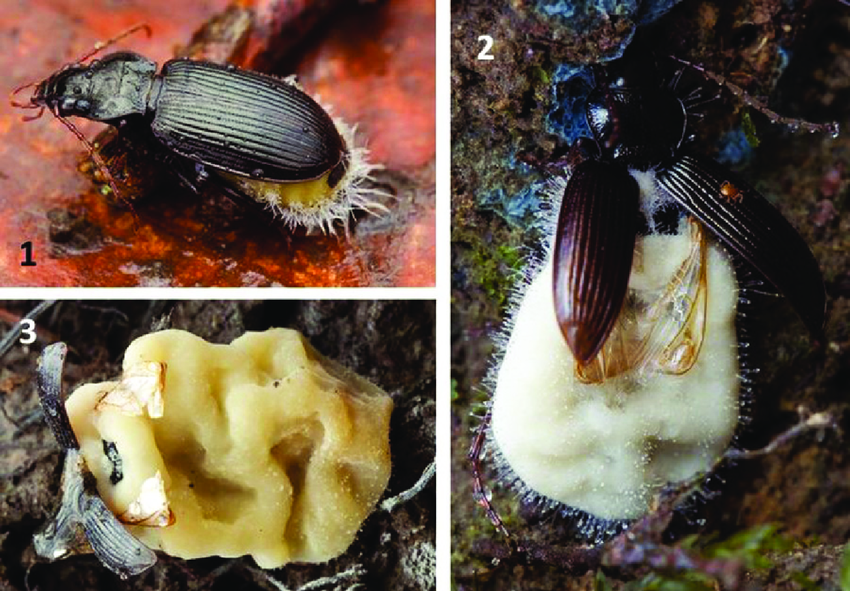
Nebria brevicollis at various stages of infection by Erynia nebriae

=== Predation of N. brevicollis ===
In north-western Germany, it was observed by researchers that an entomopathogenic fungus, Erynia nebriae was preying upon N. brevicollis . Although Nebria brevicollis is widely considered to be solely carnivorous, multiple small studies have proven that Nebria brevicollis will resort to eating various types of fungi that can be found in the soil they live on/around. The fungus then infects the beetle, which results in a swollen abdomen. Observation concluded that low temperatures neither killed nor impeded the epizootic of the fungus. While more research regarding the relationship between fungus and beetle must be conducted, it is possible that the fungus manipulates the behavior of the beetle to their advantage. However, the strong exoskeleton of most carabid species may serve as a defense mechanism against fungi predation.

== Use as a bioindicator ==
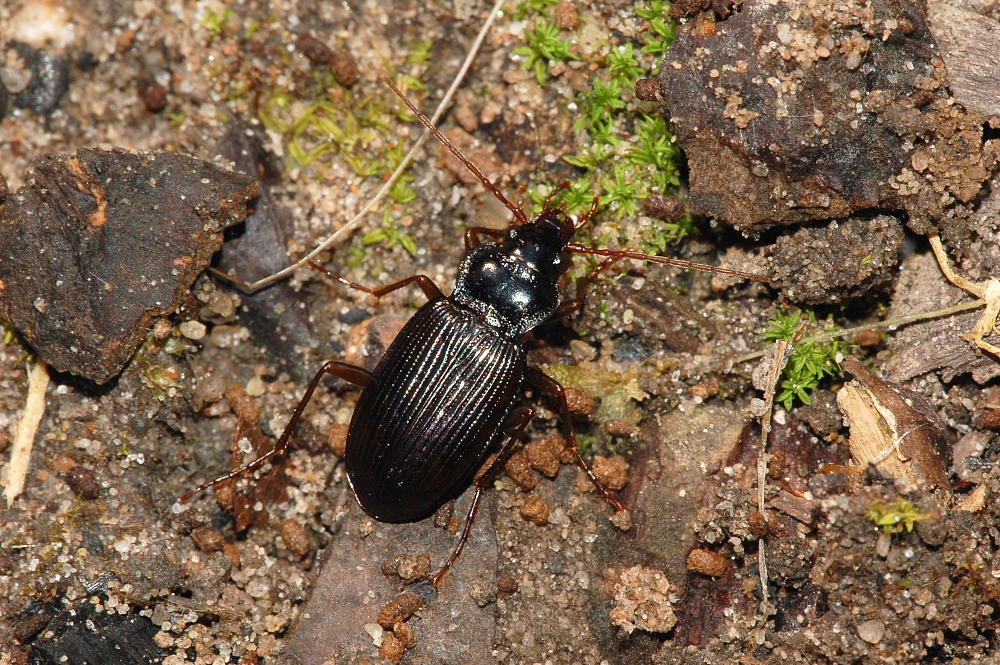
Composition of the soil on which Nebria brevicollis walks

Ground beetles like Nebria brevicollis serve as effective bioindicators for studying environmental impacts of human activities. Alterations in habitat due to urbanization, pollution, and harmful land management practices can be studied through changes in ground beetle communities. Possible effects environmental pollution may have on the habitat of the beetles includes changing soil pH, as well as altering its sodium and calcium content. Physiologically, pollution has been observed to cause physiological and behavioral changes. Research has confirmed the property of the soil can shape carabid communities, including Nebria brevicollis. Changes in species number or abundance can be correlated with habitat alterations caused by humans. Changes in the reproductive ability of ground-dwelling beetles may also serve to highlight the negative consequences of environmental pollution. More research must be conducted to solidify these correlations.
