= David Philipp =

David Philipp may refer to:

- David Philipp (biologist), American biologist
- David Philipp (footballer), German footballer

== See also ==
- David Philip, Scottish footballer
- David Butt Philip, British operatic tenor
