= Secretary bird optimization algorithm =

Secretary bird-inspired optimizer

Secretary bird optimization algorithm (SBOA) is a metaheuristic optimization algorithm introduced in 2024. It is a population-based method inspired by the hunting and predator-evasion behaviour of the secretarybird (Sagittarius serpentarius). In the published formulation, the search process is divided into two main stages: an exploration phase based on hunting behaviour and an exploitation phase based on escape behaviour.

A 2025 review described SBOA as a recent bio-inspired optimizer and surveyed its variants and application areas.

== Background ==
Metaheuristic optimization algorithms are widely used for solving nonlinear, multimodal, and high-dimensional problems for which exact mathematical optimization methods may be difficult or expensive to apply. SBOA was proposed within the broader family of nature-inspired algorithms and bio-inspired computing methods.

In the original paper, SBOA was presented as a population-based optimizer in which each search agent represents a candidate solution. The algorithm was designed around two broad behavioural themes attributed to secretary birds in nature: hunting prey, especially snakes, and avoiding predators.

== Biological inspiration ==
The secretarybird (Sagittarius serpentarius) is a large terrestrial bird of prey native to sub-Saharan Africa and associated with open grasslands and savannas. It is noted for ground-based hunting, especially against reptiles and other small prey, and for its distinctive kicking and stamping behaviour when attacking prey.

In the SBOA paper, this biological inspiration is mapped to the search process as follows: preparatory behaviour corresponds to initialization, hunting behaviour corresponds to exploration, and predator-evasion behaviour corresponds to exploitation.

== Algorithm overview ==
SBOA is a population-based optimization method. Each secretary bird in the population corresponds to one candidate solution in the search space, and the position of a bird determines the values of the decision variables.

The algorithm begins with a randomly initialized population bounded by lower and upper search limits. Candidate solutions are then iteratively updated through two major stages:

- Exploration phase, modeled on hunting behaviour;
- Exploitation phase, modeled on escape behaviour.

At each iteration, the objective function is evaluated for all candidate solutions, and the current best solution is retained.

== Mathematical model ==
=== Initialization ===
In the original formulation, the position of each search agent is initialized within problem bounds as

$$X_{i,j}=lb_j+r\,(ub_j-lb_j), \qquad i=1,2,\ldots,N,\quad j=1,2,\ldots,\mathrm{Dim}$$

where $lb_j$ and $ub_j$ are the lower and upper bounds of the $j$-th variable, $r$ is a random number in $[0,1]$, $N$ is the population size, and $\mathrm{Dim}$ is the dimension of the problem.

The population matrix is expressed as

$$X=
\begin{bmatrix}
x_{1,1} & x_{1,2} & \cdots & x_{1,\mathrm{Dim}} \\
x_{2,1} & x_{2,2} & \cdots & x_{2,\mathrm{Dim}} \\
\vdots & \vdots & \ddots & \vdots \\
x_{N,1} & x_{N,2} & \cdots & x_{N,\mathrm{Dim}}
\end{bmatrix}$$

and the vector of objective-function values is written as

$$F=
\begin{bmatrix}
F(X_1) \\
F(X_2) \\
\vdots \\
F(X_N)
\end{bmatrix}.$$

=== Exploration phase ===
In the SBOA paper, hunting behaviour is divided into three stages: searching for prey, consuming prey, and attacking prey.

==== Stage 1: Searching for prey ====
The first stage is associated with broad search and is modeled using a differential-update mechanism:

$$x^{\mathrm{new},P1}_{i,j}=x_{i,j}+\left(x_{\mathrm{random\_1}}-x_{\mathrm{random\_2}}\right)\times R_1,
\qquad t<\frac{1}{3}T$$

where $T$ is the maximum number of iterations and $R_1$ is a random vector.

==== Stage 2: Consuming prey ====
The second stage introduces a Brownian-motion-based local search around the best solution found so far:

$$RB=\mathrm{randn}(1,\mathrm{Dim})$$

$$x^{\mathrm{new},P1}_{i,j}=x_{\mathrm{best}}+\exp\!\left(\left(\frac{t}{T}\right)^4\right)(RB-0.5)\,(x_{\mathrm{best}}-x_{i,j}),
\qquad \frac{1}{3}T<t<\frac{2}{3}T$$

where $x_{\mathrm{best}}$ denotes the current best solution.

==== Stage 3: Attacking prey ====
The third stage uses a Lévy flight-based perturbation to improve global search and reduce premature convergence:

$$x^{\mathrm{new},P1}_{i,j}=x_{\mathrm{best}}+\left(1-\frac{t}{T}\right)^{\left(2\frac{t}{T}\right)} x_{i,j}\,RL,
\qquad t>\frac{2}{3}T$$

where

$$RL=0.5\times \mathrm{Levy}(\mathrm{Dim}).$$

=== Exploitation phase ===
The exploitation stage models two predator-evasion strategies: camouflage and escape by running or flying away.

These alternatives are represented as two cases:

$$x^{\mathrm{new},P2}_{i,j}=
\begin{cases}
x_{\mathrm{best}}+(2RB-1)\left(1-\frac{t}{T}\right)^2 x_{i,j}, & \text{if } r<0.5 \\[6pt]
x_{i,j}+R_2\,(x_{\mathrm{random}}-Kx_{i,j}), & \text{otherwise}
\end{cases}$$

where $R_2$ is a normally distributed random vector and $K$ is a randomly selected integer defined by

$$K=\mathrm{round}(1+\mathrm{rand}(1,1)).$$

== Search process ==
The overall SBOA workflow consists of initialization, iterative position updating, fitness evaluation, and retention of the best solution found so far. In the original article, the search process is presented through both a flowchart and pseudocode, with the exploration stage occupying the earlier part of the update cycle and the exploitation stage refining candidate solutions afterward.

== Exploration and exploitation ==
Like many population-based optimizers, SBOA is organized around the balance between exploration and exploitation. In the original article, exploration is associated with broader search over the solution space, while exploitation is associated with local refinement near promising solutions.

The paper also introduced diversity-based expressions for reporting exploration and exploitation percentages during the run of the algorithm.

== Computational complexity ==
The original paper analyzed SBOA using Big O notation. Let $N$ denote the population size, $\mathrm{Dim}$ the number of decision variables, and $T$ the maximum number of iterations. The time complexity of initialization is given as $O(N)$, while the solution-update process is described as $O(T\times N)+O(T\times N\times \mathrm{Dim})$. The total computational complexity is summarized as

$$O\!\left(N\times(T\times \mathrm{Dim}+1)\right).$$

== Applications ==
In the original publication, SBOA was evaluated on benchmark suites including CEC 2017 and CEC 2022, and was also applied to constrained engineering design problems and three-dimensional path planning for unmanned aerial vehicles. Later work and reviews have described additional variants and applications of the method.

SBOA has also been used as an optimizer for training multilayer perceptron models by encoding network weights and biases as candidate solutions and minimizing mean squared error.

== See also ==
- Metaheuristic
- Nature-inspired algorithm
- Swarm intelligence
- Lévy flight
- Differential evolution
- Multilayer perceptron
