= Beverton Medal =

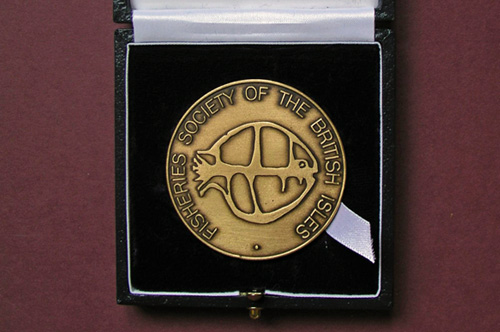
- The Beverton Medal is cast in silver by Spink of London
- Awarded for: “lifelong contribution to all aspects of the study of fish biology and/or fisheries science, with a focus on ground-breaking research”
- Sponsored by: Fisheries Society of the British Isles (FSBI)
- First award: 1995
- Website: www.fsbi.org.uk/information/medals/

The Beverton Medal is a prestigious. international fish biology and/or fisheries science prize awarded annually. It is awarded to a distinguished scientist for a lifelong contribution to all aspects of the study of fish biology and/or fisheries science, with a focus on ground-breaking research. The medal was established as the highest award of the Fisheries Society of the British Isles (FSBI) to recognize distinction in the field of fish biology and fisheries science, to raise the profile of the discipline and of the Society in the wider scientific community. Medals are awarded to individuals who have made an outstanding contribution to fish biology and/or fisheries. The Beverton Medal is traditionally awarded in July at the Fisheries Society of the British Isles annual international conference.

The first medal was awarded to Ray Beverton. In his honour, the medal is now known as the Beverton Medal. In 2017, to mark the 50th anniversary of the Fisheries Society of the British Isles (FSBI) the medal was awarded to Ray's collaborator Sidney Holt, having together written the book On the Dynamics of Exploited Fish Populations in 1957

== Medallists ==
- 2021 - Daniel Pauly
- 2020 - Beth Fulton
- 2019 - Neil B. Metcalfe
- 2018 - Gary Carvahlo
- 2017 - Sidney Holt
- 2016 - Lennart Persson
- 2015 - Ian Cowx
- 2014 - Alexander (Sandy) Scot
- 2013 - Felicity Huntingford
- 2012 - Charles Tyler
- 2011 - Imantes (Monty) Priede
- 2010 - Tony Farrell
- 2009 - Peter Maitland
- 2008 - Paul J.B. Hart
- 2007 - Richard Mann (M.B.E.)
- 2006 - Anne Magurran
- 2005 - J.P. Sumpter
- 2004 - A. Ferguson
- 2003 - Tony J. Pitcher
- 2002 - J.E. Thorpe
- 2001 - H. Bern
- 2000 - Rosemary Lowe-McConnell
- 1999 - J.M. Elliott
- 1998 - J.H.S. Blaxter
- 1997 - E. Houde
- 1996 - E.D. Le Cren
- 1995 - Ray Beverton

== See also ==
- List of biology awards
