= FSBI Medal =

Annual international fisheries science prize

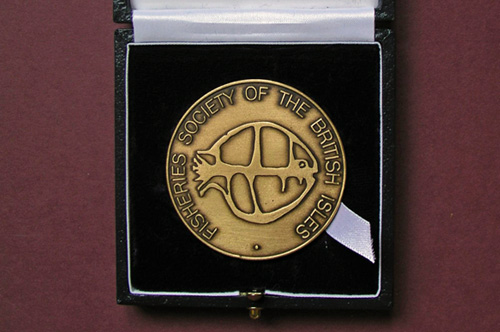
- The FSBI Medal is cast in bronze by Spink of London
- Awarded for: “exceptional advances in the study of fish biology and/or fisheries science”
- Sponsored by: Fisheries Society of the British Isles (FSBI)
- First award: 1999
- Website: www.fsbi.org.uk/information/medals/

The FSBI Medal is an international fish biology and/or fisheries science prize awarded annually for exceptional advances by a scientist in the earlier stages of his or her career. Medallists have made a significant contribution to the field of fish biology through their achievements in scientific research. The medal is only awarded if a candidate of sufficient quality is nominated. The medal was established by the Fisheries Society of the British Isles (FSBI) to recognize distinction in the field of fish biology and fisheries science, and to raise the profile of the discipline and of the Society in the wider scientific community. Medals are awarded to individuals who have made an outstanding contribution to fish biology and/or fisheries. The FSBI Medal is traditionally awarded in July at the Fisheries Society of the British Isles Annual International Conference.

== Medallists ==
Source: FSBI

- 2023 - Rajeev Raghavan
- 2022 - Amy Deacon
- 2021 - Christos Ioannou
- 2020 - Julien Cucherousset
- 2019 - Shaun Killen
- 2018 - Aaron McNeil
- 2017 - Nick Graham
- 2016 - Stephen Simpson
- 2015 - Kathryn Elmer
- 2014 - Darren Croft
- 2013 - Katherine Sloman
- 2012 - Robert Arlinghaus
- 2011 - Ashley Ward
- 2010 - Iain Barber
- 2009 - John Pinnegar
- 2008 - Steven J. Cooke
- 2007 - David W. Sims
- 2006 - Victoria Braithwaite
- 2005 - Jason Link
- 2004 - Michel Kaiser
- 2003 - Jens Krause
- 2002 - Etienne Baras
- 2001 - Simon Jennings
- 2000 - John Reynolds
- 1999 - Neil Metcalfe

== See also ==
- List of biology awards
