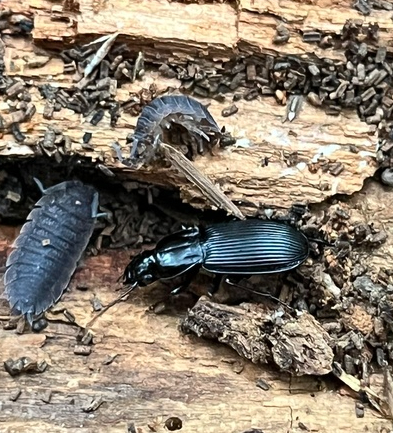

Scientific classification
- Kingdom: Animalia
- Phylum: Arthropoda
- Class: Insecta
- Order: Coleoptera
- Suborder: Adephaga
- Family: Carabidae
- Genus: Pterostichus
- Species: P. algidus

Binomial name
- Pterostichus algidus LeConte, 1853

Synonyms
- Pterostichus bucolicus Casey, 1913; Pterostichus humboldti Casey, 1913; Pterostichus kansanus (Casey, 1918)

= Pterostichus algidus =

Species of beetle

Pterostichus algidus is a species of woodland ground beetle in the family Carabidae. It is found in North America.

== Diet ==
It has been observed that P. algidus is a consumer of Douglas-fir seed in the Pacific Northwest. Furthermore, it has been hypothesized that there is competition for food between P. algidus and another beetle, Nebria brevicollis. The beetle N. brevicollis is of the same order as P. algidus. Given similar preference size for prey, researchers have hypothesized competition between these two species.
