= Conservation Physiology =

- Discipline: Ecology, Physiology, Conservation biology, Biodiversity
- Language: English
- Edited by: Andrea Fuller Steven J. Cooke

Publication details
- History: 2013–present
- Publisher: Oxford University Press
- Open access: Yes
- Impact factor: 3.252 (2021)

Standard abbreviations
- ISO 4: Conserv. Physiol.

Links
- Journal homepage; Online access

Conservation Physiology is an online only, fully open access journal published by Oxford University Press on behalf of the Society for Experimental Biology. It publishes research on all taxa (microbes, plants and animals) focused on understanding and predicting how organisms, populations, ecosystems and natural resources respond to environmental change and stressors. In addition to standard research articles, reviews, tool box (methods) papers and perspective articles, the journal also publishes short and punchy lay summaries of key papers under the banner of Conservation Physiology in Action (CPIA) - see.
