= Ray Beverton =

British fisheries scientist (1922-1995)

Raymond John Heaphy Beverton
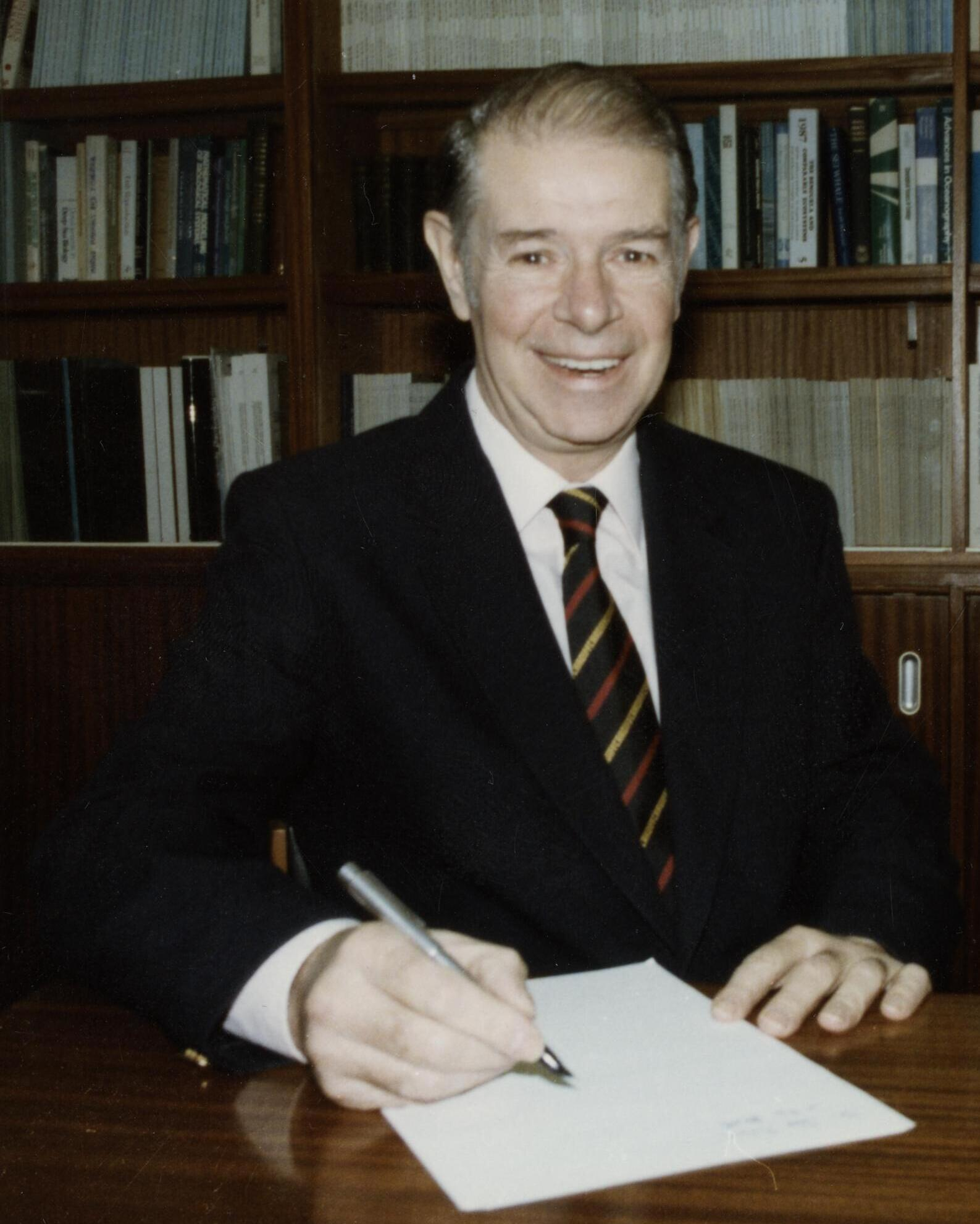
- Born: 29 August 1922
- Died: 23 July 1995 (aged 72)
- Known for: Fisheries science
- Awards: Fellow of the Royal Society, Order of the British Empire

Raymond (Ray) John Heaphy Beverton CBE FRS (29 August 1922 – 23 July 1995) was an important founder of fisheries science. He is best known for the book On the Dynamics of Exploited Fish Populations (1957) which he wrote with Sidney Holt. The book is a cornerstone of modern fisheries science and remains much used today. Beverton's life and achievements are described in detail in several obituaries written by prominent figures in fisheries science.

== Achievements ==
Much of the foundations of quantitative fisheries science were laid out in On the Dynamics of Exploited Fish Populations which Ray Beverton and Sidney Holt wrote at the Fisheries Laboratory, Lowestoft (UK). In his review of the 1993 reprint of the book, Ray Hilborn writes "It is remarkable how the book has stood the test of time and still provides a survey of the important topics in fisheries management". The book has a new reprint from 2004, with a foreword by Sidney Holt.

Beverton was also one of the first to acknowledge the variation of life histories that exists in fish, and the importance of this in fisheries management. This was the topic of the symposium Building on Beverton's legacy: Life history variation and fisheries management, organised in 2003 during the 133rd annual meeting of the American Fisheries Society. The legacy of the 1957 Beverton and Holt treatise is commemorated in the volume Advances in Fisheries Science. 50 years on from Beverton and Holt. The volume includes a foreword by Sidney Holt.

Beverton was the editor of Journal du Conseil, now ICES Journal of Marine Science, from 1983 to 1991. Among many other posts, he was the Deputy Director of the Fisheries Laboratory, Lowestoft. Beverton stayed active until his late years; he was involved in several papers published after his death, the last one nine years afterwards. Outside fisheries science, Beverton is best known for the Beverton–Holt model. In population ecology the model is used as a stand-alone discrete time population model or as a model of density dependence in larger population models. Originally the model had a more specific usage; it was devised to describe the dependence of recruitment on spawning stock biomass.

=== Beverton Medal ===
The Fisheries Society of the British Isles awards each year the Beverton Medal "to a distinguished scientist for a lifelong contribution to all aspects of the study of fish biology and/or fisheries science, with a focus on ground-breaking research." The history of the medal goes back to 1995 when the society decided to award a medal to an individual who had contributed significantly to fisheries biology. Ray Beverton was the first recipient, but he died soon afterwards. The medal was then named in his honour.

=== Awards received ===
- Honorary DSc from the University of Wales (1989).
