= Paul Andrews (scientist) =

British physiologist (born 1953)

Paul L. R. Andrews
- Born: 1953 (age 72–73); Worcester, England
- Education: University of Sheffield
- Occupation: Scientist
- Organizations: St. George's University of London; Stazione Zoologica Anton Dohrn
- Awards: Pfizer Academic Award

Paul L. R. Andrews (born 1953) is a British physiologist whose basic research on the mechanisms of action and efficacy of antiemetic substances contributed to development of treatments for anti-cancer chemotherapy-induced nausea and vomiting.

He also conducted research on the comparative neurophysiology of fish and octopus, partly undertaken in collaboration with J. Z. Young.

He received the Pfizer Academic Award in 1989 for "studies which have furthered our understanding of the nervous control of gut function".

== Career ==
Andrews was educated at the University of Sheffield where he obtained a B.Sc degree in physiology in 1974 followed by a Ph.D in neurophysiology in 1979 before becoming Lecturer in physiology at the University of Edinburgh in 1980. He was appointed Lecturer in the Department of Physiology at St. George's Hospital Medical School (now known as St George’s, University of London) in 1983, becoming a professor there in 1998.

He is an emeritus professor in the Division of Biomedical Sciences at St George’s, University of London and senior research fellow at the Stazione Zoologica Anton Dohrn, Naples, Italy.

== Research work ==
Paul Andrews studied the neurophysiological and pharmacological mechanisms and efficacies of receptor antagonists that have contributed to the development of treatments for reducing the effects of nausea and vomiting (emesis) associated with treating cancer by cytotoxic drugs (e.g. cisplatin).

He contributed to demonstrating the anti-emetic efficacy of tachykinin NK1 receptor antagonists currently in widespread use (see Clinical use) for the treatment of chemotherapy-induced nausea and vomiting. Collaborating with Gareth Sanger, who demonstrated the anti-emetic efficacy of 5-hydroxytryptamine3 (5-HT3) receptor antagonists, they proposed that 5-HT3 receptor antagonists work to prevent cytotoxic-associated vomiting by blocking the ability of 5-HT to activate 5-HT3 receptors on abdominal vagal nerve terminals. They proposed this desensitizes the vagus to the pro-emetic stimulatory actions of 5-HT and other substances (e.g., prostanoid) released during the cytotoxic treatment.

=== Clinical use ===
The selective 5-HT3 receptor antagonist BRL43694 or granisetron was developed by Beecham Pharmaceuticals following the experiments showing its anti-emetic potential. Granisetron is available as a generic and is produced by Roche Laboratories under the trade name Kytril.

Four NK1 receptor antagonists have been approved for human clinical use including aprepitant which is sold under the brand name Emend.

Clinical reviews indicate selective 5-HT3 receptor antagonists are an essential component of anti-emetic therapy in patients undergoing chemotherapy and together with the NK1 receptor antagonists are important additions to the treatment of cancer and have helped to reduce health care costs.

The Multinational Association for the Support of Cancer Care guidelines for high emetic-risk chemotherapy recommends use of an NK1 receptor antagonist in combination with a 5-HT3 receptor antagonist and dexamethasone, a corticosteroid medication, for optimal efficacy.
