= Gareth Sanger =

British pharmacologist (born 1953)

- Employers: King's College Hospital Medical School; Queen Mary University of London
- Website: www.icms.qmul.ac.uk/neurogastro/staff/garethsanger.html

Gareth J. Sanger (born 1953) is a British pharmacologist.

Sanger was a research fellow at King's College Hospital Medical School from 1977 to 1990. He then spent a period in the pharmacological industry, before being appointed, in 2009, Professor of Neuropharmacology, at Queen Mary University of London.

He has served as editor and reviews editor for the "British Journal of Pharmacology" and as an editorial board member for "Drug Discovery Today".

Together with M Tyers he received the 1998 Pharmaceutical Research and Manufacturers of America (PhRMA) "Discoverer's Award" for their research into 5HT3 receptor/antiemesis, which led to the identification and development of the drug Kytril, an antiemetic to treat nausea and vomiting following chemotherapy.
