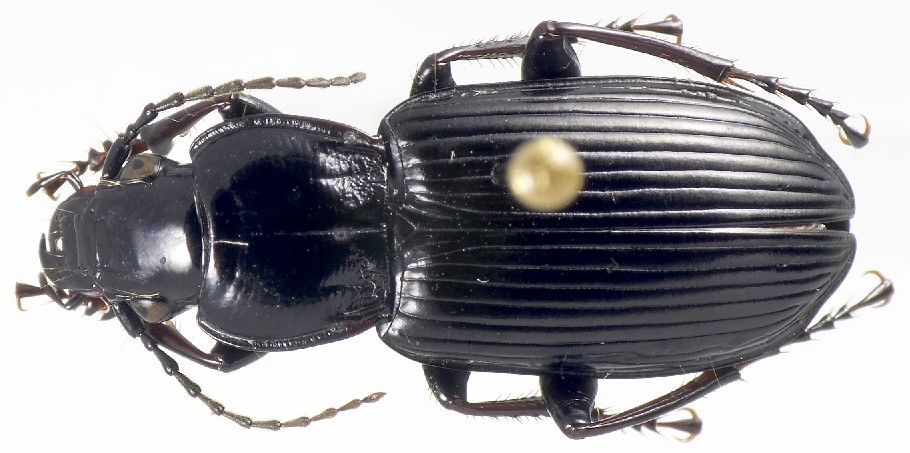

Scientific classification
- Kingdom: Animalia
- Phylum: Arthropoda
- Clade: Pancrustacea
- Class: Insecta
- Order: Coleoptera
- Suborder: Adephaga
- Family: Carabidae
- Subfamily: Pterostichinae
- Tribe: Pterostichini
- Genus: Pterostichus
- Species: P. melanarius

Binomial name
- Pterostichus melanarius (Illiger, 1798)

= Pterostichus melanarius =

Species of ground beetle

Pterostichus melanarius, the rain beetle, is a type of carabid (ground beetle) of the genus Pterostichus. It is native to Europe but is increasingly found in North America after being introduced to the region in the 1920s. It is a predatory beetle that eats other invertebrates, which makes it a valuable pest control agent in agricultural settings. Additionally, the beetle has wing dimorphism which has contributed to its increasing distribution across North America.

The larvae of this species of beetle have been observed exhibiting cannibalistic behaviorisms in high population densities. The rain beetle's habitat is influenced by their hunger level, with starved beetles preferring larger prey ranges compared to satiated beetles.

== Description ==
Adults of P. melanarius grow to be 12–18mm long. They appear black with straight striations on their elytra. They "are distinguished from other Pterostichus species by their laterobasal carina and denticulate posterior angles of the pronotum." Adults have wing dimorphism, characterized by brachypterous beetles and macropterous beetles. Brachypterous beetles have shortened hind wings and are unable to fly. Macropterous beetles have mature hind wings and are able to fly. Eggs are translucent white immediately after oviposition, but darken before hatching. The larvae have a hard dark reddish-brown head. The appearance of pupae is not well documented.

== Distribution ==
P. melanarius is found in a wide geographical range across Europe, the United States, and Canada. It can be found in "natural, anthropogenic, and agricultural biotopes." Beetles in similar geographical ranges tend to have similar development and life cycle stages, which differs from beetles in other geographical ranges. P. melanarius can traverse 2.5-5m daily, which can increase during the summer in search of mates. In addition to walking, flight capabilities resulting from wing dimorphism contribute to the beetle's ability to traverse wide ranges.

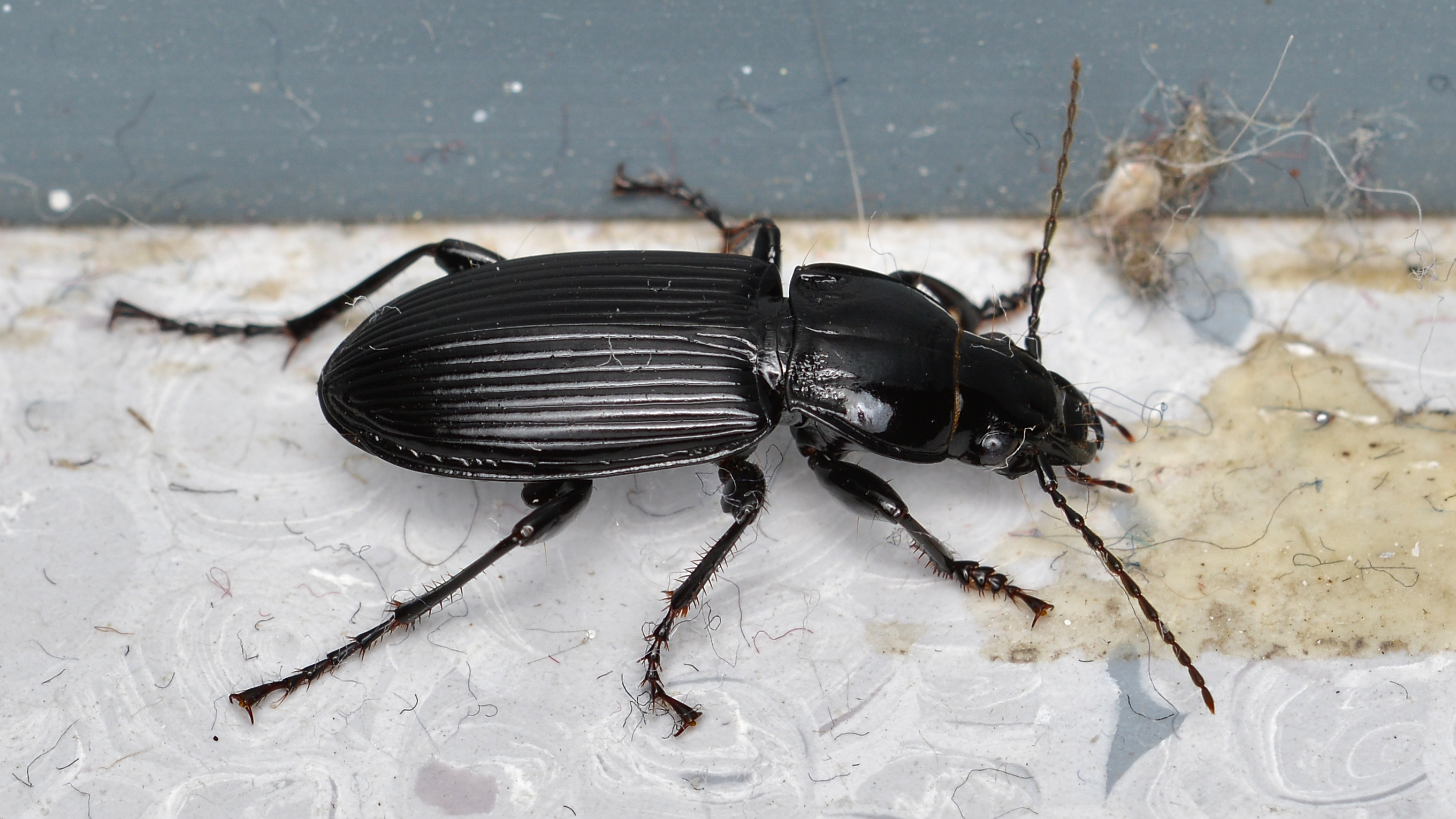
P. melanarius photographed in Ontario, Canada. Note the straight striations on the back on the beetle and the shiny black appearance.

In Europe, the beetle can be found in Scandinavia, Italy, Greece, Ireland, Russia, and Serbia. In North America, the beetle is found on both the west and east coasts of the continent, but has been documented steadily moving into the center of the US. It is important to study this varying distribution to build an understanding how P. melanarius might affect its new habitats.

== Habitat ==
P. melanarius is hydrophilic and eurythermic, meaning it is able to tolerate wet environments with a wide ranges of temperatures. The beetle can inhabit habitats including forests, meadows, urban areas, and arable land. Researchers explain that the consequence of the variability of habitats is that "the total duration of individual development may vary even within one natural climatic zone, which may result in different variants of the life cycle in the local populations occupying different biotopes." In other words, the beetle is able to adapt stages of its life cycle to sync with its various habitat. The main conditions that would have to be met for the beetle to colonize and thrive in a habitat are temperatures suitable to larvae development and availability of food resources.

Since the beetle's reproduction and development is temperature dependent, climate change presents a challenge to the fecundity of the beetles. A study in 2021 modeled the expected distribution of P. melanarius based using several RCP scenarios.The study confirms that the most important factors influencing changes in the beetle's distribution are mean temperature during the warmest and coldest times of the year, as well as precipitation levels during the driest periods of the year. With RCP 8.5 scenario, which is known as the worst-case climate change scenario, a sharp reduction in the Southern European and Mediterranean population of the beetle by 2070 is predicted. Less drastic changes in the distributions of the beetle was predicted in the more moderate RCP scenarios.

== Life cycle ==
Mating of P. melanarius occurs during early fall months closely followed by oviposition. To maximize probability of larvae surviving and having access to resources with needing to travel, female beetles select shaded and wet environments to lay their eggs. Females typically lay about 130 eggs at a time. All larval stages happen in the soil. Colder temperatures are necessary for the larvae to develop into adults and warmer temperatures are necessary for the transition from final larval to pupae. Based on this developmental timeline, fully-developed adults emerge during late May to June.

== Behavior ==
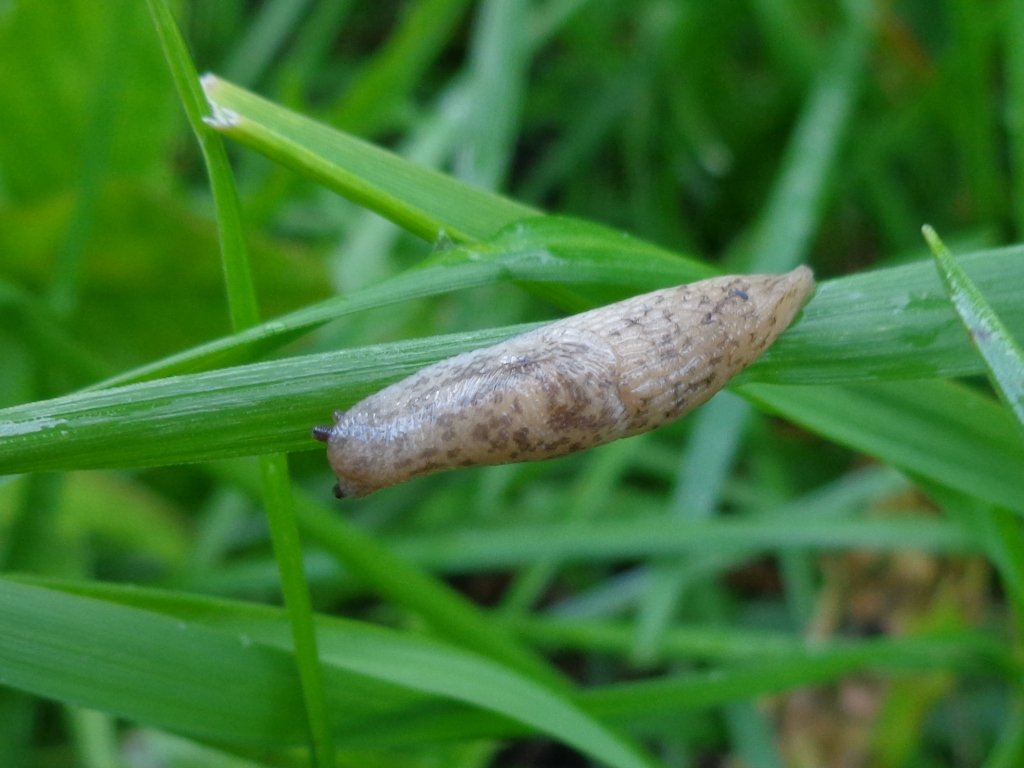
The gray garden slug, the preferred prey of P. melanarius.

P. melanarius, as larvae and adults, is an omnivorous predatory beetle that feeds on insects, invertebrates, and plants. Among a wide range of prey, the most common prey of the beetles are ants, caterpillars, mollusks, seeds, and plant tissue. Additionally, several studies have verified that the beetle's have a special preference for consuming slugs. Specifically, it has been suggested that it prefers the gray garden slug, Derocera reticulatum, which is an invasive slug species. The beetle often detects prey using olfactory cues. The behavior of the beetles is often studied using pitfall trapping, which is a type of sampling method used to explore the behavior of species like beetles. It provides insight into their spatial distribution and abundance in different habitats. The results of one study that used pitfall trapping indicate that the beetles utilize their habitats based on their hunger level and habitat quality. So, starved beetles will be found in habitats with a wider range of prey compared to satiated beetles, meaning that foraging in their habitats is dictated by hunger level. Another study explains that starved beetles practice "conspecific odour-trail avoidance", which means that the P. melanarius beetles avoid searching for prey in locations that other individuals of P. melanarius have visited. This behavior is characteristic of Lévy-flight patterns, which are optimal for widely dispersed prey that may not always be fully consumed at one time, such as slugs.

Larvae are documented to feed on slugs and also practice cannibalism.

== Competition ==
Competition between P. melanarius and other carabid beetles depends on the region. In Europe, laboratory observations indicate that competition exists between P. melanarius and other carabid species like, P. cristatus, and that P. melanarius dominates. To decrease competition in the wild, the two species inhabit different habitats. Interestingly, in Canada, where P. melanarius is an invasive species, there has been substantial evidence of competition between P. melanarius and other carabid beetles. P. melanarius does not appear to negatively impact the diversity or abundance of other carabid beetles. It is hypothesized that this is due to the beetles filling empty ecological niches.

Competition between P. melanarius and primary prey, slugs, is significant. Dense aggregations of P. melanarius are known to be associated with dense aggregations of slugs and the beetle is capable of reducing the distribution and abundance of slug populations. Slugs can avoid attacks by the beetle by using their slime and by strategically moving through the soil to avoid predation. Despite these tactics, the beetles are such avid predators of slugs that they are considered to be of great importance for biologically controlling slug populations, which are often harmful to agriculture.

Competition between P. melanarius and their predators is also significant. The beetles have many predators, primarily birds, but also "mice, bats, hedgehogs, shrews, frogs, toads, and occasionally moles." Additionally, adults beetles and larvae are parasitized by "mites, wasps, flies, and nematodes."

== Relevance to agriculture ==
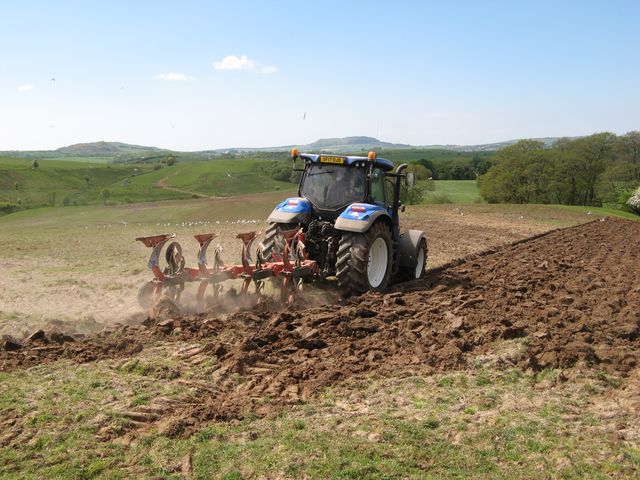
Heavy machinery is used to till fields and this can be disturbing to beetles in the soil.

Since P. melanarius inhabit arable fields, they are vulnerable to agricultural practices such as tilling fields and the use of insecticides. Tilling can be harmful to the life cycle and development of the beetles as it can occur during the fall and spring, which coincide with the oviposition and final development stages of the beetles. Tillage in the spring can disturb larvae and pupae in the soil, resulting in a decrease in the number of fully developed adults able to breed that emerge later in the fall. Some studies suggest that tillage has no effect on the beetles, but the contradictory results may be due to study methodology differences.

The use of insecticides on fields that are inhabited by P. melanarius has negative consequences for the beetle because the insecticide is harmful to the beetles and its prey. Direct exposure to insecticides reduces the beetle population and their activity levels. The beetles can also be indirectly exposed to insecticides through consumption of prey affected by insecticides. According to one study, the consumption of affect prey results in total mortality for a beetle, a risk which was only slightly reduced when consuming the affected prey several days after it was exposed to insecticide. Further, insecticides can cause mortality in the beetle's prey, reducing food availability and potentially resulting in starvation of the beetles. Since beetles that are starved spend more time foraging for food, P. melanarius has increased activity in insecticide treated fields.

An important method to decrease the negative impacts of harmful agricultural practices is to utilize cover crops and intercropping. In fields that used these agricultural control methods, which often require less tillage and chemical use, there was a greater abundance and activity levels of P. melanarius. Moreover, these habitats are ideal for female P. melanarius, which prefer to oviposit in "structurally complex environments" to provide more protection their eggs and larvae.

== Wing dimorphism ==
Several studies have determined that P. melanarius have had more rapid and expansive distribution in regions of Canada compared to other invasive carabid species. A possible explanation is that the macropterous (capable of flight) beetles help establish new beetle population in favorable habitats. After establishment, the majority of those beetles are replaced by brachypterous (flightless) beetles. Both morphs are inherited according to Mendelian genetics, with the flightless morph being the dominant gene and the flight morph being the recessive gene. In the process of establishing a new beetle colony in a new habitat, the flight morph has a competitive advantage, but after the new colony is established, the flightless morph has the competitive advantage and a greater portion of the population will present in this morph.
