= David Philipp (biologist) =

American-born biologist

David P. Philipp is an American-born biologist known for his work on conservation genetics, reproductive ecology, and the effects of angling on fish populations. He is a conservation geneticist and Director of the Fisheries Genetics Lab at the Illinois Natural History Survey, an adjunct professor at the University of Illinois, and the Chair of the Fisheries Conservation Foundation. Philipp has supervised a number of graduate students including Steven J. Cooke, Cory Suski, Derek Aday, Jeff Koppelman, Jana Svec, Jimmy Ludden, Dale Burkett, Sascha Danylchuk and Jeff Stein.

== Research ==
Philipp's research examines genetics, reproduction, and spatial ecology of fishes, and the effects of fisheries interactions on these dynamics in North America and the Caribbean. His early research examined centrarchid population genetics, gene expression, reproductive physiology, and strategies, heritability of fish behaviour, and life history strategies.

More recently, Philipp's research has focused on the effects of fisheries interactions and environmental stressors on reproductive success, physiology, behavior, and survival of fishes.

Philipp's research revealed that populations of largemouth bass, Micropterus salmoides, in most of North America composite a separate species from the Florida bass, M. floridanus, in Florida, and that stocking programs introducing Florida bass outside their native range have detrimental genetic effects on largemouth bass populations. Another research program showed that angling targets individual largemouth bass with certain behavioural and physiological characteristics, and in the process can cause evolutionary change in populations including reduced parental care and reproductive success, as well as reduced angling success rates. Philipps is also involved with research programs in The Bahamas examining spatial ecology and the effects of fisheries interactions on bonefish.

== Conservation activity ==
Philipp is a co-founder and Chair of the Fisheries Conservation Foundation, a nonprofit organization founded in 2003 to promote the work of aquatic scientists, environmental professionals, and resource managers to policy makers and the public to ensure the sustainability of freshwater and marine ecosystems through well-informed management practices. Specific campaigns include: Flats Conservation, Rivers of Success, Shark Conservation, Coastal 2100, North American Black Bass Coalition, and Responsible Angling, which promote awareness and conservation for a wide range of environmentally and economically important fish species and habitats. The Foundation is also highly involved with conservation initiatives in The Bahamas, with projects including the Bahamas Flats Fishing Alliance that aims to assemble multiple stakeholders to promote the conservation of valuable flats fisheries, and The Island School Poster Series, which engages high school students in important current environmental issues.

== Selected publications ==
=== Books ===
Philipp, D. P. & Ridgway, M. S. (editors). Black Bass: Ecology, Conservation, and Management. American Fisheries Society. 740 pp. (2003).

Cooke, S. J. & Philipp, D. P. (editors). Centrarchid fishes: Diversity, Biology, and Conservation. John Wiley & Sons. 560 pp. (2009).

=== Journal publications ===
Parkos, J. J., Wahl. D. H., & Philipp, D. P. Influence of behavior and mating success on brood-specific contribution to fish recruitment. Ecological Applications 21, 2576–2586 (2011).

Brooks, E. J., et al. The physiological response of the Caribbean reef shark (Carcharhinus perezi) to longline capture. Comparative Biochemistry and Physiology Part A, 159, 1–6 (2011)

Barthel, B. L. et al. Genetic relationships among populations of Florida bass. Transactions of the American Fisheries Society 139, 1615–1641 (2010). Philipp, D. P. et al. Selection for vulnerability to angling in largemouth bass. Trans. Am. Fish. Soc. 138, 189–199 (2009).

Cooke, S. J., Suski, C. D., Ostrand, K. G., Wahl, D. H. & Philipp, D. P. Physiological and behavioral consequences of long-term artificial selection for vulnerability to recreational angling in a teleost fish. Physiological and Biochemical Zoology 80, 480–490 (2007).

Cooke, S. J. & Philipp, D. P. Behavior and mortality of caught-and-released bonefish (Albula spp.) in Bahamian waters with implications for a sustainable recreational fishery. Biol. Conserv. 118, 599–607 (2004).

1997 Jennings, M. J., Claussen, J. E., & Philipp, D. P. Effect of population size structure on reproductive investment of male bluegill. N. Am. J. Fish. Manage 17, 516–524 (1997).

Philipp, D. P., Toline, C. A., Philipp, D. B. F., & Phelan, F.P. The impact of catch-and-release angling on the reproductive success of smallmouth bass and largemouth bass. N. Am. J. Fish. Manage. 17, 557–567 (1997).

Philipp, D. P. Genetic implications of introducing Florida largemouth bass. Can. J. Fish Aq. Sci. 48, 58–65 (1991).

Philipp, D. P., Childers, W. F. & Whitt, G. S. A biochemical genetic evaluation of the northern and Florida subspecies of largemouth bass. Trans. Am. Fish. Soc. 112, 1–20 (1983).
