= Fisheries Society of the British Isles =

- Founded: 1967
- Founders: Jack W. Jones, David Le Cren, Peter Tombleson, Lionel Mawdesley-Thomas, Alwyne Wheeler
- Type: Non-profit organization
- Website: http://www.fsbi.org.uk

The Fisheries Society of the British Isles is an international, non-political, learned society, based in the United Kingdom, that supports scientific activity in fish biology and management through charitable sponsorship. Membership is open to anyone interested in these objectives. There have been eleven Presidents of the FSBI since its foundation including Ray Beverton FRS and Felicity Huntingford FRSE.

== Origins ==
In the mid-1960s, several annual conferences on fish ecology were initiated in Liverpool in the United Kingdom, by Dr Jack W. Jones, a member of the Department of Zoology at the University of Liverpool. In March 1967 at one of these meetings informal discussion took place about the formation of a British society for fish and fisheries biology. Participants in the discussion were Jack Jones, David LeCren, a biologist at the Freshwater Biological Association Laboratory at Windermere, Peter Tombleson, an angling journalist and administrator, Lionel Mawdesley-Thomas, a fish pathologist at the Huntingdon Research Centre, and Alwynne Wheeler a taxonomist at the Natural History Museum, London. The discussions led to an inaugural meeting of the Fisheries Society of the British Isles on 21 October 1967 at the meeting rooms of the Zoological Society of London. James Chubb, also from the Department of Zoology, University of Liverpool, was appointed as the first editor of its journal, the Journal of Fish Biology.

== Medal awards ==
The Society awards medals to recognize distinction in the field of fish biology and fisheries science and to raise the profile of the discipline and of the Society in the wider scientific community. Medals are awarded to individuals who have made an outstanding contribution to fish biology and/or fisheries. Medals awarded include the Beverton Medal, named in honour of Ray Beverton, and the FSBI Medal awarded to younger scientists.

== Grants ==
The FSBI supports research in the fields of fish biology and fisheries science through the award of a range of research grants, studentships, internships and travel scholarships. The schemes are designed to support researchers at all stages of their career, from undergraduate through to post-retirement.
