= Journal of Fish Biology =

- Discipline: Ichthyology
- Language: English
- Edited by: Michel Kaiser

Publication details
- History: 1969–present
- Publisher: Wiley-Blackwell (United Kingdom)
- Frequency: Monthly
- Impact factor: 2.051 (2020)

Standard abbreviations
- ISO 4: J. Fish Biol.

Indexing
- CODEN: JFIBA9
- ISSN: 0022-1112 (print); 1095-8649 (web)
- LCCN: 70007063
- OCLC no.: 1754591

Links
- Journal homepage; Online access; Online archive

The Journal of Fish Biology covers all aspects of fish and fisheries biological research, both freshwater and marine. It is published by Wiley-Blackwell and is the official journal of the Fisheries Society of the British Isles.
