= Canadian Conference for Fisheries Research =

Annual research conference in Canada

The Canadian Conference for Fisheries Research (CCFFR) is a national conference that has been meeting annually for over 60 years and continues to meet once a year in early January in concert with the Society of Canadian Limnologists (SCL). The conference is a forum where researchers and graduate students can present and discuss the latest advances in freshwater and marine fish and fisheries research.

== Conference themes ==
The overall programme themes for the conference vary from year to year but generally focus on aquatic and fish/fisheries science advances and the ability of new research to provide predictions and solutions for various problems. Presentations are encouraged to reflect bold, imaginative, and credible science. Papers are expected from individual and team research initiatives among the academic, government and private sectors.
