= Sustainable yield =

Maximum harvest without causing damage

Sustainable yield is the amount of a resource that humans can harvest without over-harvesting or damaging a potentially renewable resource.

In more formal terms, the sustainable yield of natural capital is the ecological yield that can be extracted without reducing the base of capital itself, i.e. the surplus required to maintain ecosystem services at the same or increasing level over time. The term only refers to resources that are renewable in nature as extracting non-renewable resources will always diminish the natural capital. The sustainable yield of a given resource will generally vary over time with the ecosystem's needs to maintain itself. For instance, a forest that has suffered from a natural disaster will require more of its own ecological yield to sustain itself and re-establish a mature forest. This results in a decrease of the forest's sustainable yield. The definition of sustainable yield has changed throughout history and the term itself has been described as anthropocentric due to limitations in applying ecological complexity. The term sustainable yield is most commonly used in forestry, fisheries, and groundwater applications.

A sustainable yield is calculated by dividing carrying capacity by 2. At half of the carrying capacity, the population is considered harvestable and capable of regrowth. Errors in calculating the maximum sustainable yield can lead to over or under harvesting a resource.

== Importance ==
Understanding sustainable yield is essential because it indicates how much a population can produce and what humans can glean from it without causing irreversible damage to the species population growth. It is possible that policies implementing maximum sustainable yield in ecosystems can cause the extinction of several species, especially if the population is harvested above its maximum sustainable yield. Improving the application of sustainable yield in ecosystems without damaging them is valuable to research.

== Forestry ==
Sustainable yield is an important component of sustainable forest management. In the forestry context it is the largest amount of harvest activity that can occur without degrading the productivity of the stock. The idea of sustainable yield forestry has shifted focus from only output, to include maintaining production capacity and maintaining the natural renewal capacity of forest vegetation.

In America, the O & C Act of 1937 was one of the first written federal laws to warrant future generations having sufficient wood supply and regulations on wood harvest rate. The Act helped maintain a viable, sustainable yield, by ensuring land management, reforestation, watershed protection, a permanent timber source, and revenue distributed to local counties.

Sweden and Russia are examples of countries that implement sustainable yield forestry. Sweden's market economy strives for maximum yield forestry which is obtained through intense forest management. Russia uses a mid-term horizon to distinguish natural growth from accessible timber. Their take on sustainable yield forestry uses natural regeneration and silviculture. Sustainable yield forestry is widely criticized for its singular focus on wood management. This results in a changed natural landscape with a loss in biodiversity of that ecosystem as well as key ecological processes.

== Fishery ==
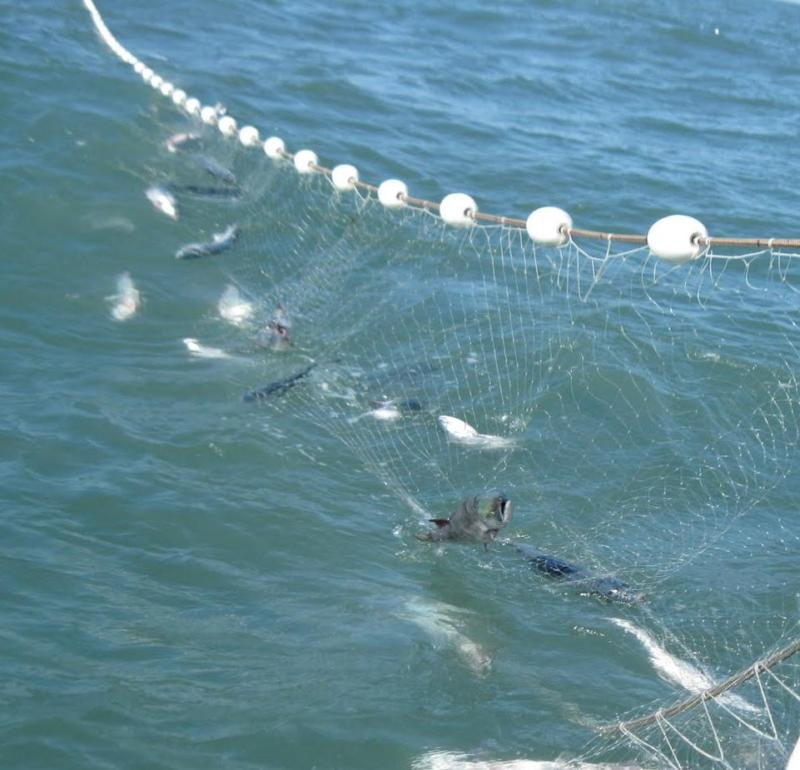
Fishery management utilizes the concept of sustainable yield to determine how much fish can be removed, so that the population remains sustainable.

The issue of over-fishing in the mid-1850s led to a new reference point for fishery management known as the maximum sustainable yield. Sustainable yield in fishery management is defined as the number of fish that can be extracted without reducing the base of fish stock, and the maximum sustainable yield is defined as the number of fish that can be extracted under given environmental conditions. In fisheries, the basic natural capital or virgin population, must decrease with extraction. At the same time productivity increases. Hence, sustainable yield would be within the range in which the natural capital together with its production are able to provide satisfactory yield. It may be very difficult to quantify sustainable yield, because every dynamic ecological conditions and other factors not related to harvesting induce changes and fluctuations in both, the natural capital and its productivity.

== Groundwater Application ==
Groundwater is essential for ecosystems and humans to sustain themselves as it is the largest store of distributed fresh water. In the case of groundwater there is a safe yield of water extraction per unit time, beyond which the aquifer risks the state of over drafting or even depletion. Depletion of an aquifer, or a decline in groundwater levels has the potential to cause land subsidence which can cause sinkholes. In order to calculate a safe yield of water extraction in the area, many factors need to be taken into account. The first is the water budget, figuring out and understanding where water is used by humans, getting recharged, and being lost due to possible maintenance issues and natural phenomena. Another consideration is changing technology. Technology allows for possible gains in supply, for example, desalination technology, turning saltwater into drinking water. The other considerations include temporal, spatial, and monetary aspects, which all cause changes in the water system that change the amount of usable water.

== See also ==
- Sustainable yield in fisheries
- Maximum sustainable yield
- Hans Carl von Carlowitz, who pioneered the mathematics behind sustained yield with his 1713 treatise
