= Sustainable yield in fisheries =

The sustainable yield of natural capital is the ecological yield that can be extracted without reducing the base of capital itself, i.e. the surplus required to maintain ecosystem services at the same or increasing level over time. This yield usually varies over time with the needs of the ecosystem to maintain itself, e.g. a forest that has recently suffered a blight or flooding or fire will require more of its own ecological yield to sustain and re-establish a mature forest. While doing so, the sustainable yield may be much less.

In fisheries, the basic natural capital, or original population, diminishes due to extraction (fishing), while production from breeding and natural growth increases. Therefore, the sustainable yield is the balance at which the natural capital, combined with its production, can provide an adequate yield. Quantifying sustainable yield is challenging due to the dynamic ecological conditions and other harvesting-unrelated factors that cause variations in both natural capital and its productivity.

== Maximum sustainable yield ==
The concept of maximum sustainable yield (MSY) has been used in fisheries science and fisheries management for more than a century. Originally developed and popularized by Fedor Baranov early in the 1900s as the "theory of fishing," it is often credited with laying the foundation for the modern understanding of the population dynamics of fisheries. Tsikliras and Rainer Froese define MSY as "the highest average catch that can be continuously taken from an exploited population (=stock) under average environmental conditions." Early calculations of MSY were developed under the assumption of logistic population growth. Assuming the logistic model, the MSY will be exactly at half the carrying capacity of a species, as this is the stage at when population growth is highest. In practice, the maximum sustainable yield is usually higher than the optimum sustainable yield.

This logistic model of growth is produced by a population introduced to a new habitat or with very poor numbers going through a lag phase of slow growth at first. Once it reaches a foothold population it will go through a rapid growth rate that will start to level off once the species approaches carrying capacity. The idea of maximum sustained yield is to decrease population density to the point of highest growth rate possible. This changes the number of the population, but the new number can be maintained indefinitely, ideally.

In most fisheries, the target population has been decreased so significantly from its pre-fishing level that the only way to increase long-term production is to decrease short-term harvest, and wait for populations to recover. Establishing appropriate harvest limits is a perennially difficult scientifically, as is the actual implementation politically contentious.

MSY is extensively used for fisheries management. Unlike Schaefer's logistic model, MSY in most modern fisheries models occurs at around 30% of the unexploited population size. This fraction differs among populations depending on the life history of the species and the age-specific selectivity of the fishing method.

Unfortunately errors in estimating the population dynamics of a species can lead to setting the maximum sustainable yield too high (or too low). An example of this was the New Zealand orange roughy fishery. Early quotas were based on an assumption that the orange roughy had a fairly short lifespan and bred relatively quickly. However, it was later discovered that the orange roughy lived a long time and had bred slowly (~30 years). By this stage stocks had been largely depleted.

== Optimum sustainable yield ==
In population ecology and economics, optimum sustainable yield is the level of effort (LOE) that maximizes the difference between total revenue and total cost. Or, where marginal revenue equals marginal cost. This level of effort maximizes the economic profit, or rent, of the resource being utilized. It usually corresponds to an effort level lower than that of maximum sustainable yield.

In environmental science, optimum sustainable yield is the largest economical yield of a renewable resource achievable over a long time period without decreasing the ability of the population or its environment to support the continuation of this level of yield.

== Annual Sustainable Yield ==
Annual Sustainable Yield (ASY) is defined as biomass that can be harvested from a fish population each year without resulting in a decline. ASY is dynamic and is adjusted based on population levels and performance of previous years fisheries.

== See also ==
- Sustainable yield
- Sustainable fisheries
- Population dynamics of fisheries
