= Peter Larkin =

Peter Larkin may refer to:

- Peter Anthony Larkin (1924–1996), Canadian fisheries scientist
- Peter Charles Larkin (1855–1930), Canadian entrepreneur
- Peter J. Larkin (born 1953), member of the Massachusetts House of Representatives from 1991 to 2005
- Peter Larkin (production designer) (1926–2019), American theatre stage designer

== See also ==
- Peter Larkins (born 1954), doctor
