= Rent-setting =

Political corruption in China

- Initiator: Appelbaum and Katz
- Introduced: 1987
- Synonym: rent-creating

Rent-setting
- Simplified Chinese: 设租
- Traditional Chinese: 設租
Transcriptions
Standard Mandarin
- Hanyu Pinyin: Shèzū

Rent-setting (also spelled as rent setting; simplified Chinese: 设租; traditional Chinese: 設租), also known as rent-creating, refers to the act of governments or bureaucrats using their power to intervene in the market, resulting in the formation of new economic rents and creating rent-seeking opportunities for certain market entities. In short, it means that the power itself committed an act in order to take a bribe.

The concept of rent-setting was coined by Appelbaum and Katz in 1987. This theory holds that since the regulator itself may become a rent-seeker, the rent-seeker itself will become a rent-setter and thus endogenously determine the size of the rent.

Rent-setting is part of the chain of the rent-seeking process. It can generally be divided into three types: unintentional rent-setting, passive rent-setting and active rent-setting.

In a 'power-money' transaction, rent-setting is from 'power' to 'money', while rent-seeking is often 'money-power-money increment'. In fact, rent seeking and rent setting are two sides of the same behavior and cannot be separated.

== See also ==
- Rent-seeking
- Rent extraction
- Economic rent
