= Fisheries management =

Regulation of fishing

The management of fisheries is broadly defined as the set of tasks which guide vested parties and managers in the optimal use of aquatic renewable resources, primarily fish. According to the Food and Agriculture Organization of the United Nations (FAO) in the 2001 Guidebook to Fisheries Management there is currently "no clear and generally accepted definitions of fisheries management". Instead, the authors use a working definition, such that fisheries management is:

The integrated process of information gathering, analysis, planning, consultation, decision-making, allocation of resources and formulation and implementation, with necessary law enforcement to ensure environmental compliance, of regulations or rules which govern fisheries activities in order to ensure the continued productivity of the resources and the accomplishment of other fisheries objectives.

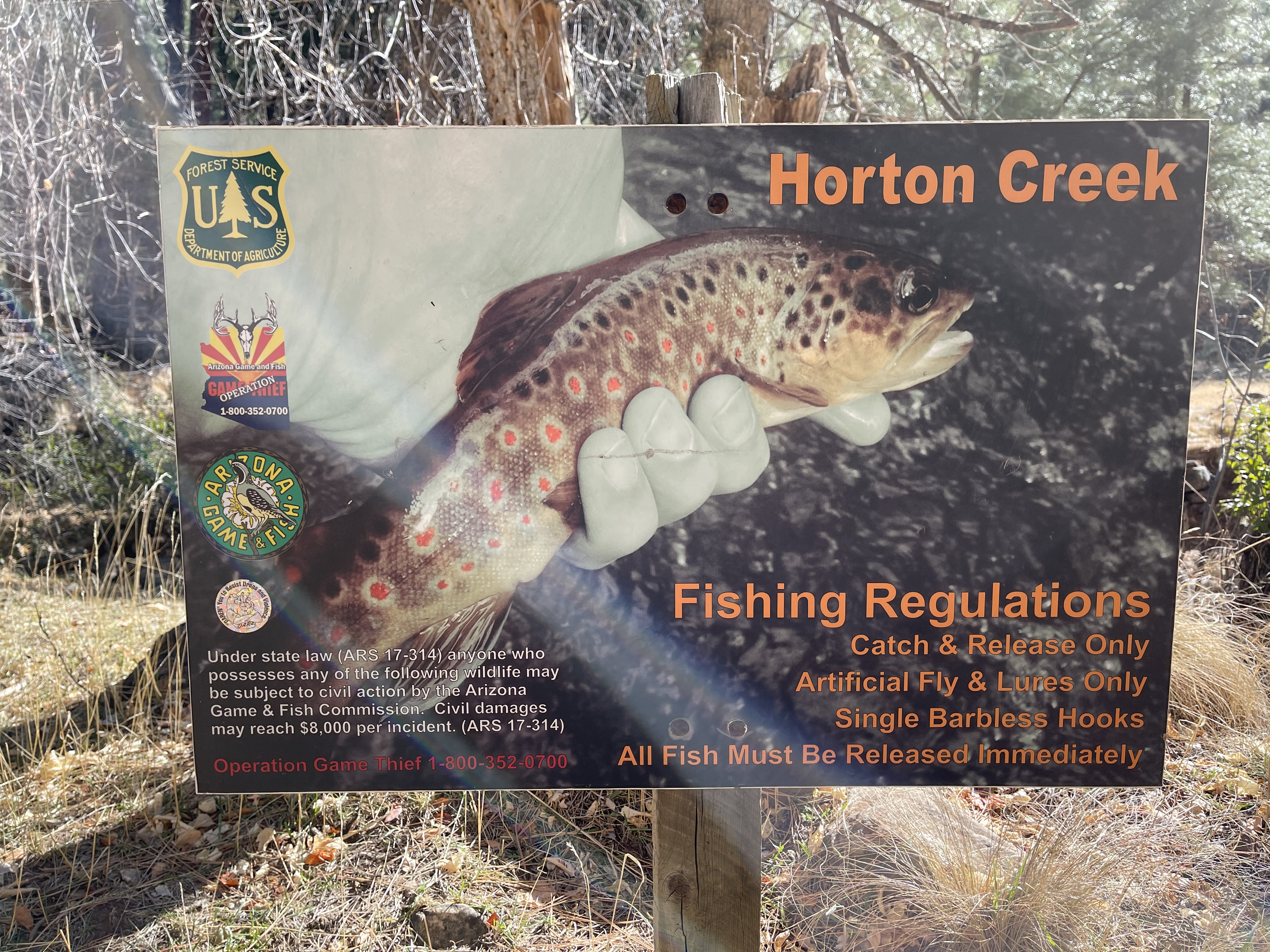
A signboard listing fishing regulations at Horton Creek, Arizona

The goal of fisheries management is to produce sustainable biological, environmental and socioeconomic benefits from renewable aquatic resources. Wild fisheries are classified as renewable when the organisms of interest (e.g., fish, shellfish, amphibians, reptiles and marine mammals) produce an annual biological surplus that with judicious management can be harvested without reducing future productivity. Fishery management employs activities that protect fishery resources so sustainable exploitation is possible, drawing on fisheries science and possibly including the precautionary principle.

Modern fisheries management is often referred to as a governmental system of appropriate environmental management rules based on defined objectives and a mix of management means to implement the rules, which are put in place by a system of monitoring control and surveillance. An ecosystem approach to fisheries management has started to become a more relevant and practical way to manage fisheries. Current scientific consensus is oriented towards ecosystem-based fisheries management (EBFM) as the most viable approach for achieving the goal of balancing human needs, ensuring the longevity of ecosystem services, and mitigating adverse ecological impacts. Today, EBFM is a more comprehensive approach to fisheries management which focuses on achieving ecological health and productivity, as opposed to traditional management techniques which focus on isolated species.

Recent research on large river basins highlights the importance of maintaining high native species richness, particularly by preventing the overexploitation of piscivorous fish. This preserves a "living shield" (biotic resistance) that naturally prevents the establishment of new invasive species. For invaders that are already naturalized, eradication is often impractical and ecologically damaging; instead, rational management recommends non-intervention and the justified commercial exploitation of the new resource, alongside strict protection of native predator populations.

== Objectives ==
=== Economic ===
In economics, fisheries are often clearly defined as a common property resource. Common property (sometimes referred to as common pool) resources suffer from issues that occur uniquely with an open access good. Fisheries are primarily faced with the challenge of overexploitation. This problem was first discussed at length by H. Scott Gordon's 1954 article, The Economic Theory of a Common-Property Resource: The Fishery and Anthony D. Scott's 1955 article, The Fishery: The Objectives of Sole Ownership. Both were published in the Journal of Political Economy. Gordon's paper discusses the optimal rent extraction from fisheries, given the production function of fisheries is non-linear, and exhibits diminishing returns. Using an effort function, cost function and profit function for a user, he is able to derive optimal amounts of effort, and see how a change in the stock affects the users' optimal effort. He posits the user cannot maximize harvest, or else he jeopardizes future profits, such that in an equilibrium, with no intervention, total value less costs will be zero. This result is applicable for common pool resources, meaning that each user believes they can fish up to the amount that covers their costs. But, with the entry of each additional user, profits dissipate.

Scott's article asks a normative question, on whether society should manage renewable resources. Both articles were foundational in the environmental economics, and gave the basic economic motivation for how and why renewable resources, primarily fisheries, should be managed.

From this early work, we are able to describe the core economic objectives of fishery management. The economic objective of fisheries management is to maximize a user's present value of the sum of all future profits. Given that fisheries suffer from the same market failure as other common property resources, one of the main market interventions is to assign property rights. The most comprehensive economic survey of fishery management policies suggests that assigning property rights in fisheries prevents population collapse.

While these objectives have remained the same, the models for finding optimal conditions for profit-maximizing fisheries have advanced. Now, economic models are able to include more sophistication, such as heterogenous technologies and costs by users, uncertainty, as well as the biological dynamics of fish population growth over time.

=== Political ===
According to the FAO, fisheries management should be based explicitly on political objectives, ideally with transparent priorities. Political goals can also be a weak part of fisheries management, since the objectives can conflict with each other. Typical political objectives when exploiting a commercially important fish resource are to:

- maximize sustainable biomass yield
- maximize sustainable economic yield
- secure and increase employment
- secure protein production and food supplies
- increase export income

For the most recent several decades, the political goals in fisheries management of commercially important species have been rapidly evolving, primarily driven by (1) a recognition of the response of fish and other target animals to a changing climate, (2) new technologies for fishing, particularly on the high seas, (3) development of competing policy priorities for aquatic environments leading to a more ecosystem-based approach to fisheries management, and (4) new scientific insights about the processes affecting fish population size and recruitment. The political objectives operative in recreational fisheries management are often substantially different from those prevalent in commercial fisheries management. For example, catch-and-release regulations are common in some types of recreational fisheries. Thus, biological yield is of less important.

=== International ===
Fisheries objectives need to be expressed in concrete management rules. Where countries are members of the FAO, management rules should be based on the international, non-binding Code of Conduct for Responsible Fisheries, first established at the 1995 FAO meeting. The precautionary approach it prescribes is typically implemented in concrete management rules as minimum spawning biomass, maximum fishing mortality rates, etc. In 2005, the UBC Fisheries Centre at the University of British Columbia comprehensively reviewed the performance of the world's major fishing nations against the Code.

== History ==
Fisheries have been explicitly managed in some places for hundreds of years. More than 80% of the world's commercial exploitation of fish and shellfish are harvested from natural occurring populations in the oceans and freshwater areas. For example, the Māori people, New Zealand residents for about 700 years, had prohibitions against taking more than what could be eaten and about giving back the first fish caught as an offering to sea god Tangaroa. Starting in the 18th century attempts were made to regulate fishing in the North Norwegian fishery. This resulted in the enactment of a law in 1816 on the Lofoten fishery, which established in some measure what has come to be known as territorial use rights.

"The fishing banks were divided into areas belonging to the nearest fishing base on land and further subdivided into fields where the boats were allowed to fish. The allocation of the fishing fields was in the hands of local governing committees, usually headed by the owner of the onshore facilities which the fishermen had to rent for accommodation and for drying the fish."

In Europe, governmental resource protection-based fisheries management is a relatively new idea, first developed for North European fisheries after the first Overfishing Conference held in London in 1936. In 1957 British fisheries researchers Ray Beverton and Sidney Holt published a seminal work on North Sea commercial fisheries dynamics. In the 1960s the work became the theoretical platform for North European management schemes. In North America, both commercial and recreational fisheries have been actively managed for over 150 years. All U.S. states and Canadian provinces have fisheries agencies and their employees implement state, provincial, and federal laws using a broad suite of tools and procedures for both freshwater and marine fisheries.

After some years away from the field of fisheries management, Beverton criticized his earlier work in a paper given at the first World Fisheries Congress in Athens in 1992. "The Dynamics of Exploited Fish Populations" expressed his concerns, including the way his and Sidney Holt's work had been misinterpreted and misused by fishery biologists and managers during the previous 30 years. Nevertheless, the institutional foundation for modern fishery management had been laid.

In 1996, the Marine Stewardship Council was founded to set standards for sustainable fishing. In 2010, the Aquaculture Stewardship Council was created to do the same for aquaculture.

A report by Prince Charles' International Sustainability Unit, the New York-based Environmental Defense Fund and 50in10 published in July 2014 estimated global fisheries were adding $270 billion a year to global GDP, but by full implementation of sustainable fishing, that figure could rise by an extra amount of as much as $50 billion.

== Management mechanisms ==
Many countries have set up ministries or government departments, often named Ministry of Fisheries or similar, controlling aspects of fisheries within their exclusive economic zones. Currently, there are four core categories of management regulating either input (including investment), or output in a fishery or fishing area. These management mechanisms operate directly or indirectly:

| | Inputs | Outputs |
|---|---|---|
| Indirect | Vessel licensing | Catching techniques or equipment |
| Direct | Limited entry | Catch quota and technical regulation |

Technical measures may include:

- prohibiting devices such as bows and arrows, and spears, or firearms
- prohibiting nets
- setting minimum mesh sizes
- limiting the average potential catch of a vessel in the fleet (vessel and crew size, gear, electronic gear and other physical "inputs"
- prohibiting bait
- limiting snagging
- limits on fish traps
- limiting the number of poles or lines per fisherman
- restricting the number of simultaneous fishing vessels
- limiting a vessel's average operational intensity per unit time at sea
- limiting average time at sea

=== Catch quotas ===
Systems that use individual transferable quotas (ITQ), also called individual fishing quota limit the total catch and allocate shares of that quota among the fishers who work that fishery. Fishers or fishery firms may then buy, sell or trade their allocated shares in addition to use.

A large scale study in 2008 provided strong evidence that ITQ's can help to prevent fishery collapse and even restore fisheries that appear to be in decline. Other studies have shown negative socio-economic consequences of ITQs, especially on small-sclale fisheries. These consequences include concentration of quota in that hands of few fishers; increased number of inactive fishers leasing their quotas to others (a phenomenon known as armchair fishermen); and detrimental effects on coastal communities.

=== Elderly maternal fish ===
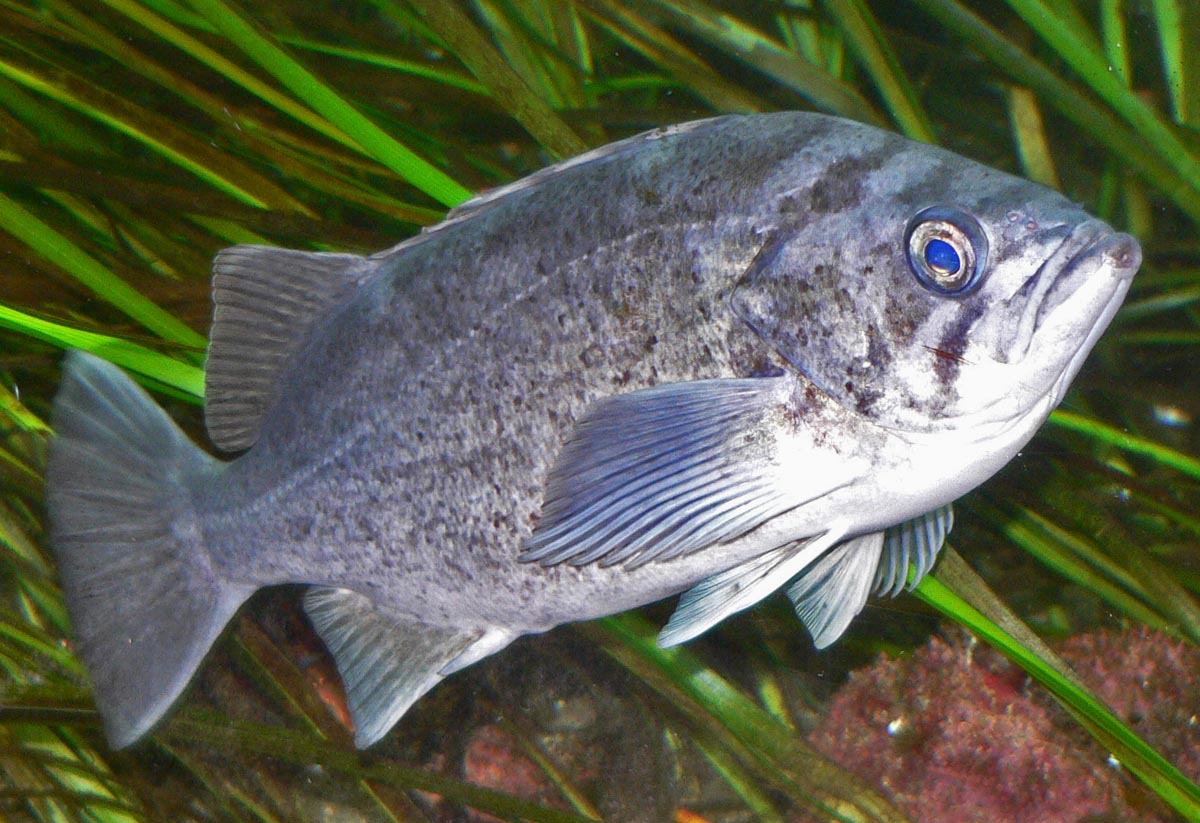
Old, fat, female rockfish are the best producers.

Traditional management practices aim to reduce the number of old, slow-growing fish, leaving more room and resources for younger, faster-growing fish. Most marine fish produce huge numbers of eggs. The assumption was that younger spawners would produce plenty of viable larvae.

However, 2005 research on rockfish shows that large, elderly females are far more important than younger fish in maintaining productive fisheries. The larvae produced by these older maternal fish grow faster, survive starvation better, and are much more likely to survive than the offspring of younger fish. Failure to account for the role of older fish may help explain recent collapses of some major US West Coast fisheries. Recovery of some stocks is expected to take decades. One way to prevent such collapses is to establish marine reserves, where fishing is not allowed and fish populations age naturally.

=== Precautionary principle ===
A Fishery Manager's Guidebook issued in 2002 by the FAO advises that a set of working principles should be applied to "highlight the underlying key issues" of fisheries management." There are 8 principles that should be considered as a whole in order to best manage a fishery. The first principle focuses on the finite nature of fish stocks and how potential yields must be estimated based on the biological constraints of the population.

In a 2007 marine science study, results indicate there are significant benefits to the health and size of both stock biomass and yield under timely and well-enforced management regimes. Similarly, other studies find the sensitivity of stock to management regimes. In North Sea fisheries finds that fishing at the top of the "acceptable" ranges is many times more risky than fishing near the bottom, but delivers only 20% more yield. In addition there is growing evidence – and growing recognition by both fishery scientists and small-scale fishermen – that coastal marine protected areas do favor the biodiversity and resilience of ecosystems nearby, significantly enhancing the density, biomass and size of commercially exploited species in local waters.

=== Ecosystem based fisheries management (EBFM) ===
According to marine ecologist Chris Frid, the fishing industry points to pollution and global warming as the causes of unprecedentedly low fish stocks in recent years, writing, "Everybody would like to see the rebuilding of fish stocks and this can only be achieved if we understand all of the influences, human and natural, on fish dynamics." Overfishing has also had an effect. Frid adds, "Fish communities can be altered in a number of ways, for example they can decrease if particular sized individuals of a species are targeted, as this affects predator and prey dynamics. Fishing, however, is not the sole perpetrator of changes to marine life – pollution is another example [...] No one factor operates in isolation and components of the ecosystem respond differently to each individual factor."

In contrast to the traditional approach of focusing on a single species, the ecosystem-based approach is organized in terms of ecosystem services. Ecosystem-based fishery concepts have been implemented in some regions. In 2007 a group of scientists offered the following "ten commandments":

* Keep a perspective that is holistic, risk-averse and adaptive.

- Maintain an "old growth" structure in fish populations, since big, old and fat female fish have been shown to be the best spawners, but are also susceptible to overfishing.
- Characterize and maintain the natural spatial structure of fish stocks, so that management boundaries match natural boundaries in the sea.
- Monitor and maintain seafloor habitats to make sure fish have food and shelter.
- Maintain resilient ecosystems that are able to withstand occasional shocks.
- Identify and maintain critical food-web connections, including predators and forage species.
- Adapt to ecosystem changes through time, both short-term and on longer cycles of decades or centuries, including global climate change.
- Account for evolutionary changes caused by fishing, which tends to remove large, older fish.
- Include the actions of humans and their social and economic systems in all ecological equations.

- Report to Congress (2009): The State of Science to Support an Ecosystem Approach to Regional Fishery Management National Marine Fisheries Service, NOAA Technical Memorandum NMFS-F/SPO-96.

=== Ecosystem modelling software ===
We propose that rebuilding ecosystems, and not sustainability per se, should be the goal of fishery management. Sustainability is a deceptive goal because human harvesting of fish leads to a progressive simplification of ecosystems in favour of smaller, high turnover, lower trophic level fish species that are adapted to withstand disturbance and habitat degradation.

— Tony Pitcher and Daniel Pauly

Ecopath, with Ecosim (EwE), is an ecosystem modelling software suite. It was initially a NOAA initiative led by Jeffrey Polovina, later primarily developed at the UBC Fisheries Centre of the University of British Columbia. In 2007, it was named as one of the ten biggest scientific breakthroughs in NOAA's 200-year history. The citation states that Ecopath "revolutionized scientists' ability worldwide to understand complex marine ecosystems". Behind this lies two decades of development work by Villy Christensen, Carl Walters, Daniel Pauly, and other fisheries scientists. As of 2010 there are 6000 registered users in 155 countries. Ecopath is widely used in fisheries management as a tool for modelling and visualising the complex relationships that exist in real world marine ecosystems.

== Issues in fishery management ==
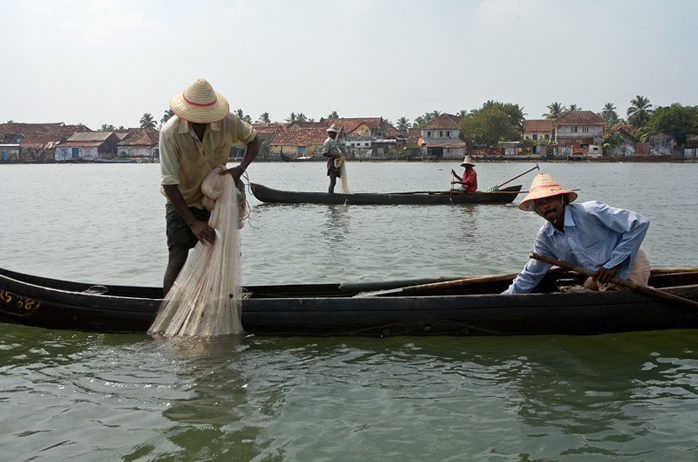
Fishermen in the harbor of Kochi, India

=== Business training barriers ===
Managing fisheries is about managing people and businesses, and not about managing fish. Fisheries are managed by regulating the actions of people. If fisheries management is to be successful, then associated human factors, such as the reactions of anglers and harvesters, are of key importance, and need to be understood.

Management regulations must also consider the implications for stakeholders. Commercial fishermen rely on catches to provide for their families just as farmers rely on crops. Commercial fishing can be a traditional trade passed down from generation to generation. Most commercial fishing is based in towns built around the fishing industry; regulation changes can impact an entire town's economy. Cuts in harvest quotas can have adverse effects on the ability of fishermen to compete with the tourism industry.

Effective management of fisheries includes involving stakeholders in the fishery. To do this successfully, stakeholders often need to feel empowered enough to make meaningful contributions to the management process.

Empowerment has a wide application but in this context it refers to a tool that gives people within the fishing communities an opportunity to shape their own future in order to cope with the impacts from large-scale commercial fishing, competition of resources, and other threats that impact fishing communities.

However, there are limits to empowerment in the fisheries management process. Empowerment maintains an involvement on the part of the state in fisheries management and no matter how empowered the other stakeholders are, the success of fisheries is not possible without the legislative powers, financial resources, educational support, and research the government provides.

This concept is not accepted by all, as some communities and individuals argue that the state should withdraw completely and let the local communities handle their own fishery management based on cultural traditions and established practices. Additionally, others have argued that co-management only empowers the wealthy and powerful which in turn solidifies and validates the already existing inequalities of fisheries management.

Empowerment working as a function of co-management, carried out correctly, will not only enable but it will authorize individuals and communities to make meaningful contributions to fisheries management. It is a mechanism that works in a loop, where an individual gains empowerment and encouragement from being a part of the group and the collective action is only successful because of its empowered individuals. In order to effectively and successfully use empowerment as co-management, it is imperative that study programs, guidelines, reading materials, manuals, and checklists are developed and incorporated into all fisheries management.

=== Corruption ===
Fisheries mismanagement is due, in part, to corruption. Corruption and bribery influence the number of fishing licenses that are distributed and to whom, as well as the negotiation of fishing access agreements. There is evidence of industrial fisheries corruption among the Small Island Developing States of the Pacific Ocean as well as the fisheries off the coast of West Africa. In small-scale fisheries, inspectors who are charged with regulating catch are bribed to give advance notice of surprise inspections and to relax enforcement standards. Some standards are not enforced at all due to bribery, while other infractions may result in smaller fines than mandated. Fishing gear seized during an investigation can also be returned in exchange for a bribe. Corruption of small-scale fisheries has been documented in South Africa and Lake Victoria.

=== Data quality ===
According to fisheries scientist Milo Adkison, the primary limitation in fisheries management decisions is the absence of quality data. Fisheries management decisions are often based on population models, but the models need quality data to be effective. He asserts that scientists and fishery managers would be better served with simpler models and improved data.

A key reliable source for summary statistics on fishery yields, employment and stocks is the FAO Fisheries Department.

=== Environmental impacts ===
The environmental impact of fishing includes issues such as the availability of fish, overfishing, fisheries, and fisheries management; as well as the impact of industrial fishing on other elements of the environment, such as bycatch. These issues are part of marine conservation, and are addressed in fisheries science programs.

Fisheries also have an evolutionary impact on species, especially related to the implementation of minimum landing sizes.

=== Dynamic impacts of climate change ===
In the past, changing climate has affected inland and offshore fisheries and such changes are likely to continue. From a fisheries perspective, the specific driving factors of climate change include rising water temperature, alterations in the hydrologic cycle, changes in nutrient fluxes, and relocation of spawning and nursery habitat. Further, changes in such factors would affect resources at all levels of biological organization, including the genetic, organism, population, and ecosystem levels. Understanding how these factors affect fisheries at a more nuanced level stand as challenges that fisheries scientists, across multiple fields, still need to face.

According to the FAO global assessment 47% of major basins important to inland fisheries were under low pressure, 40% under moderate pressure, and 13% under high pressure. Disaggregation by threat category revealed that the most widespread threat to inland fisheries globally is habitat degradation (54% of basins), followed by pollution (27%), climate and weather impacts (14%), and invasive species (in a small number of basins).

== Fisheries law ==
Fisheries law is an emerging and specialized area of law which includes the study and analysis of different fisheries management approaches, including seafood safety regulations and aquaculture regulations. Despite its importance, this area is rarely taught at law schools around the world, which leaves a vacuum of advocacy and research.

Fisheries legislation on a national level differs greatly between countries Fisheries may also be managed on an international level. One of the first laws enacted was the "United Nations Convention on the Law of the Sea of 10 December 1982 (LOS Convention)", which entered into force in 1994. This law set the foundation for all international agreements related to oceans that followed.

== Population dynamics ==
Population dynamics describes the growth and decline of a given fishery stock over time, as controlled by birth, death and migration. It is the basis for understanding changing fishery patterns and issues such as habitat destruction, predation and optimal harvesting rates. The population dynamics of fisheries has been traditionally used by fisheries scientists to determine sustainable yields.

The basic accounting relation for population dynamics is the BIDE model:

N_{1} = N_{0} + B − D + I − E

where N_{1} is the number of individuals at time 1, N_{0} is the number of individuals at time 0, B is the number of individuals born, D the number that died, I the number that immigrated, and E the number that emigrated between time 0 and time 1. While immigration and emigration can be present in wild fisheries, they are usually not measured.

Care is needed when applying population dynamics to real world fisheries. In the past, over-simplistic modelling, such as ignoring the size, age and reproductive status of the fish, focusing solely on a single species, ignoring bycatch and physical damage to the ecosystem, has accelerated the collapse of key stocks.

== Performance ==
The biomass of certain global fish stocks have been allowed to run down. The biomass of many species have now diminished to the point where it is no longer possible to sustainably catch the amount of fish that could be caught. According to a 2008 UN report, titled The Sunken Billions: The Economic Justification for Fisheries Reform, the world's fishing fleets incur a "$US 50 billion annual economic loss" through depleted stocks and poor fisheries management. The report, produced jointly by the World Bank and the UN Food and Agriculture Organization (FAO), asserts that half the world's fishing fleet could be scrapped with no change in catch.

"By improving governance of marine fisheries, society could capture a substantial part of this $50 billion annual economic loss. Through comprehensive reform, the fisheries sector could become a basis for economic growth and the creation of alternative livelihoods in many countries. At the same time, a nation's natural capital in the form of fish stocks could be greatly increased and the negative impacts of the fisheries on the marine environment reduced."

The most prominent failure of fisheries management in recent times has perhaps been the events that lead to the collapse of the Atlantic northwest cod fishery. More recently, the International Consortium of Investigative Journalists produced a series of journalistic investigations called Looting the seas. These detail investigations into the black market for bluefin tuna, the subsidies propping up the Spanish fishing industry, and the overfishing of the Chilean jack mackerel.

== See also ==
* All the Fish in the Sea: Maximum Sustainable Yield and the Failure of Fisheries Management
- Beverton–Holt model
- Bycatch
- Community supported fishery
- Fisheries Law Centre – Canada
- Fisheries and Marine Ecosystem Model Intercomparison Project
- Illegal, unreported and unregulated fishing
- List of harvested aquatic animals by weight
- Marine Protected Area
- Maximum sustainable yield
- North Pacific Fishery Management Council
- Regional Fisheries Management Organisation
- Sustainable fisheries

== Sources ==
This article incorporates text from a free content work. Licensed under CC BY 4.0 (license statement/permission). Text taken from The State of World Fisheries and Aquaculture 2026, Food and Agriculture Organization of the United Nations.
