= The Sunken Billions =

2008 study published by the World Bank and the Food and Agriculture Organization

The Sunken Billions: The Economic Justification for Fisheries Reform
- Author: Ragnar Arnason, Kieran Kelleher and Rolf Willmann
- Language: English
- Subject: World fisheries
- Publisher: Joint publication by the World Bank and the FAO
- Publication date: 2008
- Media type: Print
- ISBN: 978-0-8213-7790-1
- OCLC: 297146442
- Dewey Decimal: 338.3/727 22
- LC Class: SH328 .S79 2009

The Sunken Billions is a study jointly published in 2008 by the World Bank and by the Food and Agriculture Organization of the United Nations (FAO). The report shows that the difference between the potential and actual net economic benefits from marine fisheries is about USD 50 billion per year or some USD 2 trillion over the last three decades.

According to the report, "by improving governance of marine fisheries, society could capture a substantial part of this $50 billion annual economic loss. Through comprehensive reform, the fisheries sector could become a basis for economic growth and the creation of alternative livelihoods in many countries. At the same time, a nation's natural capital in the form of fish stocks could be greatly increased and the negative impacts of the fisheries on the marine environment reduced."

If fish stock were rebuilt, the current marine catch could be achieved with approximately half of the current global fishing effort. This illustrates the massive overcapacity of the global fleet. The excess competition over the limited fish resources results in declining productivity, economic inefficiency, and depressed fisher incomes.

A 2017 update of the report found that the difference between potential and actual economic benefits from global fisheries had grown to USD 83 billion per year.
