= National Fish Habitat Partnership =

American environmental conservation project

The National Fish Habitat Partnership (NFHP) is an attempt to conserve (protect, restore, enhance) freshwater, estuarine and marine waterways and fisheries in the United States. The National Fish Habitat Partnership was established as the National Fish Habitat Action Plan in 2006. The National Partnership is the umbrella for 20 Fish Habitat Partnerships established across the country that focus on regions, species or systems (specific examples include: Pacific Marine and Estuarine Partnership, the Eastern Brook Trout Joint Venture and the Reservoir Fisheries Habitat Partnership).

The Partnership has brought together fisheries professionals and other partners with a shared interest in restoring waterways and fisheries in the United States. This partnership is diverse and focused on achieving national awareness and obtaining resources for conserving fish habitats.

There are a variety of on-the-ground projects that are coordinated through the Action Plan every year. However the Action Plan has a yearly initiative, called 10 "Waters to Watch" that focuses on 10 conservation projects through partnerships under NFHP.

These waters represent a snapshot of this year's voluntary habitat conservation efforts in progress. These and other locally driven conservation projects are prioritized and implemented by regional Fish Habitat Partnerships that have formed throughout the country to implement the National Fish Habitat Action Plan. The objective of the Action Plan is to conserve freshwater, estuarine and marine habitats essential to the many fish and wildlife species that call these areas home.

The fish habitat partnerships, under the National Partnership, are composed of local and regional community groups, non-profit organizations, watershed groups, Native American tribes, local, state and federal agencies, and individuals all working to implement the National Fish Habitat Action Plan. Examples of conservation actions include planting stream-side vegetation important to sustaining the health of riparian and aquatic plants and animals, protecting and restoring fish passage and other voluntary measures that help avoid and minimize negative effects that could result from industrial and agriculture practices and livestock.

The 10 “Waters to Watch” are representative of freshwater to marine habitats across the country including rivers, lakes, reservoirs and estuaries that benefit through the conservation efforts of these Fish Habitat Partnerships formed under the Action Plan—a bold initiative implemented in 2006 to avoid and reverse persistent declines in our nation's aquatic habitats.

The initial Action Plan's 10 “Waters to Watch” list was unveiled in 2007. Since 2006, the U.S. Fish and Wildlife Service has provided over $56.5 million to conservation projects which leveraged at a 4:1 ratio to provide over $292.7 million in funding support for fish habitat conservation projects that improve angling and recreational opportunities across the nation (through 2023). NFHP assembles the collective expertise of federal, state, and non-governmental organizations to identify and prioritize conservation work to achieve significant benefits for fish and other aquatic resources for the American people.
