= Fisheries law =

Regulations regarding fishing activities

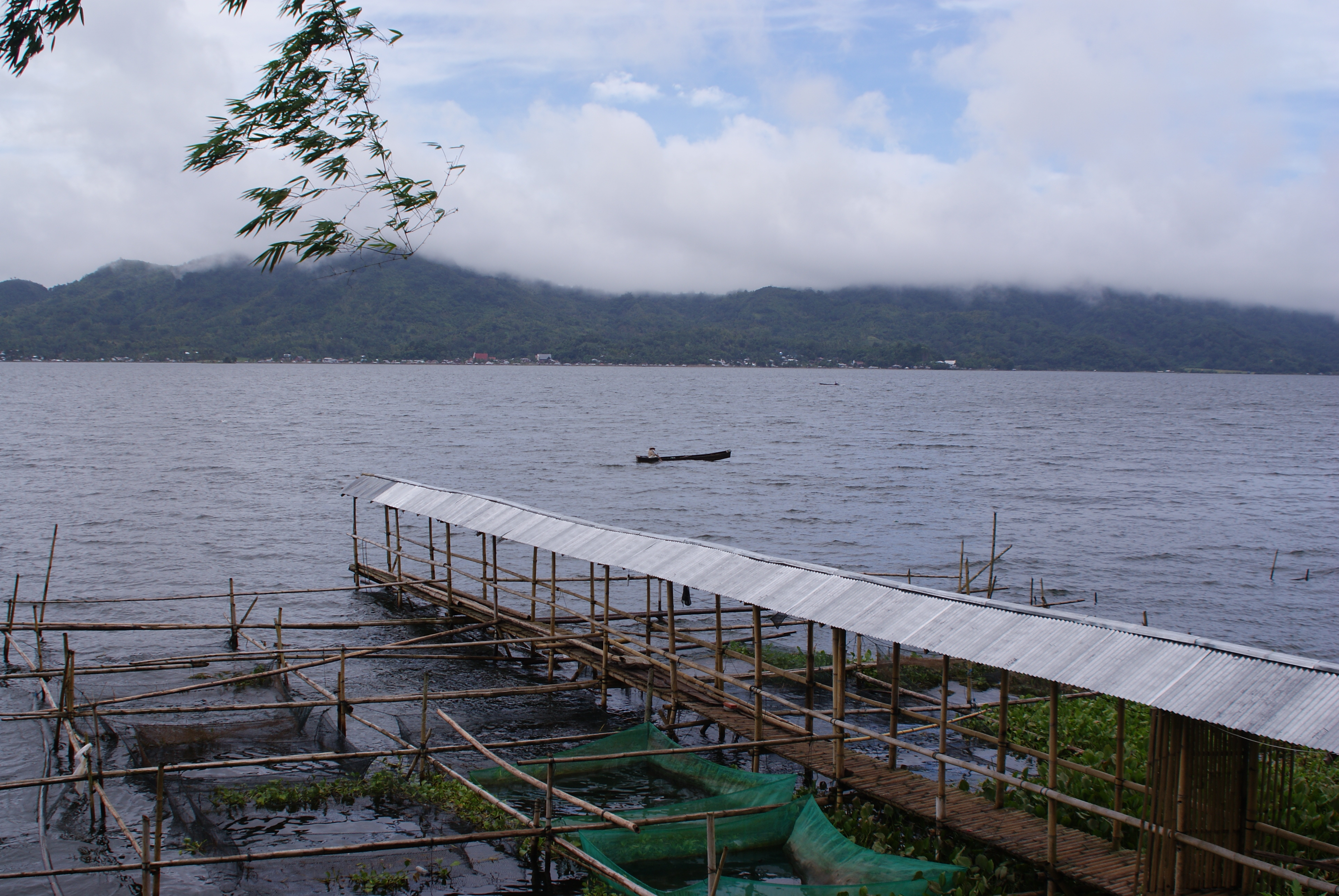
Fishery on Lake Tondano, Indonesia

Fisheries law is an emerging and specialized area of law. Fisheries law is the study and analysis of different fisheries management approaches such as catch shares e.g. individual transferable quotas; TURFs; and others. The study of fisheries law is important in order to craft policy guidelines that maximize sustainability and legal enforcement. This specific legal area is rarely taught at law schools around the world, which leaves a vacuum of advocacy and research. Fisheries law also takes into account international treaties and industry norms in order to analyze fisheries management regulations. In addition, fisheries law includes access to justice for small-scale fisheries and coastal and aboriginal communities and labor issues such as child labor laws, employment law, and family law.

Another important area of research covered in fisheries law is seafood safety. Each country, or region, around the world has a varying degree of seafood safety standards and regulations. These regulations can contain a large diversity of fisheries management schemes including quota or catch share systems. It is important to study seafood safety regulations around the world in order to craft policy guidelines from countries that have implemented effective schemes. Also, this body of research can identify areas of improvement for countries that have not yet been able to master efficient and effective seafood safety regulations.

Fisheries law also includes the study of aquaculture laws and regulations. Aquaculture, also known as aquafarming, is the farming of aquatic organisms, such as fish and aquatic plants. This body of research also encompasses animal feed regulations and requirements. It is important to regulate what feed is consumed by fish in order to prevent risks to human health and safety.

== Territorial Use Rights for Fishing (TURF) ==
Territorial Use Rights for Fishing (TURF) programs are a unique type of fishery law applicable for small scale fisheries. These community based programs allocate area based fishing privileges to groups or individuals with the goal of preventing overexploitation and unsustainable fishing. TURFs are usually granted to communities with longstanding traditions of sustainable fishing and are managed by the local fishermen. Although they are mainly community based, conservation guidelines are set at a federal level and governments have the authority to enforce TURFs. This form of management is used around the world, with the most successful examples being in Chile and Japan, and is modified to fit the social norms, needs, and goals of the community.

TURFs are being promoted as a potential tool for conserving biodiversity but mainly applicable to non migratory species. However, the exploitation of migratory species can be managed through cooperating neighboring TURFs. In Chile there are over 700 TURFs that create a network around 1100 square kilometers. As the fishermen rely on these areas for their livelihoods, this system incentivises them to manage these fisheries sustainably.

== Seafood safety regulations ==
=== U.S. labeling of genetically engineered salmon ===
On November 19, 2015, the U.S. Food and Drug Administration (FDA) approved AquaBounty Technologies' application to sell the AquAdvantage salmon to U.S. consumers. The possible introduction of genetically engineered salmon into the marketplace furthers discussion involving ethics, protection of the natural environment, international and domestic trade law, labeling practices, nutrition, and constitutional issues. As the FDA points out, nutrition labeling for raw produce (fruits and vegetables), fish, and genetically modified products, is voluntary. Under section 403(a)(1) of the Food, Drug, and Cosmetic Act ("FD&C Act"), a food is misbranded if its labeling is “false or misleading in any particular”. Section 201(n) of the FD&C Act provides that labeling is misleading if it fails to reveal facts that are material in light of representations made or suggested in the labeling. In regards to the AquAdvantage salmon, the FDA has stated:

"Based on our assessments of food derived from the AquAdvantage Salmon, we have determined that the term “Atlantic salmon” is the appropriate common or usual name for such food within the meaning of section 403(i) of the FD&C Act because AquAdvantage Salmon meets FDA's regulatory standard for Atlantic salmon (Ref. 10) and the composition and basic nature of food from AquAdvantage Salmon does not significantly differ from its non-GE counterpart—non-GE farm-raised Atlantic salmon. In addition, we have determined that food derived from AquAdvantage Salmon is as safe and nutritious as food from other farm-raised Atlantic salmon. For these reasons, we have concluded that there is no material difference between food derived from AquAdvantage Salmon and food derived from other non-GE, farm-raised Atlantic salmon that is required to be disclosed in the labeling of food derived from AquAdvantage Salmon under the relevant provisions of the FD&C Act, as explained above."

==== Canadian labeling of genetically engineered salmon ====
In 2014, Canada was a top-five producer of GM crops in the world, and is one of the largest players on the global market. Health Canada and the Canadian Food Inspection Agency ("CFIA") carry joint responsibility for federally food labeling policies in Canada under the Food and Drugs Act ("F&D Act"). Under the F&D Act, GMOs are defined as “novel foods”. A novel food is allowed to enter the Canadian marketplace only after it has passed an assessment undertaken by various stakeholders. Health Canada is responsible for deciding all health and safety labeling policies for food products, such as special dietary needs or GM products, and ensuring that the products are safe for consumption. The CFIA is responsible for the development of all non-health and safety food labeling regulations and policies and the enforcement of labeling legislation. Standards are set by the CFIA so that Canadian food labels are truthful and not misleading.

Subsection 5(1) of the F&D Act states that “no person shall label, package, treat, process, sell or advertise any food in a manner that is false, misleading or deceptive or is likely to create an erroneous impression regarding its character, value, quantity, composition, merit or safety”. Food must be labelled only if there are changes in the food such as problematic allergens or a significant nutrient or compositional change. Health Canada has not released an official statement concerning the AquAdvantage salmon, but does state on its website: “after twelve years of reviewing the safety of novel foods, Health Canada is not aware of any published scientific evidence demonstrating that novel foods are any less safe than traditional foods. The regulatory framework put in place by the federal government ensures that new and modified foods can be safely introduced in to the Canadian diet”.

== See also ==
- All the Fish in the Sea: Maximum Sustainable Yield and the Failure of Fisheries Management
- Fisheries Law Centre
- Fisheries management
- Fisheries science
- Illegal, unreported and unregulated fishing
- Overfishing
- Sustainable seafood
