= All the Fish in the Sea =

2011 book by Carmel Finley

All the Fish in the Sea: Maximum Sustainable Yield and the Failure of Fisheries Management
- Author: Carmel Finley
- Language: English
- Subject: environmental history; fisheries management; international law
- Published: 2011
- Publisher: University of Chicago Press
- Publication place: USA
- Media type: Print
- Pages: 224
- ISBN: 978-0226249667

All the Fish in the Sea: Maximum Sustainable Yield and the Failure of Fisheries Management is a 2011 book by Carmel Finley. The book argues that the policies for international fishing and whaling management were essentially locked in place by 1958, and that the United States played a large role in setting them. In the development of the international law covering fisheries, the US supported laws that would protect the US tuna and salmon fisheries while limiting the ability of other nations, and Japan in particular, to fish in US waters. The book thus ties fisheries management inseparably with Cold War politics.

In particular, Finley traces the development of the concept of maximum sustainable yield (MSY), arguing that MSY had no scientific basis and thus was a political and economic construct more than a scientific one. The "model did not represent the codification of quantitative, empirical evidence." Once instituted, instead of limiting fishing, MSY's assertion that underfishing wasted oceanic resources meant MSY "was not really a limit, but a goal to be reached," thus encouraging more fishing rather than less. The book engages the myth of the "Tragedy of the Commons" by demonstrating that governmental action and international policy led to overfishing, and not the self-interested actions of individual fishermen.

Finley argues that to achieve a sustainable future for fisheries, "we need to change the focus of management from estimating harvest to maintaining the population structure of fish stocks and their ecosystems." The book is also important as part of a movement to understand the oceans as a place with a history, rather than an unchanging void around which human history happens.
