= Fisheries co-management =

Fisheries co-management is flexible and cooperative management of the aquatic resources by the user groups and the government. The responsibility of the resource is shared between the user groups and the government, both the community and the government are involved during the decision making, implementation and enforcement processes.

== Types of co-management ==
Depending on the level of participation between the government and the community, five different types of co-management have been identified.

Instructive management is top-down management from the government. The government instructs the fishermen as to what laws and policies they are required to follow. Information is only shared with the community towards the end of the planning process.

In consultative management, the government consults with the community either through public hearings or advisory boards. The government is not required to implement any of the suggestions or comments into the policy. This consultation can also serve merely as a symbolic gesture rather than something that the government will necessarily implement.

In cooperative management, there is a degree of co-management of the resource by the government and the user group. The responsibility is shared by both parties. Certain areas such as access rules may be the responsibility of the user group.

In advisory management, users decide what decisions should be made and advise the government as such, the government than endorses the decision.

In informative management, the user group makes all of the decisions, and informs the government once they have decided.

== History of co-management ==
Co-management developed due to an attempt to improve the success of fisheries management as many of the aquatic resources risked being or were already depleted. The aim was to involve the community in the decision making process so that there may be an increased adherence to the regulations set by the government.

The top-down approach of fisheries management has frequently failed as it often goes against the community and their internal structure. Furthermore, the reason for the new governmental regulations and laws such as a decrease in total allowable catch (TAC) or catch per unit effort (CPUE) were often poorly understood by the community due to lack of education. Without proper enforcement or co-management the community would often disregard the law and continue as they previously were, often despite the detrimental impact this may have on the ocean.

== Difference between community management and co-management ==
Co-management is different from community management as the government plays an important part in the decision making process. In community management the laws are generally not enforced as governmental laws, rather a community guide and framework, this can make prosecution difficult. In co-management the user group and the government develop laws and regulations together and works towards implementing them as a unit. If community based management forms part of national legislation, or developmental plans than it is classified as co-management.

== Advantages of co-management ==
The community, specifically the users of the resource often possess knowledge that can aid the government in the decision making process, therefore co-management is the combination of scientific and traditional knowledge, this process ensures the best possible outcome. If the community is involved with and agrees on the new laws and decisions they are more likely to comply and may even aid in ensuring the new laws are enforced and maintained.

In dynamic environments conditions can vary at a rapid rate. The Arctic environment is a good example of a fast changing environment. If a good co-management structure is already implemented, it allows for quick decisions and implementations based on the required modification.

== Limitations of co-management ==
Co-management is known to be time consuming, as one must spend time collecting surveys and gaining trust within the community. Strong lines of communication between the government and the community is essential. Educating the community is often necessary so that more informed decisions can be made.

Many of the more isolated communities have a different language and communication can be slow and lack vital information. Existing laws and policies may need to be altered, or new ones created so as to allow for the structure of co-management. Conflicting views and economic versus conservation issues appear to be some of the main limitations to a successful co-management process. Lack of funding, data and resources are also main contributing factors to unsuccessful co-management. Co-management requires constant communication and effort, and therefore long term sustainability can be difficult.

Third party involvement such as non-governmental organizations (NGOs), or student groups, often forms an essential part of a successful co-management.
