= Peter Anthony Larkin =

- Born: 1924; Auckland, New Zealand
- Died: 10 July 1996 (aged 71); Canada
- Education: University of Saskatchewan, University of Oxford (PhD)
- Known for: Fisheries science, criticism of maximum sustainable yield
- Spouse: Lois
- Awards: Fellow of the Royal Society of Canada, Order of Canada, Order of British Columbia
- Scientific career
- Workplaces: University of British Columbia, Pacific Biological Station
- Doctoral advisor: Charles Elton

Peter Anthony Larkin, OC OBC FRSC (1924–1996) was a fisheries scientist who spent most of his career at the University of British Columbia. After his PhD at the Exeter College, Oxford, he moved to Canada as the Chief Fisheries Biologist of British Columbia, in a joint appointment between the provincial government and the University of British Columbia (UBC). At UBC, he later served as the Head of the Department of Zoology (1972–1975), as the Dean of Graduate Studies (1975–1984), and as the Vice President of Research (1986–1988). He authored some 160 scientific papers. He was also an admired teacher who won UBC's Master Teacher Award in 1971. Outside UBC, he served as the Director of the Pacific Biological Station at Nanaimo (1963–1966).

== Honours ==
Larkin was made a Fellow of the Royal Society of Canada in 1965. He was awarded the Queen Elizabeth II Silver Jubilee Medal in 1977, the Fry Medal of the Canadian Society of Zoologists in 1978, and the American Fisheries Society Award of Excellence in 1984. He also received the Order of Canada in 1995, and became a Member of the Order of British Columbia in June 1996.

== Legacy ==
"Larkin Lectures" are an approximately biannual series of lectures at the Institute for the Oceans and Fisheries, University of British Columbia. The series was initiated upon Larkin's retirement. The first lecture was given by Ray Beverton in 1995.

By late 2025, Google Scholar listed more than 1200 citations to Larkin's "An epitaph for the concept of maximum sustained yield", an essay based on his keynote lecture at the American Fisheries Society Annual Meeting in 1976.
