= Ecological yield =

Harvestable population growth in an ecosystem

Ecological yield is the harvestable population growth of an ecosystem. It is most commonly measured in forestry: sustainable forestry is defined as that which does not harvest more wood in a year than has grown in that year, within a given patch of forest.

However, the concept is also applicable to water, soil, and any other aspect of an ecosystem which can be both harvested and renewed—called renewable resources. The carrying capacity of an ecosystem is reduced over time if more than the amount which is "renewed" (refreshed or regrown or rebuilt) is consumed.

Ecosystem services analysis calculates the global yield of the Earth's biosphere to humans as a whole. This is said to be greater in size than the entire human economy. However, it is more than just yield, but also the natural processes that increase biodiversity and conserve habitat which result in the total value of these services. "Yield" of ecological commodities like wood or water, useful to humans, is only a part of it.

Very often an ecological yield in one place offsets an ecological load in another. Greenhouse gas released in one place, for instance, is fairly evenly distributed in the atmosphere, and so greenhouse gas control can be achieved by creating a carbon sink literally anywhere else.

== History ==
Some of the earliest academic papers on the subject were researching methods of sustainable fishing. Work of Russel et al. in 1931 observed in particular that "it appears that the ideal of a stabilised fishery yielding a constant maximum value is impractical." This work was mostly theoretical. Practical work would begin later, performed by industry and government agencies.

== Motivation ==
Ecological yield is a theoretical construct which aggregates information from several physically measurable quantities. It can be used to reason about other ecological indicators such as the footprint. It can also be used as a decision-making tool for governments and corporations.

=== Ecological footprint ===
The idea of ecological footprints is to measure the cost of economic activity in terms of the amount of ecologically productive land required to sustain it. Doing this accurately requires estimating how productive the land is; in other words, it requires measuring ecological yield. Conversely, one can extract ecological yield estimates from ecological footprint estimates.

=== Avoiding overexploitation ===
Corporations take out loans to buy equipment and land use rights. In order to pay back these loans, they must extract and sell resources from the land. If the corporation is ignorant of the yield of the land in question, then the debt instruments may demand a yield greater than the ecological capacity to renew. Green economics links this process with ecocide and poses solutions through monetary reform.

Even well-meaning corporations may systematically overestimate the yield of an ecosystem. In the case of multiple corporations bidding for land rights, an economic phenomenon known as the winner's curse causes the winning party to systematically overestimate the economic value of the land. Typically the economic value comes mostly from the ecological yield, in which case the corporation will overestimate that as well.

Another form of overestimation may come from generalizing data from other ecosystems. For example, the same species of fish in two different systems may have significantly different diets. If its diet in one region consists mostly of algae but in another region consists largely of smaller fish, then it will be more expensive for the latter ecosystem to produce the fish. Yield will be correspondingly lower in the second region. This example illustrates the need for ecosystem-specific study and monitoring in order to reason about ecological yield.

== Definition and properties ==
One may define yearly ecological yield for a fixed ecological product as follows: the yield is the amount of the product which may be removed from the ecosystem so that it is capable of recovering in one year. As a theoretical property of ecosystems, it cannot be measured directly but only estimated. Note that definition is sensitive to the time period which is allowed for recovery: the amount of product one can remove which regenerates over 3 years is not necessarily 3 times that which one can remove and regenerate over 1 year.

The yearly ecological yield is most useful because of the cycle of seasons and the commercial notion of the fiscal year. The seasons affect growth through temperature, sunlight, and rain, especially at the lowest trophic level. The fiscal year affects decisions by corporations to harvest resources: they may choose to harvest at or above ideal levels based on their need for short-term cash flow.

== Calculation techniques ==
=== Yield of the whole biosphere ===
In 1986, Vitousek et al. estimated that humans made use of 50 petagrams (50 billion tons) per year of biomass produced from photosynthesis. They also estimated that these 50 billion tons comprised between 20% and 40% of photosynthetic activity on earth. Separately, the Global Footprint Network estimates the total human footprint as 1.6 times the total biosphere. This implies that ecosystems are overexploited by a factor of 1.6 on average.

=== Theoretical prediction ===
In most biomes, the only form of primary production is photosynthesis. In other words, all new biomass can be traced back to photosynthetic plants and algae by a chain of predation. Therefore, one can predict the yield of one organism in an ecosystem as a function of the yield of its primary producers. When the biomass from prey is converted into biomass in its predator, some losses occur due to biological and thermodynamic inefficiency. The conversion rate is typically about 10%. In other words, 100 kg of plant matter may be converted into 10 kg of herbivores, which then may be converted to 1 kg of carnivores who exclusively eat herbivores. One can compute the trophic level of an organism as the weighted average of length of the predation chain from the organism to a primary producer. This trophic level determines an exponential multiplier to convert from primary producer biomass to the organism's biomass.

== Measurement techniques ==
=== Measuring forests ===
One can measure the amount of wood removed from a forest by asking the company who removed it; typically only one company has the logging rights to any given plot of land. In order to measure the regrowth of the forest in the coming year, typically one picks a representative subsample of the region and tracks every single tree in the subsample.

One such study measured growth in a section of the Tapajós National Forest for 13 years after logging activity. The loggers intended to harvest on a 30-year cycle. Logging in this region is restricted to mature trees measuring at least 45 cm DBH. Before logging, the region had somewhere between 150 m^{3} and 200 m^{3} of mature tree volume per hectare. Loggers removed about 75 m^{3} of tree per hectare, between 40% and 50% of the standing mass.

The authors show that growth rates in the region were elevated for up to 3 years after logging. After 13 years of growth, the basal area reached 75% of its original volume. They also show that logging makes substantial changes to the species composition and canopy structure of the forest. This introduces subjectivity into the notion of "recovery" for an ecosystem.

== See also ==
- Comprehensive outcome
- Full cost accounting
- Maximum sustainable yield
- Sustainability
- Uneconomic growth
