= Fishery =

Raising or harvesting fish

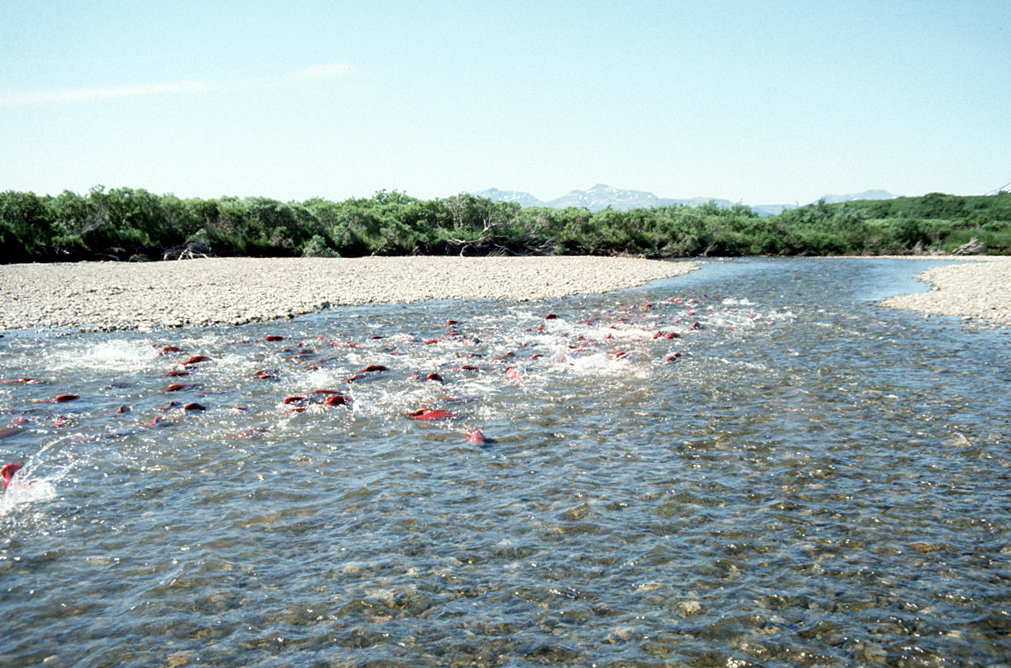
Salmon spawn in a salmon fishery within the Becharof Wilderness in Southwest Alaska.

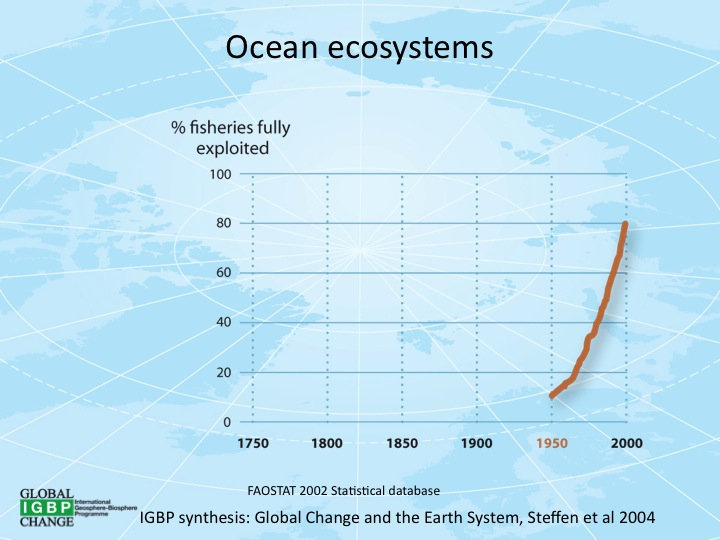
% of fisheries exploited over time

Fishery can mean either the enterprise of raising or harvesting fish and other aquatic life or, more commonly, the site where such enterprise takes place (a.k.a., fishing grounds). Commercial fisheries include wild fisheries and fish farms, both in freshwater waterbodies (about 10% of all catch) and the oceans (about 90%). About 500 million people worldwide are economically dependent on fisheries. 171 million tonnes of fish were produced in 2016, but overfishing is an increasing problem, causing declines in some populations.

Because of their economic and social importance, fisheries are governed by complex fisheries management practices and legal regimes that vary widely across countries. Historically, fisheries were treated with a "first-come, first-served" approach, but recent threats from human overfishing and environmental issues have required increased regulation of fisheries to prevent conflict and increase profitable economic activity on the fishery. Modern jurisdiction over fisheries is often established by a mix of international treaties and local laws.

Declining fish populations, marine pollution, and the destruction of important coastal ecosystems have introduced increasing uncertainty in important fisheries worldwide, threatening economic security and food security in many parts of the world. These challenges are further complicated by the changes in the ocean caused by climate change, which may extend the range of some fisheries while dramatically reducing the sustainability of other fisheries.

== Definitions ==
According to the FAO, "...a fishery is an activity leading to harvesting of fish. It may involve capture of wild fish or raising of fish through aquaculture." It is typically defined in terms of the "people involved, species or type of fish, area of water or seabed, method of fishing, class of boats, purpose of the activities or a combination of the foregoing features".

The definition often includes a combination of mammal and fish fishers in a region, the latter fishing for similar species with similar gear types. Some government and private organizations, especially those focusing on recreational fishing include in their definitions not only the fishers, but the fish and habitats upon which the fish depend.

=== The term fish ===
- In biology – the term fish is most strictly used to describe any aquatic vertebrate that has gills throughout life, and can also refer to those that have limbs (if any) or appendages in the shape of fish fins. Many types of aquatic animals commonly referred to as "fish" are not fish in this strict sense; examples include shellfish, cuttlefish, starfish, crayfish and jellyfish. In the strict sense, all vertebrates are cladistically fish, although colloquially "fish" is a paraphyletic term that only refers to non-tetrapod vertebrates. In earlier times, even biologists did not make any distinction — for instance, 16th century natural historians often classified seals, whales, amphibians, crocodiles and even hippopotamuses, as well as a host of marine invertebrates, as fish.
- In fisheries – the term fish is used as a collective term, and includes mollusks, crustaceans and any aquatic animals that are harvested for economic value.
- True fish – The biological definition of a fish (mentioned above) is sometimes called a "true fish", the vast majority of which are teleosts. True fish are also referred to as finfish or fin fish to distinguish them from other invertebrate aquatic life harvested in fisheries or aquaculture.

== Types ==
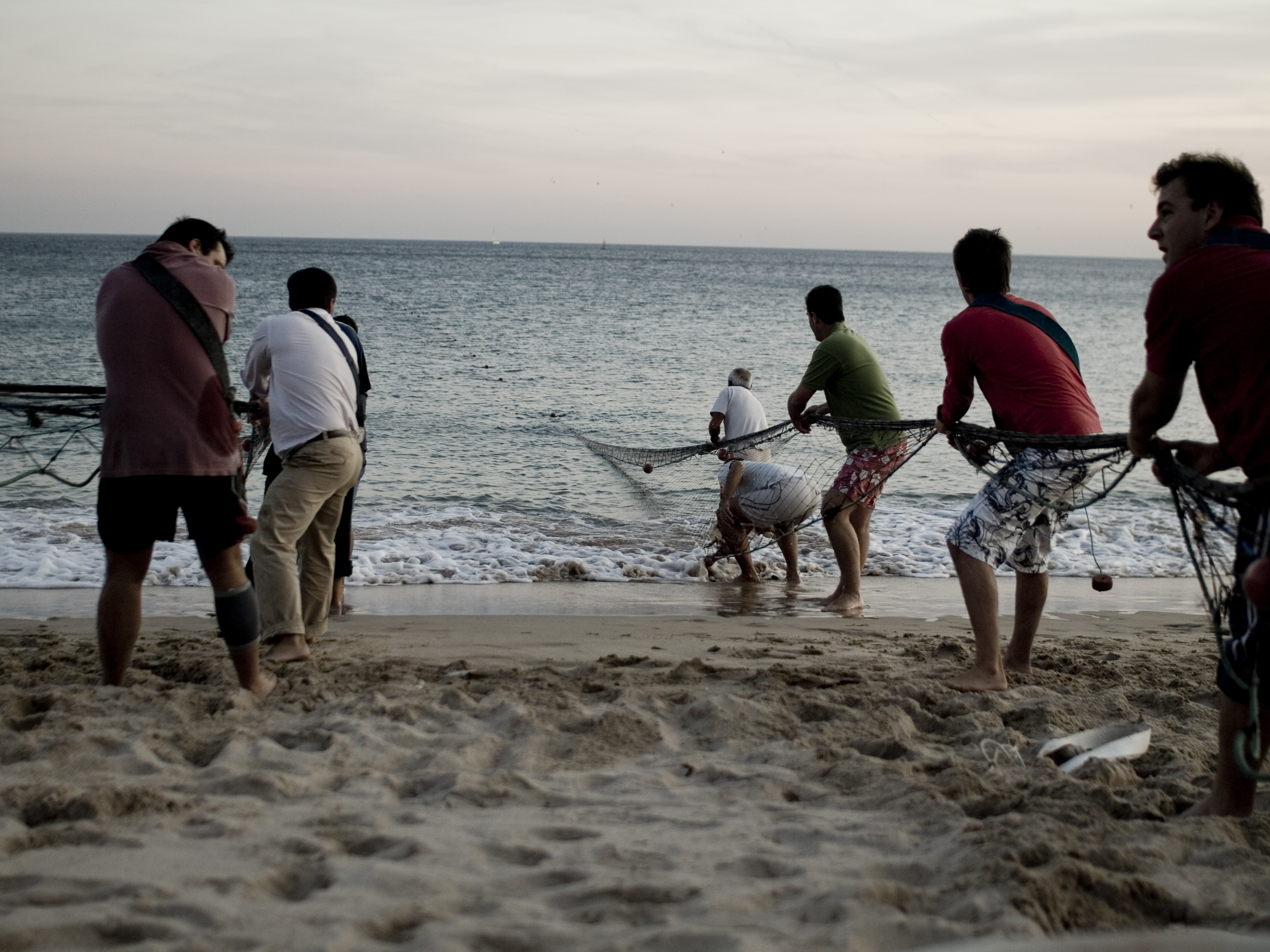
Fishermen in Sesimbra, Portugal

The fishing industry which harvests fish from fisheries can be divided into three main sectors: commercial, recreational or subsistence. They can be saltwater or freshwater, wild or farmed. About 85% of total marine fisheries production was finfish, mainly anchoveta (4.9 million tonnes), Alaska pollock (3.4 million tonnes) and skipjack tuna (3.1 million tonnes). Examples are the salmon fishery of Alaska, the cod fishery off the Lofoten islands, the tuna fishery of the Eastern Pacific, or the shrimp farm fisheries in China. Capture fisheries can be broadly classified as industrial scale, small-scale or artisanal, and recreational. Various options for processing the catch allow for a distinction whereby reduction fisheries can be distinguished from others.

Close to 90% of the world's fishery catches come from oceans and seas, as opposed to inland waters. These marine catches have remained relatively stable since the mid-nineties (between 80 and 86 million tonnes). Most marine fisheries are based near the coast. This is not only because harvesting from relatively shallow waters is easier than in the open ocean, but also because fish are much more abundant near the coastal shelf, due to the abundance of nutrients available there from coastal upwelling and land runoff. However, productive wild fisheries also exist in open oceans, particularly by seamounts, and inland in lakes and rivers.

Most fisheries are wild fisheries, but farmed fisheries are increasing. Farming can occur in coastal areas, such as with oyster farms, or the aquaculture of salmon, but more typically fish farming occurs inland, in lakes, ponds, tanks and other enclosures.

There are commercial fisheries worldwide for finfish, mollusks, crustaceans and echinoderms, and by extension, aquatic plants such as kelp. However, a very small number of species support the majority of the world's fisheries. Some of these species are herring, cod, anchovy, tuna, flounder, mullet, squid, shrimp, salmon, crab, lobster, oyster and scallops. All except these last four provided a worldwide catch of well over a million tonnes in 1999, with herring and sardines together providing a harvest of over 22 million metric tons in 1999. Many other species are harvested in smaller numbers. In 2024 The most traded aquatic animal products were finfish (68% of the total value), crustaceans (22%), and molluscs and other aquatic invertebrates (11%).

Share of employment in the primary sector of fisheries and aquaculture by sex, 2024

In 2022 small-scale fisheries contribute an estimated 40% of the global catch and support 90% of the capture fisheries workforce, with women representing 40%. 500 million people rely on small-scale fisheries for their livelihoods, including 53 million involved in subsistence fishing, of which 45% are women.

In 2022 inland fisheries produced 11.3 million tonnes, harvested mainly in Asia (63.4%) and Africa (29.4%), where they are important for food security. Lead producers were India (1.9 million tonnes), Bangladesh (1.3 million tonnes), China (1.2 million tonnes), Myanmar (0.9 million tonnes) and Indonesia (0.5 million tonnes). Inland fisheries figures are likely underestimated due to the difficulties most countries face in collecting these data.

== Economic importance ==
Sub-sector employing most people in the primary sector of fisheries and aquaculture by country or territory and share of national total, 2024

Directly or indirectly, the livelihood of over 500 million people in developing countries depends on fisheries and aquaculture. Overfishing, including the taking of fish beyond sustainable levels, is reducing fish stocks and employment in many world regions. It was estimated in 2014 that global fisheries were adding US$270 billion a year to global GDP, but by full implementation of sustainable fishing, that figure could rise by as much as US$50 billion. In 2022 77% of the global workforce was in Asia, 16% in Africa and 5% in Latin America and the Caribbean.

In addition to commercial and subsistence fishing, recreational (sport) fishing is popular and economically important in many regions.

=== Production ===
Global capture fisheries and aquaculture production reported by FAO, 1990–2030

Total fish production in 2016 reached an all-time high of 171 million tonnes, of which 88% was utilized for direct human consumption, thanks to relatively stable capture fisheries production, reduced wastage and continued aquaculture growth. This production resulted in a record-high per capita consumption of 20.3 kg in 2016. Since 1961 the annual global growth in fish consumption has been twice as high as population growth. While annual growth of aquaculture has declined in recent years, significant double-digit growth is still recorded in some countries, particularly in Africa and Asia.

FAO predicted in 2018 the following major trends for the period up to 2030:

- World fish production, consumption and trade are expected to increase, but with a growth rate that will slow over time.
- Despite reduced capture fisheries production in China, world capture fisheries production is projected to increase slightly through increased production in other areas if resources are properly managed. Expanding world aquaculture production, although growing more slowly than in the past, is anticipated to fill the supply–demand gap.
- Prices will all increase in nominal terms while declining in real terms, although remaining high.
- Food fish supply will increase in all regions, while per capita fish consumption is expected to decline in Africa, which raises concerns in terms of food security.
- Trade in fish and fish products is expected to increase more slowly than in the past decade, but the share of fish production that is exported is projected to remain stable.

In 2024, capture fisheries production remained stable at 92 million tonnes (excluding algae), continuing its long-term pattern of fluctuation within the range of 86 and 94 million tonnes since the late 1980s. Marine capture fisheries remain the main source of aquatic animal production, with about 80 million tonnes harvested, accounting for 41% of total aquatic animal production, while Inland fisheries reached a record 12.3 million tonnes,.

== Management ==
The management of fisheries is broadly defined as the set of tasks which guide vested parties and managers in the optimal use of aquatic renewable resources, primarily fish. According to the Food and Agriculture Organization of the United Nations (FAO) in the 2001 Guidebook to Fisheries Management there is currently "no clear and generally accepted definitions of fisheries management". Instead, the authors use a working definition, such that fisheries management is:

The integrated process of information gathering, analysis, planning, consultation, decision-making, allocation of resources and formulation and implementation, with necessary law enforcement to ensure environmental compliance, of regulations or rules which govern fisheries activities in order to ensure the continued productivity of the resources and the accomplishment of other fisheries objectives.

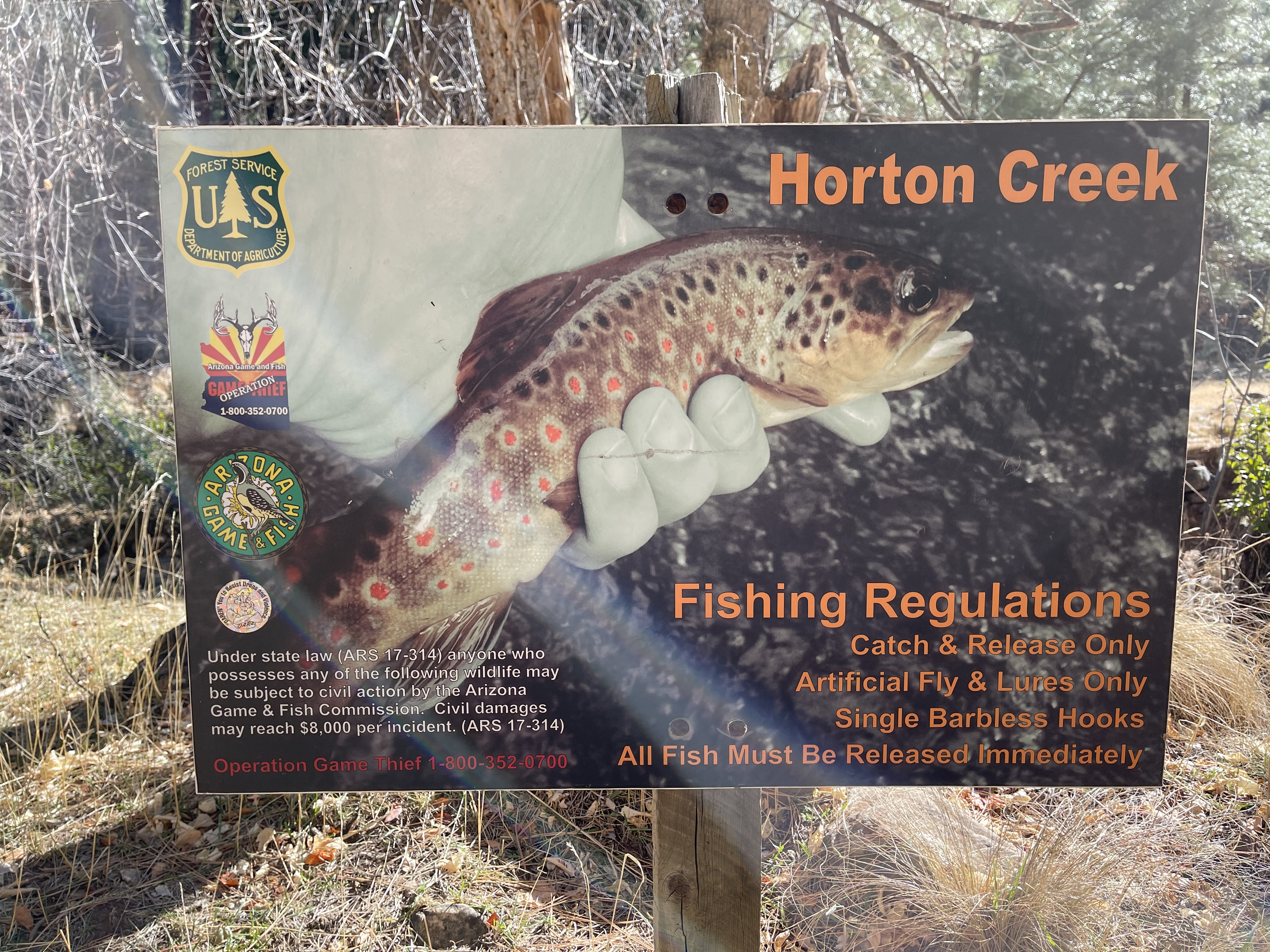
A signboard listing fishing regulations at Horton Creek, Arizona

The goal of fisheries management is to produce sustainable biological, environmental and socioeconomic benefits from renewable aquatic resources. Wild fisheries are classified as renewable when the organisms of interest (e.g., fish, shellfish, amphibians, reptiles and marine mammals) produce an annual biological surplus that with judicious management can be harvested without reducing future productivity. Fishery management employs activities that protect fishery resources so sustainable exploitation is possible, drawing on fisheries science and possibly including the precautionary principle.

Modern fisheries management is often referred to as a governmental system of appropriate environmental management rules based on defined objectives and a mix of management means to implement the rules, which are put in place by a system of monitoring control and surveillance. An ecosystem approach to fisheries management has started to become a more relevant and practical way to manage fisheries. Current scientific consensus is oriented towards ecosystem-based fisheries management (EBFM) as the most viable approach for achieving the goal of balancing human needs, ensuring the longevity of ecosystem services, and mitigating adverse ecological impacts. Today, EBFM is a more comprehensive approach to fisheries management which focuses on achieving ecological health and productivity, as opposed to traditional management techniques which focus on isolated species.

Recent research on large river basins highlights the importance of maintaining high native species richness, particularly by preventing the overexploitation of piscivorous fish. This preserves a "living shield" (biotic resistance) that naturally prevents the establishment of new invasive species. For invaders that are already naturalized, eradication is often impractical and ecologically damaging; instead, rational management recommends non-intervention and the justified commercial exploitation of the new resource, alongside strict protection of native predator populations.

=== Global goals ===
International attention to these issues has been captured in Sustainable Development Goal 14 "Life Below Water" which sets goals for international policy focused on preserving coastal ecosystems and supporting more sustainable economic practices for coastal communities, including in their fishery and aquaculture practices.

== Law ==
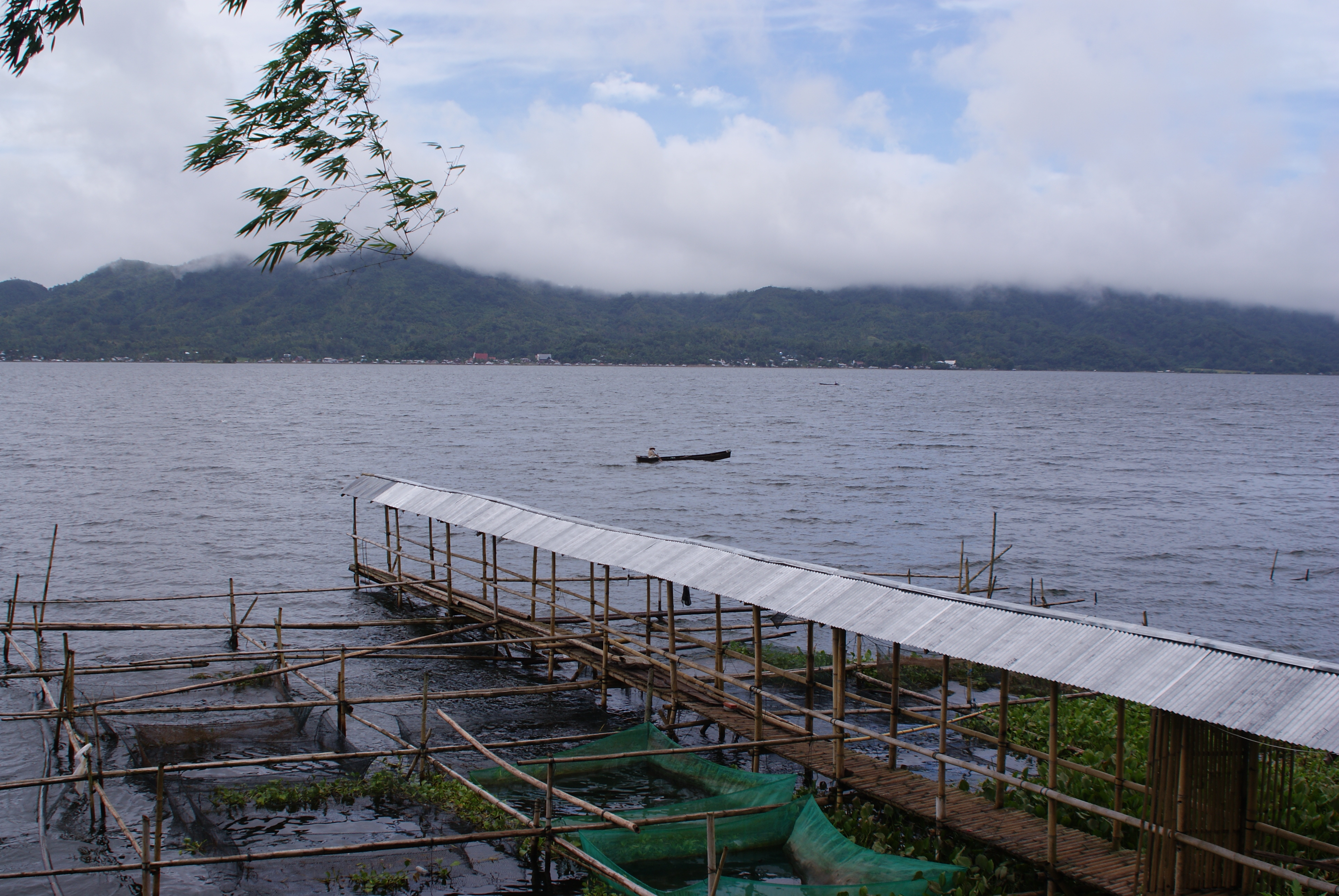
Fishery on Lake Tondano, Indonesia

Fisheries law is an emerging and specialized area of law. Fisheries law is the study and analysis of different fisheries management approaches such as catch shares e.g. individual transferable quotas; TURFs; and others. The study of fisheries law is important in order to craft policy guidelines that maximize sustainability and legal enforcement. This specific legal area is rarely taught at law schools around the world, which leaves a vacuum of advocacy and research. Fisheries law also takes into account international treaties and industry norms in order to analyze fisheries management regulations. In addition, fisheries law includes access to justice for small-scale fisheries and coastal and aboriginal communities and labor issues such as child labor laws, employment law, and family law.

Another important area of research covered in fisheries law is seafood safety. Each country, or region, around the world has a varying degree of seafood safety standards and regulations. These regulations can contain a large diversity of fisheries management schemes including quota or catch share systems. It is important to study seafood safety regulations around the world in order to craft policy guidelines from countries that have implemented effective schemes. Also, this body of research can identify areas of improvement for countries that have not yet been able to master efficient and effective seafood safety regulations.

Fisheries law also includes the study of aquaculture laws and regulations. Aquaculture, also known as aquafarming, is the farming of aquatic organisms, such as fish and aquatic plants. This body of research also encompasses animal feed regulations and requirements. It is important to regulate what feed is consumed by fish in order to prevent risks to human health and safety.

== Environmental issues ==
Greenhouse gas emissions (kg / kg edible weight) of wild-caught and farmed seafood products

The environmental impact of fishing includes issues such as the availability of fish, overfishing, fisheries, and fisheries management; as well as the impact of industrial fishing on other elements of the environment, such as bycatch. These issues are part of marine conservation, and are addressed in fisheries science programs. According to a 2019 FAO report, global production of fish, crustaceans, molluscs and other aquatic animals has continued to grow and reached 172.6 million tonnes in 2017, with an increase of 4.1 percent compared with 2016. There is a growing gap between the supply of fish and demand, due in part to world population growth.

Fishing and pollution from fishing are the largest contributors to the decline in ocean health and water quality. Ghost nets, or nets abandoned in the ocean, are made of plastic and nylon and do not decompose, wreaking extreme havoc on the wildlife and ecosystems they interrupt. Overfishing and destruction of marine ecosystems may have a significant impact on other aspects of the environment such as seabird populations. On top of the overfishing, there is a seafood shortage resulting from the mass amounts of seafood waste, as well as the microplastics that are polluting the seafood consumed by the public. The latter is largely caused by plastic-made fishing gear like drift nets and longlining equipment that are worn down by use, lost or thrown away.

The journal Science published a four-year study in November 2006, which predicted that, at prevailing trends, the world would run out of wild-caught seafood in 2048. The scientists stated that the decline was a result of overfishing, pollution and other environmental factors that were reducing the population of fisheries at the same time as their ecosystems were being annihilated. Many countries, such as Tonga, the United States, Australia and Bahamas, and international management bodies have taken steps to appropriately manage marine resources.

Mean greenhouse gas emissions of different fisheries
Food types	Greenhouse gas emissions (g CO_{2}-C_{eq} per g protein)
Recirculating aquaculture	30
Trawling fishery	26
Non-recirculating aquaculture	12
Non-trawling fishery	8.6

Reefs are also being destroyed by overfishing because of the huge nets that are dragged along the ocean floor while trawling. Many corals are being destroyed and, as a consequence, the ecological niche of many species is at stake. Food and Agriculture Organization (FAO) estimates 30−70% of the waste and by-products generated by fisheries and aquaculture can be transformed for food or non-food usages (e.g. silage, biofuel, fertilizer) or converted into high‐value products (e.g. collagen, gelatin, bioactive peptides, chitin, chitosan). In 2024 the percentage of assessed stocks classified as biologically sustainable by the Food and Agriculture Organization (FAO) declined to 62.4% in 2023, from 64.5% in 2021, with wide differences across regions and species groups.

=== Climate change ===
Fisheries are affected by climate change in many ways: marine aquatic ecosystems are being affected by rising ocean temperatures, ocean acidification and ocean deoxygenation, while freshwater ecosystems are being impacted by changes in water temperature, water flow, and fish habitat loss. These effects vary in the context of each fishery. Climate change is modifying fish distributions and the productivity of marine and freshwater species. Climate change is expected to lead to significant changes in the availability and trade of fish products. The geopolitical and economic consequences will be significant, especially for the countries most dependent on the sector. The biggest decreases in maximum catch potential can be expected in the tropics, mostly in the South Pacific regions.

The impacts of climate change on ocean systems has impacts on the sustainability of fisheries and aquaculture, on the livelihoods of the communities that depend on fisheries, and on the ability of the oceans to capture and store carbon (biological pump). The effect of sea level rise means that coastal fishing communities are significantly impacted by climate change, while changing rainfall patterns and water use impact on inland freshwater fisheries and aquaculture. Increased risks of floods, diseases, parasites and harmful algal blooms are climate change impacts on aquaculture which can lead to losses of production and infrastructure.

== See also ==
- Fisheries co-management
- Fisheries science
- National Fish Habitat Initiative
- Ocean fisheries
- Population dynamics of fisheries
- Regional Fisheries Management Organisation
- Sea Fish Industry Authority
- Tanka people
