= Rent extraction =

- Initiator: Fred S. Mcchesney
- Introduced: 1987
- Origin: Rent Extraction and Rent Creation in the Economic Theory of Regulation

Rent extraction

Rent extraction is a notion formulated by American jurist Fred S. Mcchesney (1948–2017) in his 1987 essay Rent Extraction and Rent Creation in the Economic Theory of Regulation. It refers to the phenomenon by which entrepreneurial politicians take advantage of the threat of implementing new regulations to obtain political support from interest groups that want to be free from regulatory interference. This strategy is in particular useful when a group has made specific capital investments that can be expropriated in the political process.

"Rent extraction" means the ability of lawmakers to squeeze payments (i.e. "rents") in some form in exchange for favorable legislation. The term presents a conscious, welfare maximization strategy by individual statespersons. It emerges when political decision makers derive benefits from the rents they generate. And the beneficiaries of rent extraction can also be local governments at all levels and the private individuals.

Rent extraction, together with rent creation and rent seeking, determines the extent and distribution of rents. However, the three are distinct and rent extraction is arguably the most important of the three, since the other two are ultimately motivated by rent extraction.

Hillman and Katz found that there was a collision between the benefits of lower and upper level officials when it came to rent extraction. The more rent extraction that occurs at the lower levels of governance, the less the upper officials can "harvest". As a result, officials at the upper levels of rent collection have an incentive to adopt rules and regulations that limit the types of rent collection allowed by lower-level officials.

== See also ==
- Rent-seeking
- Rent-setting
- Economic rent
