= Optimum sustainable yield =

Profit-maximizing level of ecological yield

In population ecology and economics, optimum sustainable yield is the level of effort (LOE) that maximizes the difference between total revenue and total cost. Or, where marginal revenue equals marginal cost. This level of effort maximizes the economic profit, or rent, of the resource being used. It usually corresponds to an effort level lower than that of maximum sustainable yield.

In environmental science, optimum sustainable yield is the largest economical yield of a renewable resource achievable over a long time period without decreasing the ability of the population or its environment to support the continuation of this level of yield, and enables an ecosystem to have a high aesthetic value. This concept is widely used specifically in the management of fisheries, where surplus fish are removed so the population stays at its carrying capacity. This allows the most fish to be harvested while still maintaining maximum population growth.
