= Environmental impact of fishing =

Greenhouse gas emissions (kg / kg edible weight) of wild-caught and farmed seafood products

The environmental impact of fishing includes issues such as the availability of fish, overfishing, fisheries, and fisheries management; as well as the impact of industrial fishing on other elements of the environment, such as bycatch. These issues are part of marine conservation, and are addressed in fisheries science programs. According to a 2019 FAO report, global production of fish, crustaceans, molluscs and other aquatic animals has continued to grow and reached 172.6 million tonnes in 2017, with an increase of 4.1 percent compared with 2016. There is a growing gap between the supply of fish and demand, due in part to world population growth.

Fishing and pollution from fishing are the largest contributors to the decline in ocean health and water quality. Ghost nets, or nets abandoned in the ocean, are made of plastic and nylon and do not decompose, wreaking extreme havoc on the wildlife and ecosystems they interrupt. Overfishing and destruction of marine ecosystems may have a significant impact on other aspects of the environment such as seabird populations. On top of the overfishing, there is a seafood shortage resulting from the mass amounts of seafood waste, as well as the microplastics that are polluting the seafood consumed by the public. The latter is largely caused by plastic-made fishing gear like drift nets and longlining equipment that are worn down by use, lost or thrown away.

The journal Science published a four-year study in November 2006, which predicted that, at prevailing trends, the world would run out of wild-caught seafood in 2048. The scientists stated that the decline was a result of overfishing, pollution and other environmental factors that were reducing the population of fisheries at the same time as their ecosystems were being annihilated. Many countries, such as Tonga, the United States, Australia and Bahamas, and international management bodies have taken steps to appropriately manage marine resources.

Mean greenhouse gas emissions of different fisheries
Food types	Greenhouse gas emissions (g CO_{2}-C_{eq} per g protein)
Recirculating aquaculture	30
Trawling fishery	26
Non-recirculating aquaculture	12
Non-trawling fishery	8.6

Reefs are also being destroyed by overfishing because of the huge nets that are dragged along the ocean floor while trawling. Many corals are being destroyed and, as a consequence, the ecological niche of many species is at stake. Food and Agriculture Organization (FAO) estimates 30−70% of the waste and by-products generated by fisheries and aquaculture can be transformed for food or non-food usages (e.g. silage, biofuel, fertilizer) or converted into high‐value products (e.g. collagen, gelatin, bioactive peptides, chitin, chitosan). In 2024 the percentage of assessed stocks classified as biologically sustainable by the Food and Agriculture Organization (FAO) declined to 62.4% in 2023, from 64.5% in 2021, with wide differences across regions and species groups.

== Effects on marine habitat ==
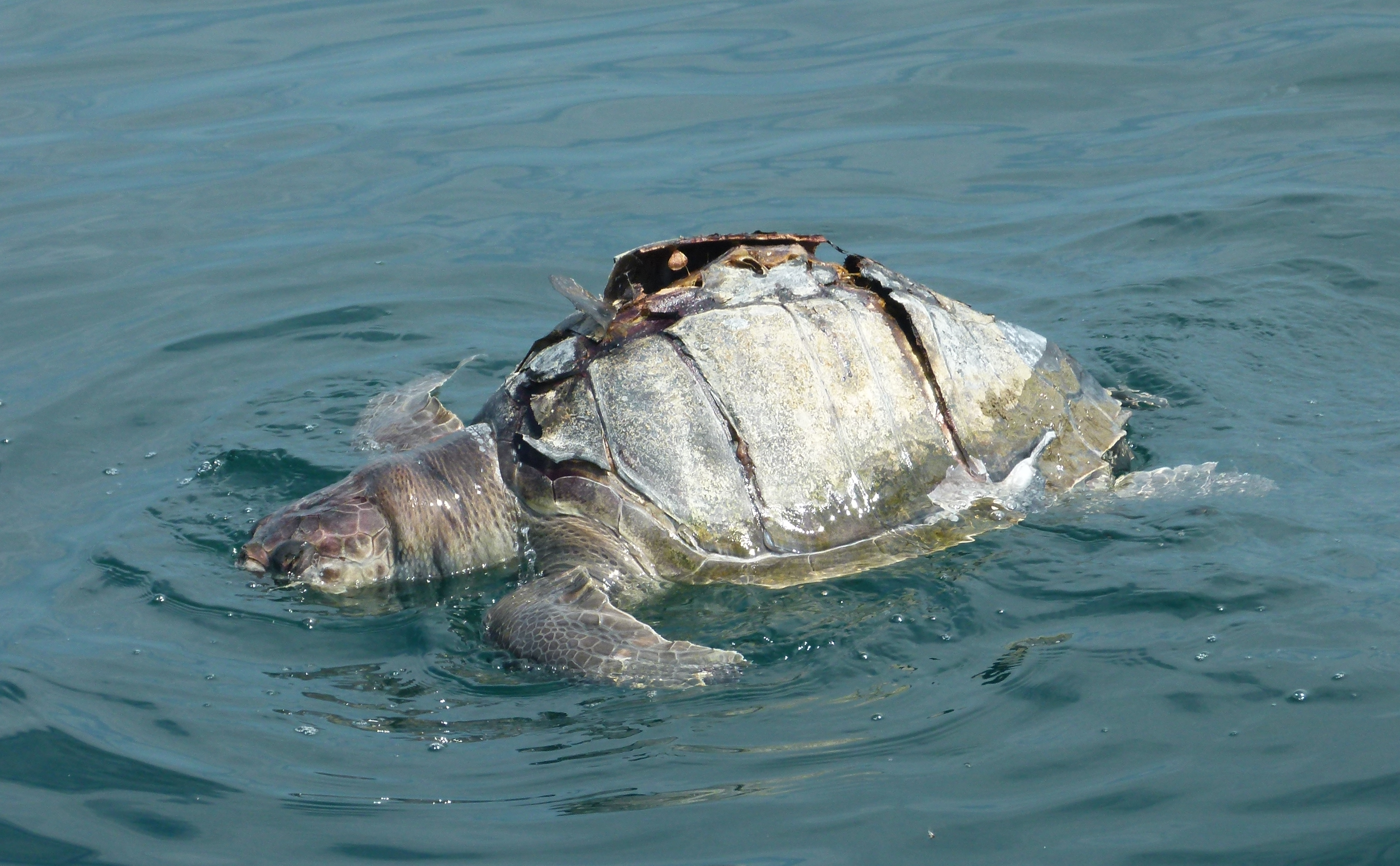
A sea turtle killed by a boat propeller

Some fishing techniques cause habitat destruction. Blast fishing and cyanide fishing, which are illegal in many places, harm surrounding habitats. Blast fishing refers to the practice of using explosives to capture fish. Cyanide fishing refers to the practice of using cyanide to stun fish for collection. These two practices are commonly used for the aquarium trade and the live fish food trade. These practices are destructive because they impact the habitat that the reef fish live on after the fish have been removed. Bottom trawling, the practice of pulling a fishing net along the sea bottom behind trawlers, removes around 5 to 25% of an area's seabed life on a single run. This method of fishing tends to cause a lot of bycatch. A study of La Fonera Canyon compared trawled versus non-trawled areas. The results show that areas at 500 to 2000 meters depth that is non-trawled have more biodiversity, biomass, and variation of meiofauna than trawled areas at 500 meters depth. Most of the impacts are due to commercial fishing practices. A 2005 report of the UN Millennium Project, commissioned by UN Secretary-General Kofi Annan, recommended the elimination of bottom trawling on the high seas by 2006 to protect seamounts and other ecologically sensitive habitats. This was not done.

In mid-October 2006, United States President George W. Bush joined other world leaders calling for a moratorium on deep-sea trawling. The practice has shown to often have harmful effects on sea habitat and, hence, on fish populations, yet no further action was taken (Vivek). The sea animal's aquatic ecosystem may also collapse due to the destruction of the food chain.

Additionally, ghost fishing is a major threat due to capture fisheries. Ghost fishing occurs when a net, such as a gill net or trawl, is lost or discarded at sea and drifts within the oceans, and can still act to capture marine organisms. According to the Food and Agriculture Organization's 1995 Code of Conduct for Responsible Fisheries, member states should act to minimize the amount of lost and abandoned gear and work to minimize ghost fishing.

== Overfishing ==
Overfishing is the removal of aquatic animals—primarily fish—from a body of water at a rate greater than that the species can replenish its population naturally (i.e., the overexploitation of a region's existing fish stocks), resulting in the species becoming increasingly underpopulated in that area. Excessive fishing practices can occur in water bodies of any size, from ponds, wetlands, rivers, and lakes to seas and oceans, and can result in resource depletion, reduced biological growth rates, and low biomass levels. Sustained overfishing, especially industrial-scale commercial fishing, can lead to critical depensation, where the fish population is no longer able to sustain itself, resulting in extirpation or even extinction of species. Some forms of overfishing, such as the overfishing of sharks, have led to the disruption of entire marine ecosystems. Types of overfishing include growth overfishing, recruitment overfishing, and ecosystem overfishing. Overfishing not only causes negative impacts on biodiversity and ecosystem functioning, but also reduces fish production, which subsequently leads to negative social and economic consequences.

The ability of a fishery to recover from overfishing depends on whether its overall carrying capacity and the variety of ecological conditions are suitable for the recovery. Dramatic changes in species composition can result in an ecosystem shift, where other equilibrium energy flows involve species compositions different from those that had been present before the depletion of the original fish stock. For example, once trout have been overfished, carp might exploit the change in competitive equilibria and take over in a way that makes it impossible for the trout to re-establish a breeding population.

Since the growth of global fishing enterprises after the 1950s, intensive fishing has spread from a few concentrated areas to encompass nearly all fisheries. The scraping of the ocean floor in bottom dragging is devastating to coral, sponges and other slower-growing benthic species that do not recover quickly, and that provide a habitat for commercial fisheries species. This destruction alters the functioning of the ecosystem and can permanently alter species' composition and biodiversity. Bycatch, the collateral capture of unintended species in the course of fishing, is typically returned to the ocean only to die from injuries or exposure. Bycatch represents about a quarter of all marine catch. In the case of shrimp capture, the mass of bycatch is five times larger than that of the shrimp caught.

A report by FAO in 2020 stated that "in 2017, 34 percent of the fish stocks of the world's marine fisheries were classified as overfished". Mitigation options include government regulation, removal of subsidies, minimizing fishing impact, aquaculture, and consumer awareness. In 2024 the percentage of assessed stocks classified as biologically sustainable by the Food and Agriculture Organization (FAO) declined to 62.4% in 2023, from 64.5% in 2021, with wide differences across regions and species groups.

== Ecological disruption ==
Percentage of biologically sustainable and unsustainable fishery stocks by FAO major fishing area and selected species group, 2023

Overfishing can result in the over-exploitation of marine ecosystem services. Fishing can cause several negative physiological and psychological effects for fish populations including increased stress levels and bodily injuries resulting from lodged fish hooks. Often, when this threshold is crossed, hysteresis may occur within the environment. More specifically, some ecological disturbances observed within the Black Sea marine ecosystem resulted from a combination of overfishing and various other related human activities which adversely affected the marine environment and ecosystem. Ecological disruption can also occur due to the overfishing of critical fish species such as the tilefish and grouper fish, which can be referred to as ecosystem-engineers.

Fishing may disrupt food webs by targeting specific, in-demand species. There might be too much fishing of prey species such as sardines and anchovies, thus reducing the food supply for the predators. Disrupting these types of wasp-waist species may have effects throughout the ecosystem. It may also cause the increase of prey species when the target fishes are predator species, such as salmon and tuna.

Overfishing and pollution of the oceans also affect their carbon storage ability and thus contribute to the climate crisis. Carbon stored in seafloor sediments risk release by bottom-trawling fishing.

== Fisheries-induced evolution ==
Fisheries-induced evolution or evolutionary impact of fishing is the various evolutionary effects of the fishing pressure, such as on size or growth. It is mainly caused by selective fishing on size, bigger fish being more frequently caught. Moreover, policy of minimum landing size, based on the idea that it spares young fishes, have many negative impacts on a population by selecting slow growth individuals.

== Bycatch ==
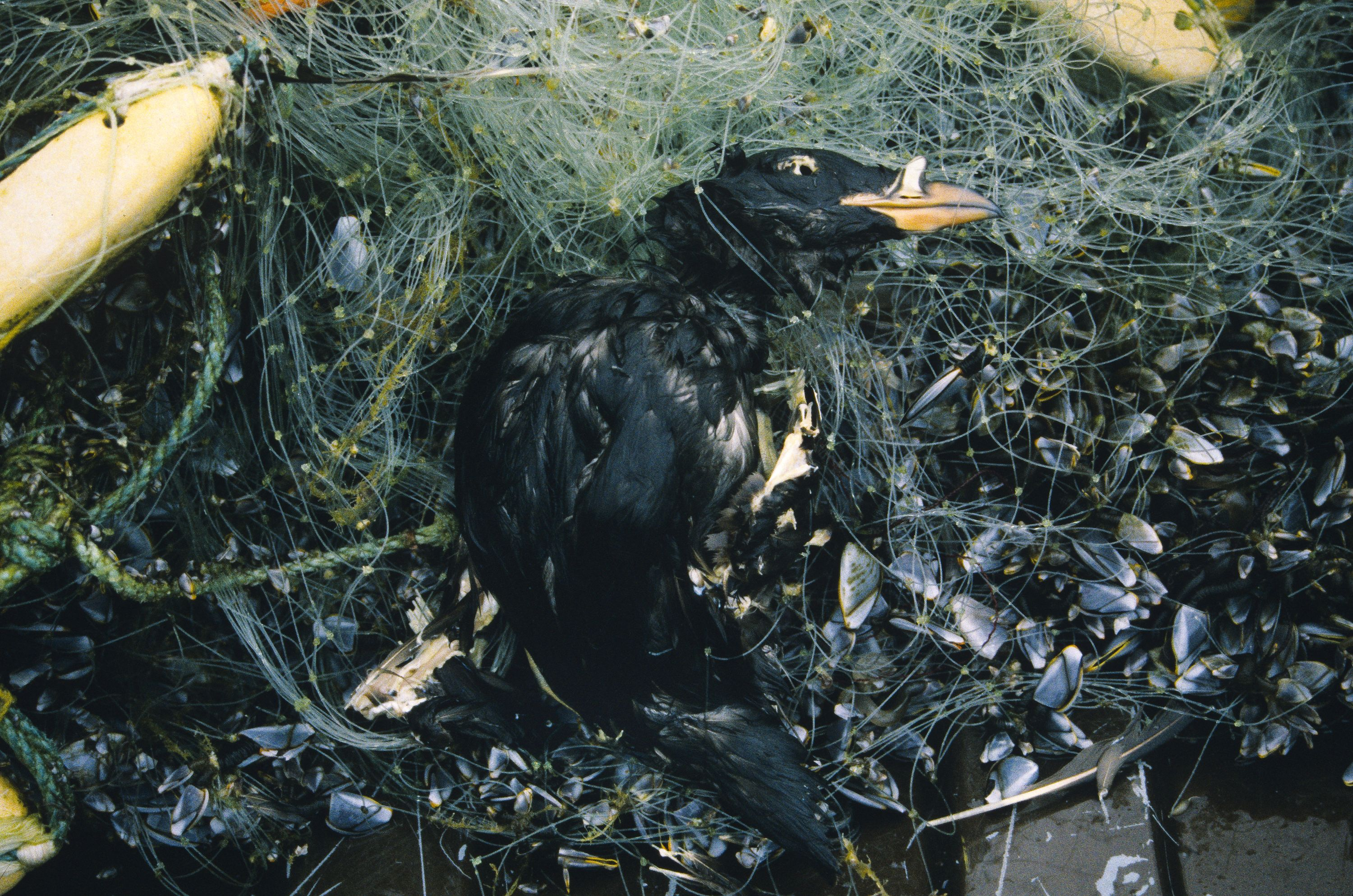
Bird unintentionally caught as bycatch in drift net

Bycatch is the portion of the catch that is not the target species. Unintentional bycatch occurs when fishing gear with poor selectivity is used. These are either kept to be sold or discarded. In some instances the discarded portion is known as discards. Even sports fisherman discard a lot of non-target and target fish on the bank while fishing. For every pound of the target species caught, up to 5 pounds of unintended marine species are caught and discarded as bycatch. As many as 40% (63 billion pounds) of fish caught globally every year are discarded, and as many as 650,000 whales, dolphins and seals are killed every year by fishing vessels.

== Shark finning and culling ==
Shark finning is the act of removing fins from sharks and discarding the rest of the shark. The sharks are often still alive when discarded, but without their fins. Unable to swim effectively, they sink to the bottom of the ocean and die of suffocation or are eaten by other predators. Though studies suggest that 73 million sharks are finned each year, scientists have noted that the numbers may actually be higher, with roughly 100 million sharks being killed by finning each year. The deaths of millions of sharks has caused catastrophic damage to the marine ecosystem.

Shark culling is the killing of sharks in government-run "shark control" programs. These programs exist to reduce the risk of shark attacks — however, environmentalists say that they do not reduce the risk of shark attacks; they also say that shark culling harms the marine ecosystem. Shark culling currently occurs in New South Wales, Queensland, KwaZulu-Natal and Réunion. Queensland's "shark control" program killed roughly 50,000 sharks between 1962 and 2018 — Queensland's program uses lethal devices such as shark nets and drum lines. Thousands of other animals, such as turtles and dolphins, have been killed in Queensland as bycatch. Queensland's shark culling program has been called "outdated, cruel and ineffective". The shark culling program in New South Wales (which uses nets) has killed thousands of sharks, turtles, dolphins and whales. KwaZulu-Natal's shark culling program killed more than 33,000 sharks in a 30-year period.

== Marine debris ==
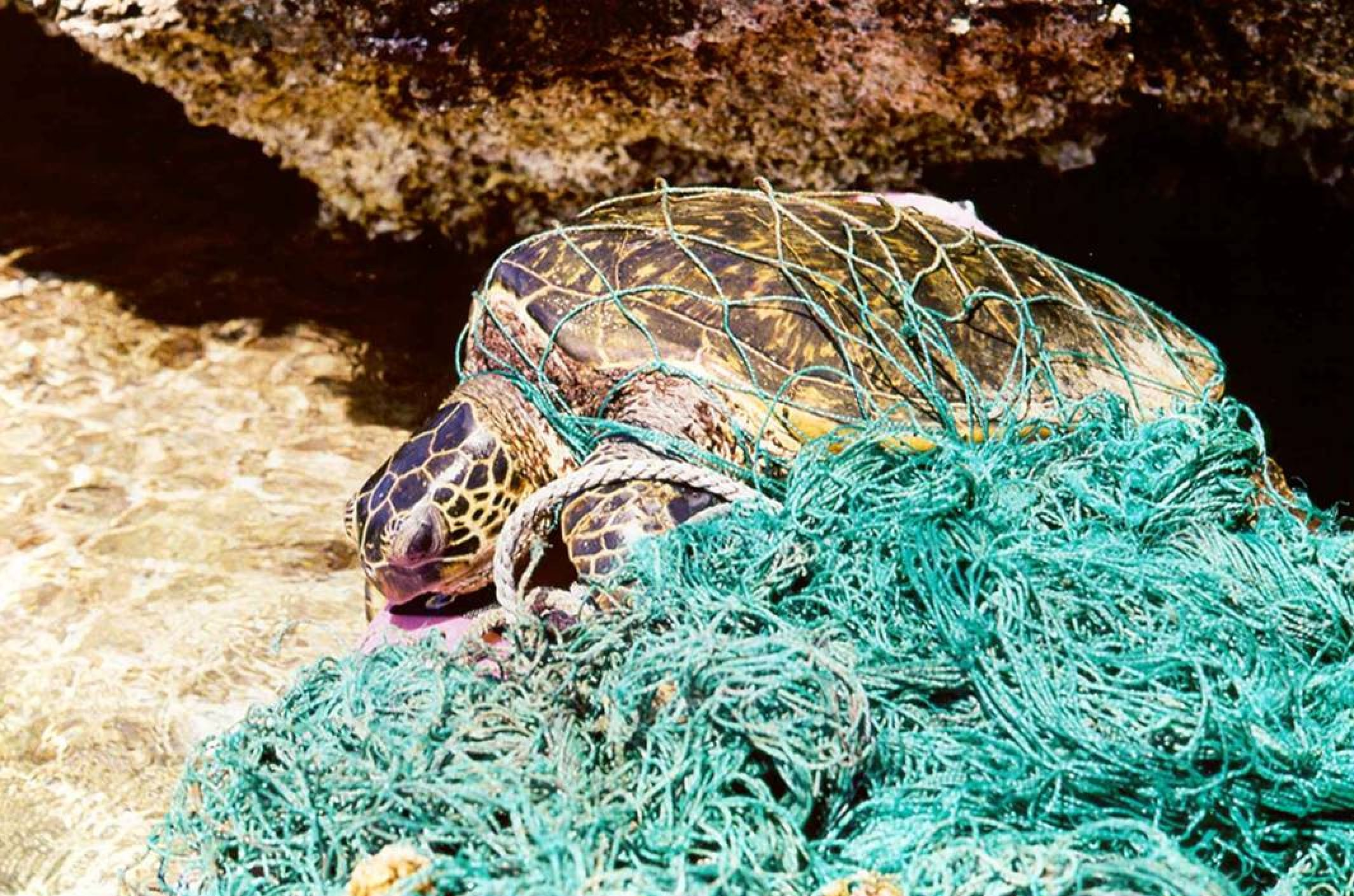
Turtle entangled in marine debris

Recent research has shown that, by mass, fishing debris, such as buoys, lines, and nets, account for more than two-thirds of large plastic debris found in the oceans. In the Great Pacific Garbage Patch, fishing nets alone comprise at least 46% of the debris. Similarly, fishing debris has been shown to be a major source of plastic debris found on the shores of Korea. Marine life interacts with debris in two ways: either through entanglement (where debris entangles or entraps animals), or ingestion of the debris (either intentionally or accidentally). Both are harmful to the animal. Marine debris consisting of old fishing nets or trawls can often be linked to phenomena such as ghost fishing, wherein the netting debris, referred to as ghost nets, continues to entangle and capture fish. A study performed in southern Japan on octopuses noted that there was an estimated mortality rate of 212,000–505,000 octopuses per year within the area's fishing grounds, due in large part to ghost fishing. Tracking garbage and monitoring the logistics of human waste disposal, especially waste materials primarily associated with fishing, is one method to reduce marine debris. Using technological or mechanical innovations such as marine debris-clearing drones can further serve to reduce the amount of debris within oceans.

== Recreational fishing impacts ==
Recreational fishing is fishing done for sport or competition, whereas commercial fishing is catching seafood, often in mass quantities, for profit. Both can have different environmental impacts when it comes to fishing.

Though many assume recreational fishing does not have a large impact on fish, it actually accounts for almost a quarter of the fish caught in the United States, many of those being commercially valuable fish. Recreational fishing has its biggest impact on marine debris, overfishing, and fish mortality. Release mortality in recreational fisheries is the same as the impacts of bycatch in commercial fisheries. Studies have suggested that improving recreational fisheries management on a global scale could generate substantial social benefits of the same scale as reforming commercial fisheries.

=== Catch and Release ===
Catch and release fishing involves several practices that aim to reduce the negative environmental impacts of fishing. This refers to the duration, timing, and type of hook used during angling. To increase the effectiveness of catch and release fishing and mitigate its negative impacts, species-specific guidelines are required. These guidelines help tailor specific rules and regulations to specific species of fish in relation to their locations and mating and migration cycles. A metastudy in 2005 found that the average catch and release mortality rate was 18%, but varied greatly by species. While catch-and-release fishing has been widely used in recreational fishing, it is also beneficial for maintaining fish populations at a stable level for commercial fisheries to receive social and economic benefits. Combining catch and release fishing with biotelemetry data collection methods allows for researchers to study the biological effects of catch and release fishing on fish in order to better suit future conservation efforts and remedies.

== Countermeasures ==
=== Fisheries management ===
Much of the scientific community blames the mismanagement of fisheries for global collapses of fish populations. One method for increasing fish population numbers and reduce the severity of adverse environmental impacts and ecological disturbances is the use of fisheries management systems. Traditional fisheries management techniques can signify restricting certain types of fishing gear, reducing the total allowable catch, decreasing fishing efforts as a whole, implementing catch shares, involving communities with conservation efforts and defining areas closed to fishing. In order to implement any of these tactics on a fishery, ample data collection and statistical analysis are necessary.

Whether or not traditional fisheries management techniques are effective at restoring fish populations is often seen as a debate in the fisheries science community. However, there are a few factors to consider when evaluating the efficiency of fisheries management techniques. For example, large fisheries are more likely to be managed whereas small fisheries are commonly left unassessed and unmanaged. Unassessed fisheries are thought to represent about 80% of all fisheries. Some researchers believe that the stability and health of these unassessed fisheries are worse than the assessed fisheries, justifying the premise that traditional fisheries management techniques are ineffective. However, many scientists highlight that those fish populations are declining due to the fact that they have not been assessed and therefore adequate fisheries management techniques have not been applied. Further, most of the assessed fisheries (and hence managed fisheries) are biased towards large populations and commercially lucrative species. Assessments are often performed by nations that are able to afford the assessment process and implementation of fisheries management tools.

Determining sustainable harvest quotas are another example of a traditional fisheries management technique. However, the intention behind harvest quotas are often not a big enough incentive for fishermen to adhere to them. This is because limiting individual harvests often leads to a smaller profit for the fleet. Since these fishermen are not guaranteed compensation for part of the quota, they tend to resolve to the method of harvesting as many fish as possible. This competitiveness among fishermen and their fleets leads to the increased use of harmful fishing practices, extremely large harvests, periods of reduced stocks and the eventual collapse of the fishery. To eliminate the need for such competitiveness among fishermen, many scientists suggest the implementation of rights-based fisheries reforms. This can be done by granting Individual Transferable Quotas (ITQs) or catch shares, a set portion of a scientifically calculated total allowable catch, to individual fishermen, communities and cooperatives. ITQs incentivize fishermen because the value of catch shares grows as the stability of the fishery improves.

It is estimated that around 27% of global fisheries were classified as collapsed in 2003 and that by 2048, 100% of global fisheries would be considered collapsed. In a study compiling data from 11,135 fisheries around the world (some ITQ-managed, some non-ITQ managed), the potential impact of ITQs on fisheries if they all implemented a rights-based management approach since 1970 was estimated. In that case, the percentage of collapsed fisheries in 2003 was projected as 9%, which remained fairly stable for the rest of the experiment's time period. Despite the projected success of the ITQ-managed fisheries, the results of this study may not be a completely accurate representation of the true impact of right-based management. This is due to the fact that the data used to create these results was limited to one type of catch share and that the true effects of ITQs can only be assessed if social, ecological and economic factors were also considered.

In some cases, changing fishing gear can have an impact on habitat destruction. In an experiment with three different types of gears used for oyster harvesting, compared to dredging and tonging, hand-harvesting by divers resulted in the collection of 25-32% more oysters within the same amount of time. In terms of habitat conservation, the reef habitat sustained damage to its height during the use of all three gear types. Specifically, dredging cut the height of the reef by 34%, tonging by 23% and diver hand-harvesting by 6%.

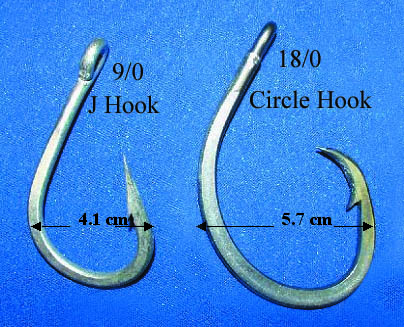
A 9/0 J hook and a 18/0 circle hook.

Opting for a different hook design or bait type can make fishing practices less dangerous and lead to less bycatch. Using 18/0 circle hooks and mackerel for bait has been shown to greatly reduce the amount of leatherback sea turtles and loggerheads caught as bycatch. The use of circle hooks was shown to decrease the amount of hooks ingested by loggerheads. Further, with the target species being swordfish, the use of both circle hooks and mackerel for bait had no negative impact on the amount of swordfish caught.

Ecosystem-based management of fisheries is another method used for fish conservation and impact remediation. Instead of solely focusing conservation efforts on a single species of marine life, ecosystem-based management is used across various species of fish within an environment. To improve the adoption of these types of fisheries management, it is important to reduce barriers to entry for management scenarios in order to make these methods more accessible to fisheries globally.

Many governments and intergovernmental bodies have implemented fisheries management policies designed to curb the environmental impact of fishing. Fishing conservation aims to control the human activities that may completely decrease a fish stock or washout an entire aquatic environment. These laws include the quotas on the total catch of particular species in a fishery, effort quotas (e.g., number of days at sea), the limits on the number of vessels allowed in specific areas, and the imposition of seasonal restrictions on fishing.

=== Fish farming ===
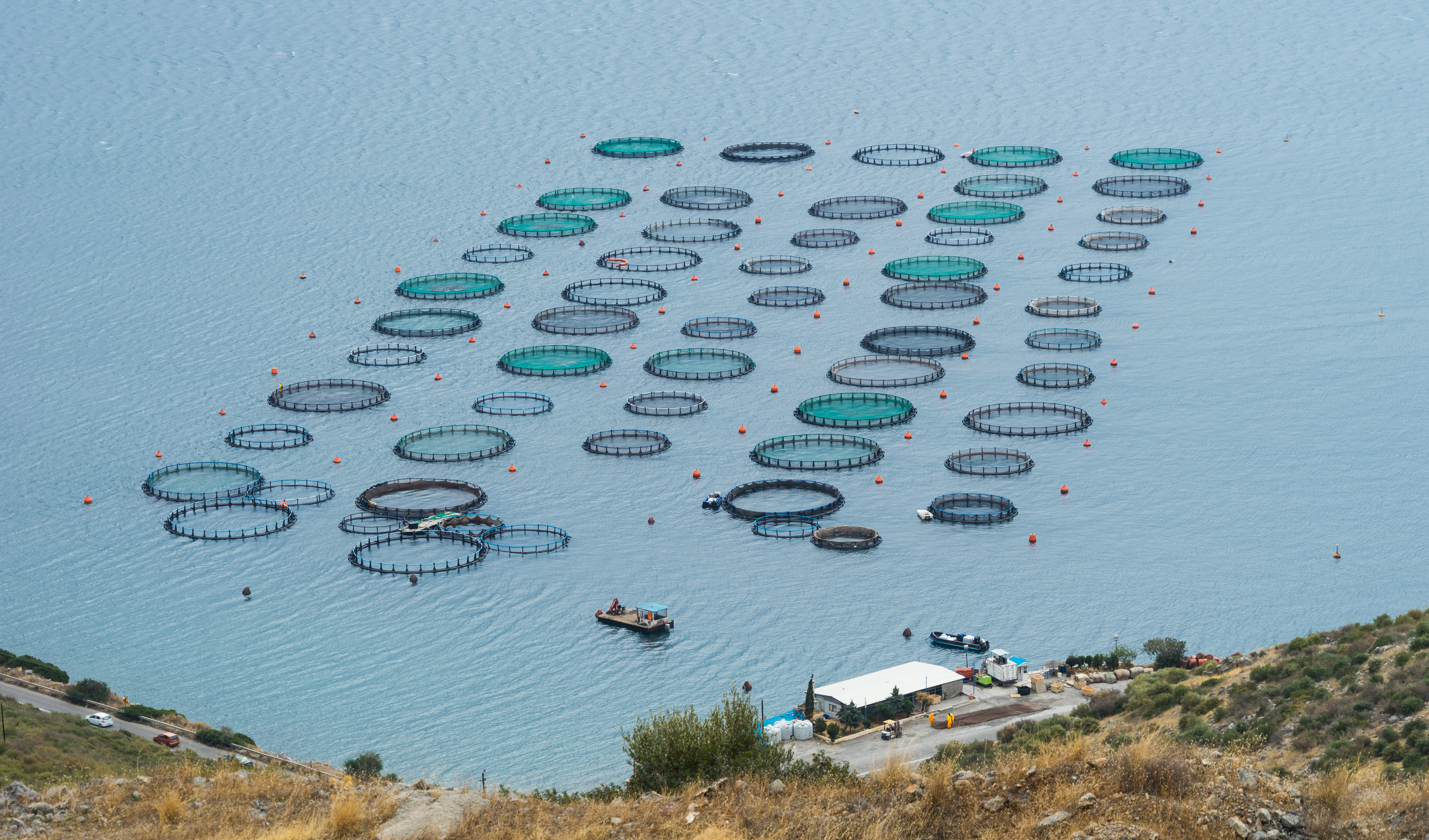
Fish farm near Amarynthos Euboea Greece

Fish farming, aquaculture, or pisciculture, has been proposed as a more sustainable alternative or as a supplement to the traditional capture of wild fish. Fish farms are usually located in coastal waters and can involve netpens or cages that are anchored to the sediment at the bottom. As many fisheries have been heavily depleted, farming profitable and commonly consumed fish species is a method used to supply larger quantities of seafood for human consumption. This is especially the case for marine aquatic species such as salmon and shrimp and freshwater species such as carp and tilapia. In fact, approximately 40% of seafood consumed by humans is produced in fish farms.

Even though fish farming does not require a lot of space, they can have significant ecological impacts on the fish around them and marine resources. For instance, low trophic level, wild caught fish like anchovies, capelin and sardines are used to feed marine and freshwater farmed fish. Farmed marine fish species, usually carnivores, tend require more fishmeal and fish oil to thrive. On the opposite end, farmed freshwater fish, usually herbivores and omnivores, are not as dependent on them. This can be problematic because the small fish used for the production of fishmeal also serve as food for predators living outside the enclosures.

It is not uncommon for farmed fish to escape their enclosures. This can lead to the introduction of non-native species to a new environment. Farmed species breeding with wild fish species of the same type, called interbreeding, can cause offspring to have reduced fitness.

=== Marine reserves ===
Marine reserves serve to foster both environmental protection and marine wildlife safety. The reserves themselves are established via environmental protection plans or policies which designate a specific marine environment as protected. Coral reefs are one of the many examples which involve the application of marine reserves in establishing marine protected areas. There have also been marine reserve initiatives located in the United States, Caribbean, Philippines and Egypt. To mitigate the negative environmental impacts of fishing within marine environments, marine reserves are intended to create, enhance and re-introduce biodiversity within the area. As a result, the primary benefits arising from the implementation of this type of management effort include positive impacts towards habitat protection and species conservation.

== See also ==
- Finless Foods
- Population dynamics of fisheries
- List of harvested aquatic animals by weight
- Sustainable seafood
- Individual fishing quota
- Destructive fishing practices
- Environmental effects of meat production
- Human impact on the environment

== Sources ==
This article incorporates text from a free content work. Licensed under CC BY 4.0 (license statement/permission). Text taken from The State of World Fisheries and Aquaculture 2026, Food and Agriculture Organization of the United Nations.
