= Panglima Laôt =

Tribal Leader

Panglima La'ôt (Acehnese language: sea commander) is a tribal leader in a fishing community in Aceh province of Indonesia. He constitutes to organise Hukôm Adat La'ôt (customary maritime law). The law, which is developed upon the basis of Islamic Law and is not set out in writing, consists of a system of marine laws and regulations; in this regard, the sea is a source of work and welfare. It varies in detail depending on local conventions and the type of fishing gear. Keeping pace with development in fisheries, the custom was developing more rapidly than other custom laws and covered most general procedures, including the leader selection process, organisational structure, role and duty, etc.

The custom was established by the Sultan Iskandar Muda (1607–1637) of Acehnese Sultanate Samudera Pasai to maintain maritime affairs under Sultan mandate, i.e. regulating fishing seasons and rights as well as resolving local conflicts. The custom subsisted in local fishing community during Dutch colonial (1904–1942), Japanese occupation (1942–1945) and Indonesian government (1945 to date) eras.

== History ==
Hukôm Adat Laôt law initially recognised during the era of Sultan Iskandar Muda (1607–1637) of Acehnese Aceh Darussalam Sultanate. Historically, Panglima Laôt was a domain of Sultan sovereignty over maritime zones in Aceh. In making decision, he should coordinate with uleebalang (local authority officer). Historically it was a hereditary position; however, some of Panglima Laôts erected under the consideration of seniority and experience in maritime issues.

== Political recognition ==
Initially Panglima Laôt has been officially recognised by the constitutional law in 1977, when Head of Aceh Besar District recognised rural organisational structure (District Letter No. 1/1977), which included Panglima Laôt. However, the letter did not describe any detail on its role and function. Provincial Regulation No. 2/1990 (Establishment and Development of Local Culture, Community Conventions and Customary Institutions in Aceh) recognised Panglima Laôt as the responsible party in maintaining local customs in marine (capture) fisheries. Role of Panglima Laôt confirmed in the latter Provincial Regulation No. 7/2000 (Application of Traditional Living in Aceh). From constitutional laws and administration perspectives, Panglima Laôt sits beyond the official structures; however, he maintains coordination with local authorities (governor, district head/mayor or sub district head).

== Compliance and enforcement ==
According to the later provincial Panglima Laôt convention in 2002, Panglima Laôt institutionally structured to Panglima Lhôk, Chik Laôt and Provincial Panglima Laôt. Panglima Lhôk supervises a lhôk, a unique management unit in Hukôm Adat Laôt based on estuary or bay where the fishing boats are harboured. He is also responsible to settle disputes and conflicts at lhôk level. The unsolved conflicts will be promoted to the Chik Laôt in district level. Currently there are 147 Panglima Lhôks. Chik Laôt has authority over a district/city. Historically the highest rank Panglima Laôt, he is responsible to reconcile unsolved conflicts issued by Panglima Lhôk or conflicts involving two lhôks or more. Currently there are 17 Chik Laôts. The recent update of the system is the establishment of provincial Panglima Laôt in the 2002 Panglima Laôt convention. The post is the latest highest rank in the custom. However, his role is only political, mainly maintaining coordination all Panglima Laôts in Aceh as well as represents fishermen interest with provincial and/or national governments.

== Authority and Territory ==
Previously, Panglima Lhôk was responsible to determine taboo in fishing, prohibition in fishing gear deployment in a certain area, prohibition coastal environmental destruction as well impose penalties against violators. His other roles were determining fishing grounds based on fishing gear, permitting outsiders fishermen to fish within their territory, locating landing sites and boat mooring as well as settling and resolving disputes and conflicts arising from fishing and sharing of the catch. Lately, upon creation of government fisheries offices in district level, Panglima Laôt became merely ‘customary police’. He was only responsible in resolving conflicts among fishermen; however, the custom occupied wide aspects of conflicts, varied from catch sharing to fishnet thievery. He is not authorised to officially make a verdict, although he can practically impose penalty, confiscate fish catch, pass the compensation and prohibit the fishing activity. It makes custom enforcement weak by the law. Consequently, he needs to coordinate with the Geuchik (village head) and Imum Mukim (sub district head) in resolving disputes and conflicts since his authority may superimpose the authority of gampong (village) or mukim (sub district).

The custom is neither in writing nor well-documented and applied exclusively in marine capture fisheries. Territorial boundaries between two or more lhôks are vague and can be expanded borderless toward horizons. While conflict occurred in offshore fishing area, it was not easy to settle the case because it is beyond its territory. Panglima Laôt only authorises fishing right, not license, within the lhôk after discussion with Geuchik or Imum Mukim to prevent conflicts. Fishing rights given to certain groups were not automatically designated to certain fishing plots. It would only be used as a recommendation for applying boat license to Syahbandar (harbourmaster) and fishing license to local fisheries office. Other features in the fisheries industry in Aceh, aquaculture and processing, do not institutionally include the custom. However, these elements generate bigger earnings to regional income revenue and potentially drive toward overexploitation and promote conflicts in resource uses.

== Socio-politics ==
Previously a hereditary position, it is open to any eligible members as constituted in the latest 2000 Panglima Laôt convention. National political changes that gave wider local autonomy in Aceh provided opportunity to the Acehnese to apply local culture and, thus, recognise this customary system. Its role and position shifted from only Sultan’s bureaucrats to more independent civil representation. Internally, Panglima Laôt established local operational rules that should be complied with by the fisherman within his lhôk authority. Externally, Panglima Laôt represents their fishermen in resolving conflicts to fishermen from outside his lhôk territory, including conflict with foreign fisherman such as Thailand, India and Myanmar. The situation is beneficial to the application of such customary regime since the fishermen feel secure in doing their fishing activities. The government will also benefit from the system since the strong compliance will reduce their intervention in monitoring overexploitation of local marine resources. In addition, its power shifts following political changes and technology improvement. Previously represented Sultan’s power over maritime space, it becomes more independent in representing civil society. Its territory is also improving, from subsistent level to wider waters following the expansion of motorised fishing technology [8].

== Impacts of the 2004 Tsunami ==
Traditionally, Panglima Laôt usually belonged to pivotal figures in local fishing community who has advanced knowledge and experience in maritime aspect and long experience as pawang (boat captain), as well as understanding all aspects of the custom. Regrettably, the recent tsunami killed 13 to 14 thousands fishermen; many of them are the Panglima Laôt . Since Panglima Laôt was solely one person who was responsible for the job, surviving members of lhôk community have found it is difficult to establish a new person with the same skills and capability as his predecessor. In addition, the loss also risks bringing such unwritten and undocumented custom to extinction.

It is estimated the catastrophe decreased fisheries outputs in Aceh to 60% as well as damaged 65% of infrastructures and 55% of equipment. The situation potentially encourages the industry to extend fishing efforts to accelerate their recovery. Finally, incoming tsunami relief aid initiatives from third parties potentially promote potential conflicts, such as delivery of incompatible gears (canoes/boats, nets), incomplete consultation process on how the aid will be delivered, overlapping initiatives in certain sites, unclear delivery schedule, etc.
