= Wild fisheries =

Area containing fish that are harvested commercially

Global harvest of wild captured aquatic organisms in million tonnes (1950–2010)

Wild fisheries are natural bodies of water with a sizeable free-ranging fish or other aquatic animal (crustaceans and molluscs) population that can be harvested for commercial value. Wild fisheries can be marine (saltwater) or lacustrine/riverine (freshwater), and rely heavily on the carrying capacity of the local aquatic ecosystem.

Wild fisheries are sometimes called capture fisheries. The aquatic life they support is not artificially controlled in any meaningful way and needs to be "captured" or fished. Wild fisheries exist primarily in the oceans, and particularly around coasts and continental shelves, but also exist in lakes and rivers. Significant wild fisheries have collapsed or are in danger of collapsing, due to the issues of overfishing and pollution.

== Overview ==
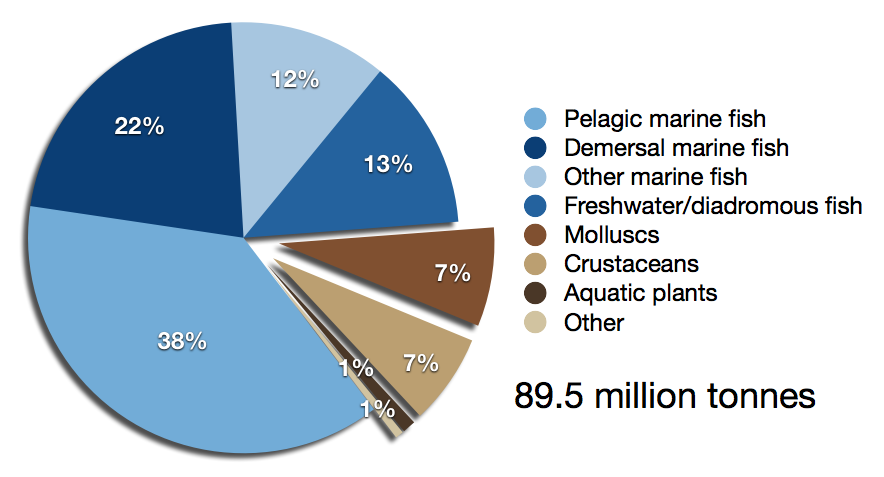
Global wild fish capture in million tonnes (2010)

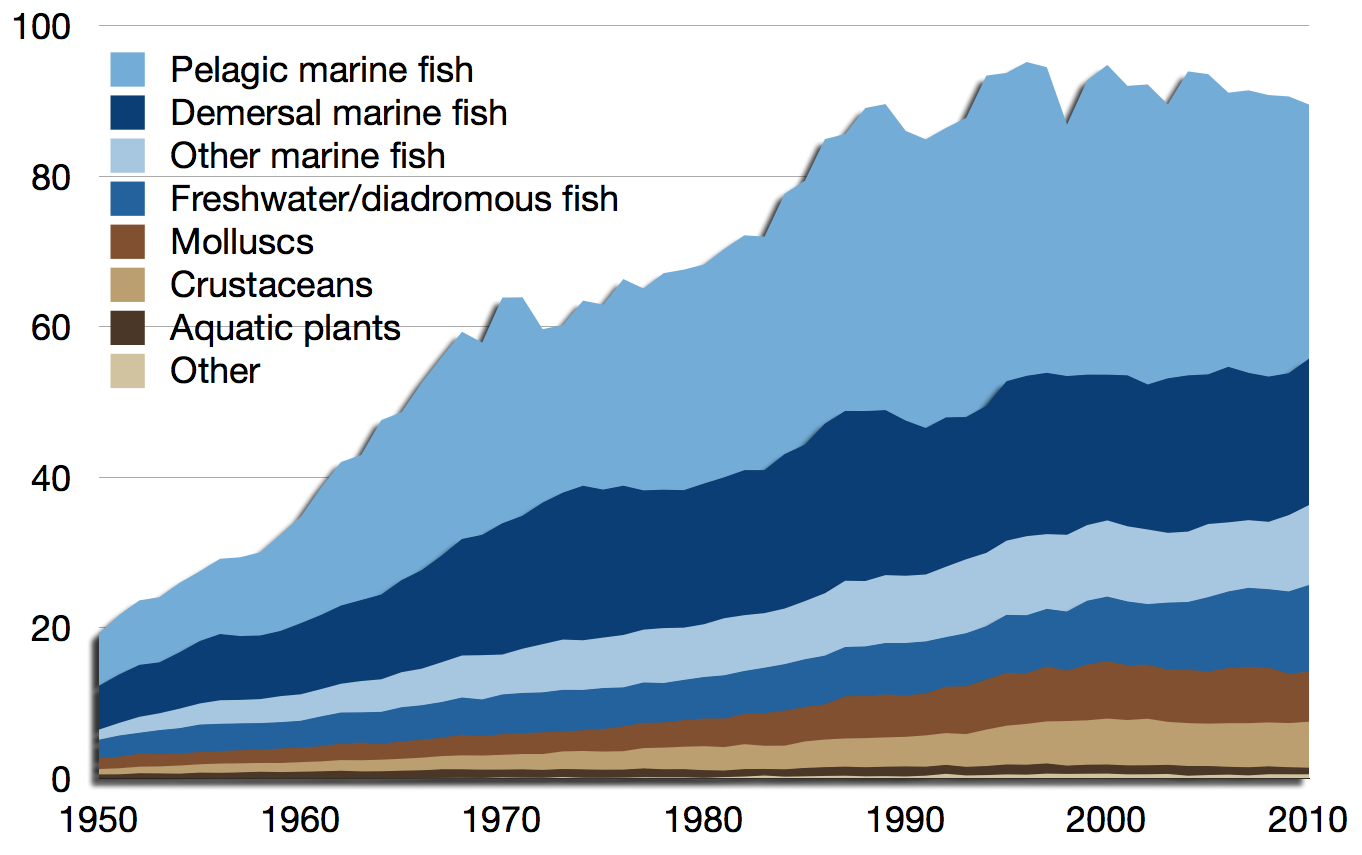
Global wild fish capture in million tonnes (1950–2010)

The global commercial production for human use of fish and other aquatic organisms occurs in two ways: they are either captured wild by commercial fishing or they are farmed using aquaculture and other fish farming techniques. As a contrast to wild fisheries, farmed fisheries can operate in sheltered coastal waters, rivers, lakes and ponds, or in enclosed bodies of water such as pools or fish tanks. Farmed fisheries are technological in nature, and revolve around developments in aquaculture. While farmed fisheries are expanding, the majority of fish consumed by humans continues to be sourced from wild fisheries. As of the early 21st century, fish is humanity's only significant wild food source.

According to the Food and Agriculture Organization (FAO), the world harvest by commercial fishing in 2010 consisted of 88.6 million tonnes of aquatic animals captured in wild fisheries, plus another 0.9 million tonnes of aquatic plants (such as seaweed). This can be contrasted with 59.9 million tonnes produced in fish farms, plus another 19.0 million tonnes of aquatic plants harvested in aquaculture.

In 2024, FAO found that China accounted for 14% of global capture production, and was followed by Indonesia (8%), India (7%), Peru (6%) and the Russia (5%). These five countries accounted for 41% of the total. Marine capture fisheries accounted for 87% and inland fisheries for 13% of global capture fisheries production of aquatic animals. World marine fisheries landed about 80 million tonnes of aquatic animals, an increase of 0.7% compared to the average of the previous three years, but below the peak of 84 million tonnes recorded in 2018. Finfish accounted for about 85% of total marine capture production of aquatic animals, led by anchovy, followed by alaska pollock and skipjack tuna.

== Marine fisheries ==
The productivity of marine fisheries is largely determined by marine topography, including its interaction with ocean currents and the diminishment of sunlight with depth.

Oceanic gyres are large-scale ocean currents caused by the Coriolis effect. Wind-driven surface currents interact with these gyres and the underwater topography, such as seamounts and the edge of continental shelves, to produce downwellings and upwellings. These can transport nutrients and provide feeding grounds for plankton eating forage fish. This in turn draws larger fish that prey on the forage fish, and can result in productive fishing grounds. Most upwellings are coastal, and many of them support some of the most productive fisheries in the world, such as small pelagics (sardines, anchovies, etc.). Regions of upwelling include coastal Peru, Chile, Arabian Sea, western South Africa, eastern New Zealand and the California coast.

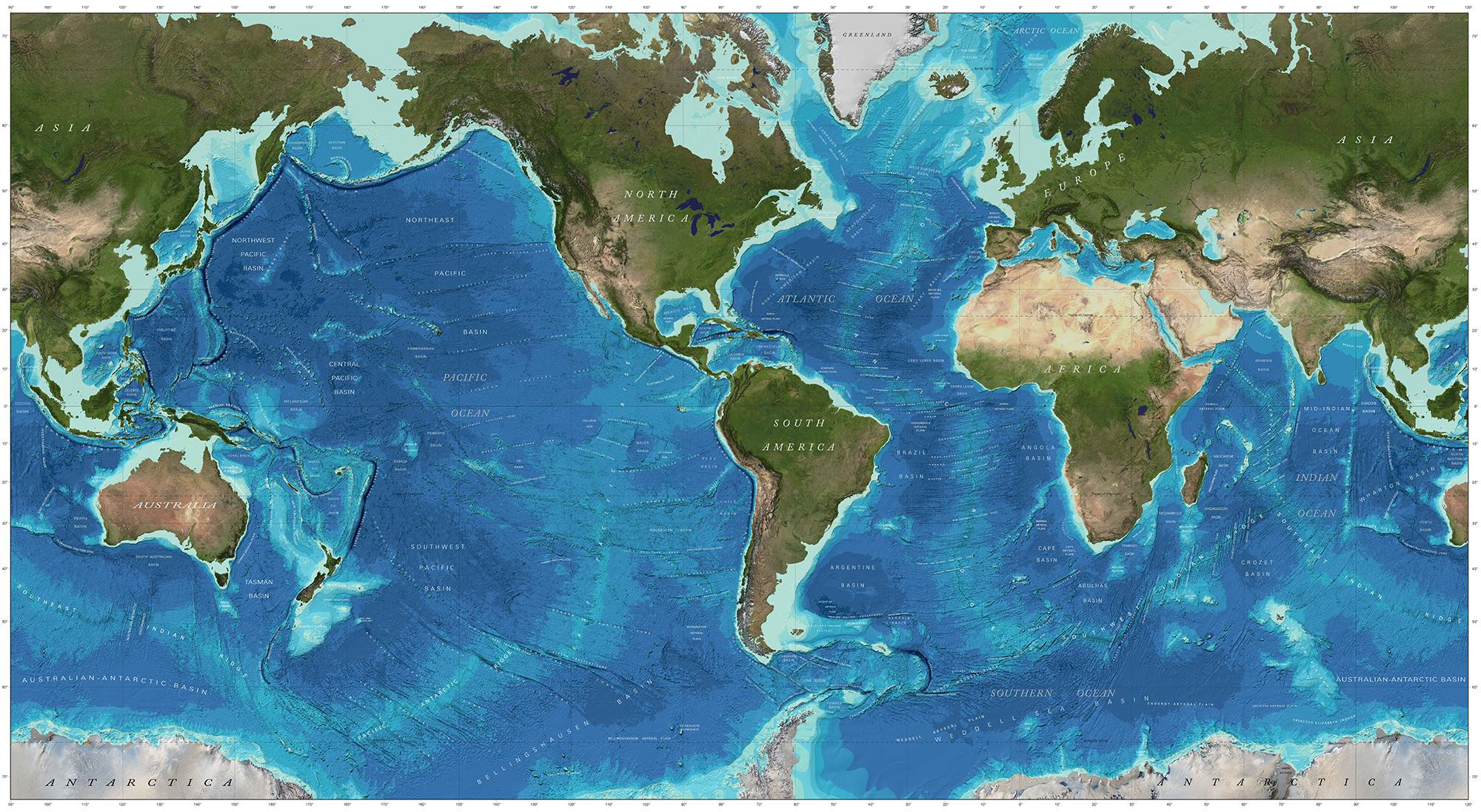
Global continental shelf, highlighted in light green

Continental shelves are the extended perimeters of each continent and associated coastal plain, and are important fishing areas. The shallowest parts of the continental shelf are called fishing banks. These waters are rich in fish resources due to the high number of plankton, on which most fish feed. Combined with the sunlight available in shallow waters, the continental shelves teem with life compared to the biotic desert of the oceans' abyssal plain. Many pelagic fish migrate across these plains in search of spawning or different feeding grounds. Smaller migratory fish are followed by larger predator fish and can provide rich, if temporary, fishing grounds.

=== Ocean currents ===
The Humboldt Current (Peru Current) produces a cold, low-salinity ocean current that flows north-westward along the west coast of South America from the southern tip of Chile to northern Peru. This results in the most prominent upwelling system in the world, supporting an extraordinary abundance of marine life. Upwelling occurs off Peru year-round and off Chile during the spring and summer. A significant amount of the world's fish catch comes from the Humboldt Current, which includes sardines, anchovies and jack mackerel among others.

The California Current is a Pacific Ocean current that moves south along the western coast of North America, beginning off southern British Columbia, and ending off southern Baja California. The cold water of this current is highly productive due to the upwelling, which brings to the surface nutrient-rich sediments, supporting large populations of whales, seabirds and important fisheries. During El Niño events, the California Current is disrupted, leading to declines in phytoplankton, resulting in cascading effects up the food chain, such as declines in fisheries, seabird breeding failures and marine mammal mortality. In 2005, a failure in the otherwise predictable upwelling events, unassociated with El Niño, caused a collapse in krill in the current, leading to similar effects.

=== Coral reefs ===
Coral reefs are valuable fishing areas as they are home to a variety of tropical or reef fish, such as parrotfish, angelfish, damselfish, and butterflyfish. Other fish groups found on coral reefs include groupers, snappers, grunts and wrasses. Over 4,000 species of fish inhabit coral reefs.

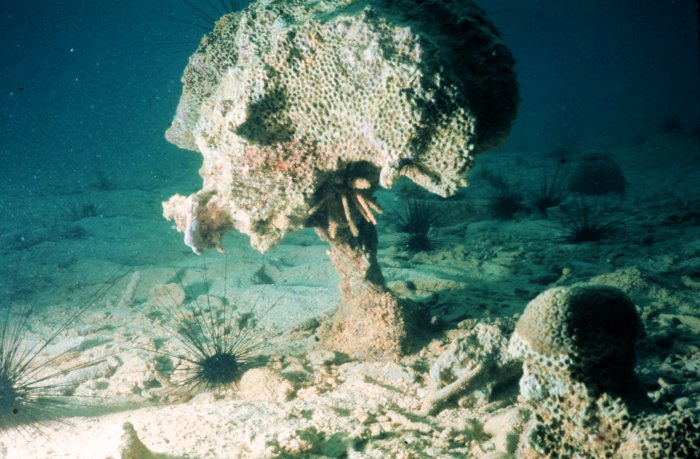
Bioerosion such as this may be caused by coral bleaching

Human activity represents the greatest threat to coral reefs around the world. In particular, marine pollution and overfishing are the most serious threats to these ecosystems. Physical destruction of reefs due to boat and shipping traffic is a major concern. The live fish trade has been implicated as a major driver of decline of coral reefs. Hughes, et al., (2003), writes that "with increased human population and improved storage and transport systems, the scale of human impacts on reefs has grown exponentially. For example, markets for fishes and other natural resources have become global, supplying demand for reef resources far removed from their tropical sources."

Southeast Asian coral reefs are at risk from damaging fishing practices (such as cyanide fishing and blast fishing), overfishing, and pollution. A variety of activities, including education, regulation, and the establishment of marine protected areas are under way to protect these reefs. Indonesia, for example, has nearly 33,000 square miles (85,000 km^{2}) of coral reefs. Its waters are home to a third of the world's total corals and a quarter of its fish species. These coral reefs are located in the heart of the Coral Triangle and have been victim to destructive fishing, unregulated tourism, and coral bleaching due to climate change. Coral bleaching in turn leads to bioerosion which threatens marine life on a significant scale.

- - - - pelagic
        - predator
          - tuna
          - billfish
          - shark
        - forage
          - herring
          - sardine
          - anchovy
          - menhaden
      - demersal
        - benthopelagic
          cod
        - benthic
          flatfish

Major marine wild fisheries

General estimates showed that approximately 10% of the coral reefs around the world were already dead by the early 2000s. Over 40% of coral species face extinction globally. It is estimated that by 2050 up to 90% of world's coral reefs could be dead due to ocean heat waves. The threat to the health of reefs is particularly strong in Southeast Asia, where an enormous 80% of reefs are considered endangered. Problems range from environmental impact of fishing techniques to ocean acidification.

Inhabitants of Ahus Island, Papua New Guinea, have followed a generations-old practice of restricting fishing in six areas of their reef lagoon. While line fishing is permitted, net and spearfishing are restricted based on cultural traditions. The result is that both the biomass and individual fish sizes are significantly larger in these areas than in places where fishing is completely unrestricted.

=== Seamounts ===
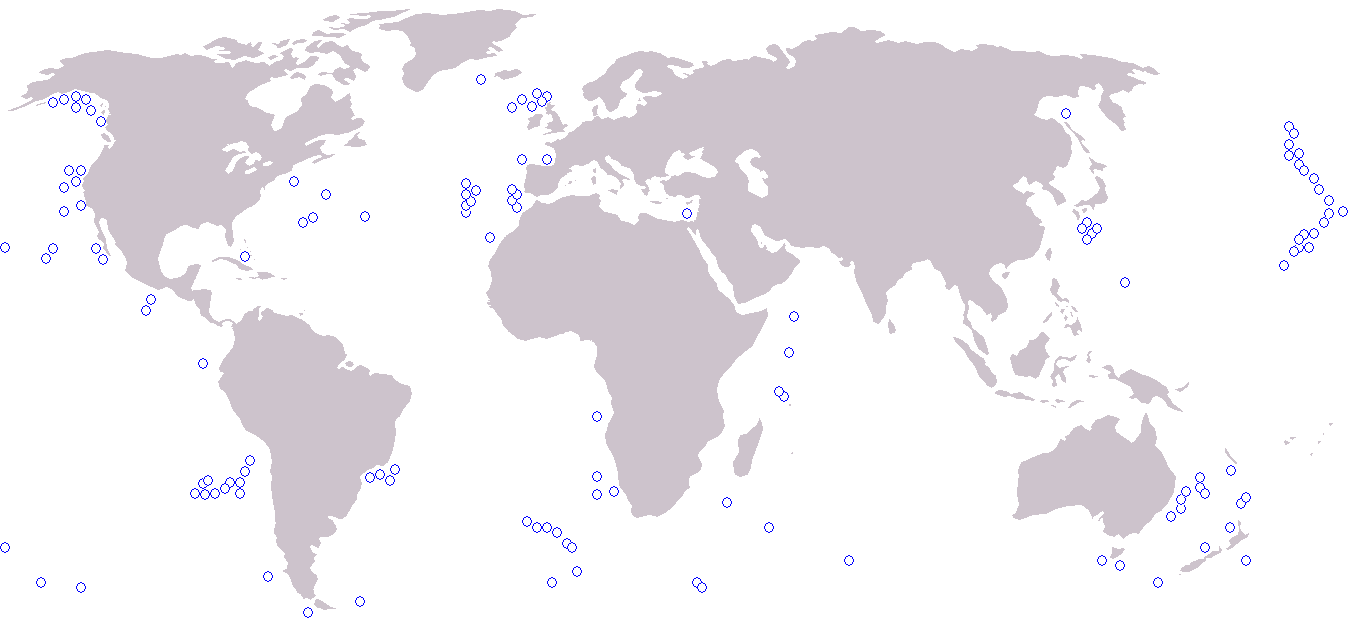
Map of major seamounts around the world

A seamount is an underwater mountain, rising from the seafloor that does not reach to the water's surface (sea level). Seamounts are hotspots of marine life.

Seamounts often project upwards into shallower zones more hospitable to marine life, providing habitats for marine species that are not found on or around the surrounding deeper ocean bottom. In addition to simply providing physical presence in this zone, the seamount itself may deflect deep currents and create upwelling. This process can bring nutrients into the photosynthetic zone, producing an area of activity in an otherwise desert-like open ocean. Seamounts may thus be vital stopping points for some migratory marine animals such as whales. Due to the larger populations of fish in these areas overexpoitation by the fishing industry has caused some seamount fauna populations to decrease considerably.

The primary productivity of the epipelagic waters above the submerged peak can often be enhanced by the hydrographic conditions of the seamount. This increases the densities of the zooplankton and leads to the high concentrations of fish in these areas. Another theory for this is that the fish are sustained on the diurnal migration of zooplankton being interrupted by the presence of the seamount, and causing the zooplankton to stay in the area. It is also possible that the high densities of fishes has more to do with the fish life histories and interaction with the benthic fauna of the seamount.

During the 1960s, Russia, Australia and New Zealand started to look for new stocks of fish and began to trawl their neighboring seamounts. The majority of the invertebrates brought up are corals, and are mainly used for the jewelry trade. The two major fish species were the orange roughy (Hoplostethus atlanticus) and pelagic armourhead (Pseudopentaceros wheeleri), which were quickly overexploited due to lack of knowledge of the longevity of the fish, late maturity, low fecundity, small geographic range and recruitment to the fishery. As well as the fishes being overexploited, the benthic communities were destroyed by the trawling gear.

== Freshwater fisheries ==
Freshwater fisheries (lakes and rivers) are also significant producers of fish for human use. Worldwide, freshwater lakes have an area of 1.5 million square kilometres. Saline inland seas add another 1.0 million square kilometres. There are 28 freshwater lakes with an area greater than 5,000 square kilometres, totalling 1.18 million square kilometres or 79% of the total.

Freshwater fisheries have a disproportionately high diversity of species compared to other ecosystems. Although freshwater habitats cover less than 1% of the world's surface, they provide a home for over 25% of known vertebrates, more than 126,000 known animal species, about 24,800 species of freshwater fish, molluscs, crabs and dragonflies, and about 2,600 macrophytes. Continuing industrial and agricultural developments place huge strain on these freshwater systems. Waters are polluted or extracted at high levels, wetlands are drained, rivers channelled, forests deforestated leading to sedimentation, invasive species are introduced, and over-harvesting occurs.

Freshwater fisheries are essential to supporting human life around the globe whether they are used for recreation or commercial use. Climate change presents several challenges in sustaining these fisheries as waters become warmer resulting in decreased dissolved oxygen. As the toxicity of pollutants has also been increasing, this leads to physiological changes in fishes and their habitat systems. Deoxygenation and eutrophication are two major effects that are detrimental to fish and ecosystem health and the problem becomes more prevalent as the size of the body of water decreases. Increased management and surveillance on freshwater fisheries is vital to the longevity, sustainability, and productivity of the fisheries and is also essential to maintaining food production from it.

== Practices ==
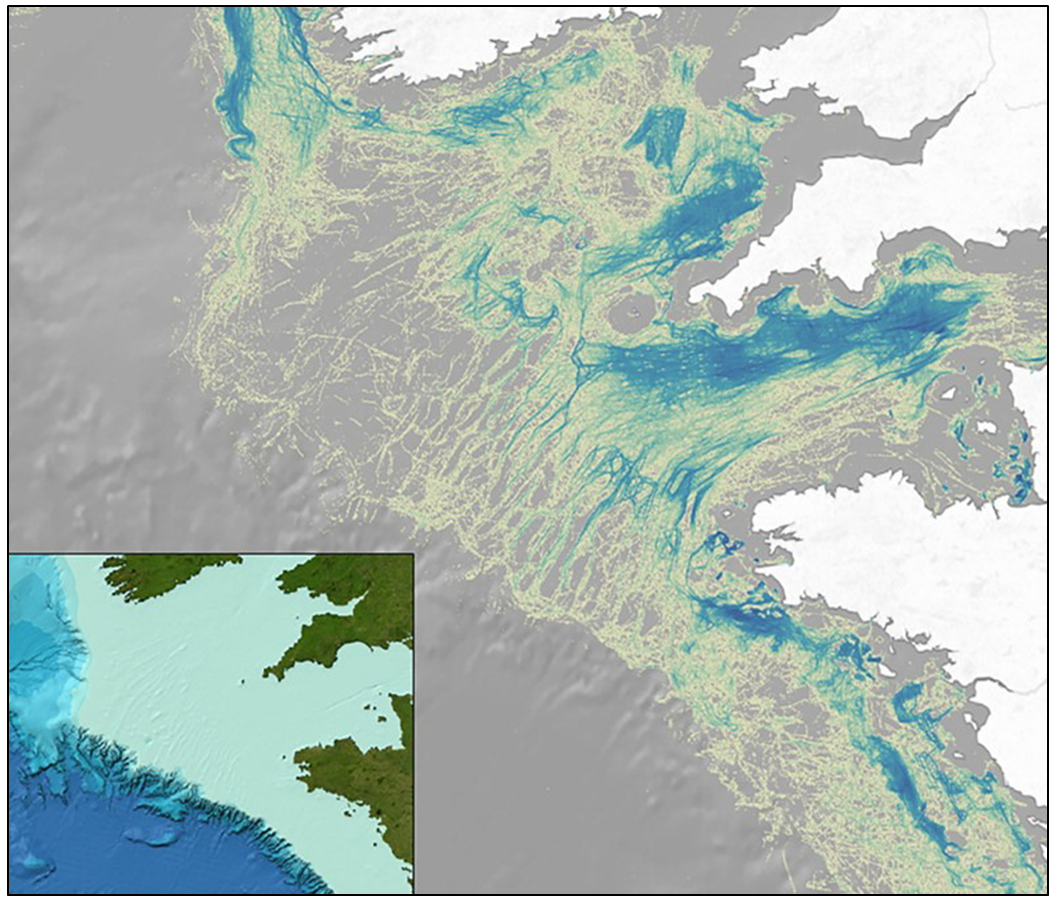
Fishing activities extracted from Automatic Identification Data of EU trawlers over the continental shelf, highlighting the correlation with the bathymetry over the area (bottom-left), from the GEBCO world map 2014)

Different practices are employed to harvest fish and other marine animals for commercial value, with chief among them being trawling. The damaging impact of trawling on marine environments, marine species and the ocean floor has become evident in recent years. Although trawling today is heavily regulated in some nations, it remains the target of many protests by environmentalists. Environmental concerns related to trawling refer to two areas: the lack of selectivity and the physical damage which the trawl does to the seabed.

=== Trawling ===
Wild fish catch from bottom trawling (1950–2018)

Trawling is an industrial method of fishing that involves pulling a fishing net through the water behind one or more boats. The net used for trawling is called a trawl. This principle requires netting bags which are towed through water to catch different species of fishes or sometimes targeted species. Trawls are often called towed gear or dragged gear.

The boats that are used for trawling are called trawlers or draggers. Trawlers vary in size from small open boats with as little as 30 hp (22 kW) engines to large factory trawlers with over 10,000 hp (7.5 MW). Trawling can be carried out by one trawler or by two trawlers fishing cooperatively (pair trawling).

Trawling can be divided into bottom trawling and midwater trawling, depending on how high the trawl net is in the water column.

Since the practice of trawling started (c. 14th century), there have been concerns over trawling's lack of selectivity. Trawls may be non-selective, sweeping both marketable and undesirable fish and fish of both legal and illegal size. Any part of the catch which cannot be used is considered by-catch, some of which is killed accidentally by the trawling process. By-catch commonly includes valued species such as dolphins, sea turtles, and sharks, and may also include sublegal or immature individuals of the targeted species.

Many studies have documented large volumes of by-catch that are discarded. For example, researchers conducting a three-year study in the Clarence River found that an estimated 177 tons of by-catch (including 77 different species) were discarded each year.

== Issues ==
=== Pollution ===
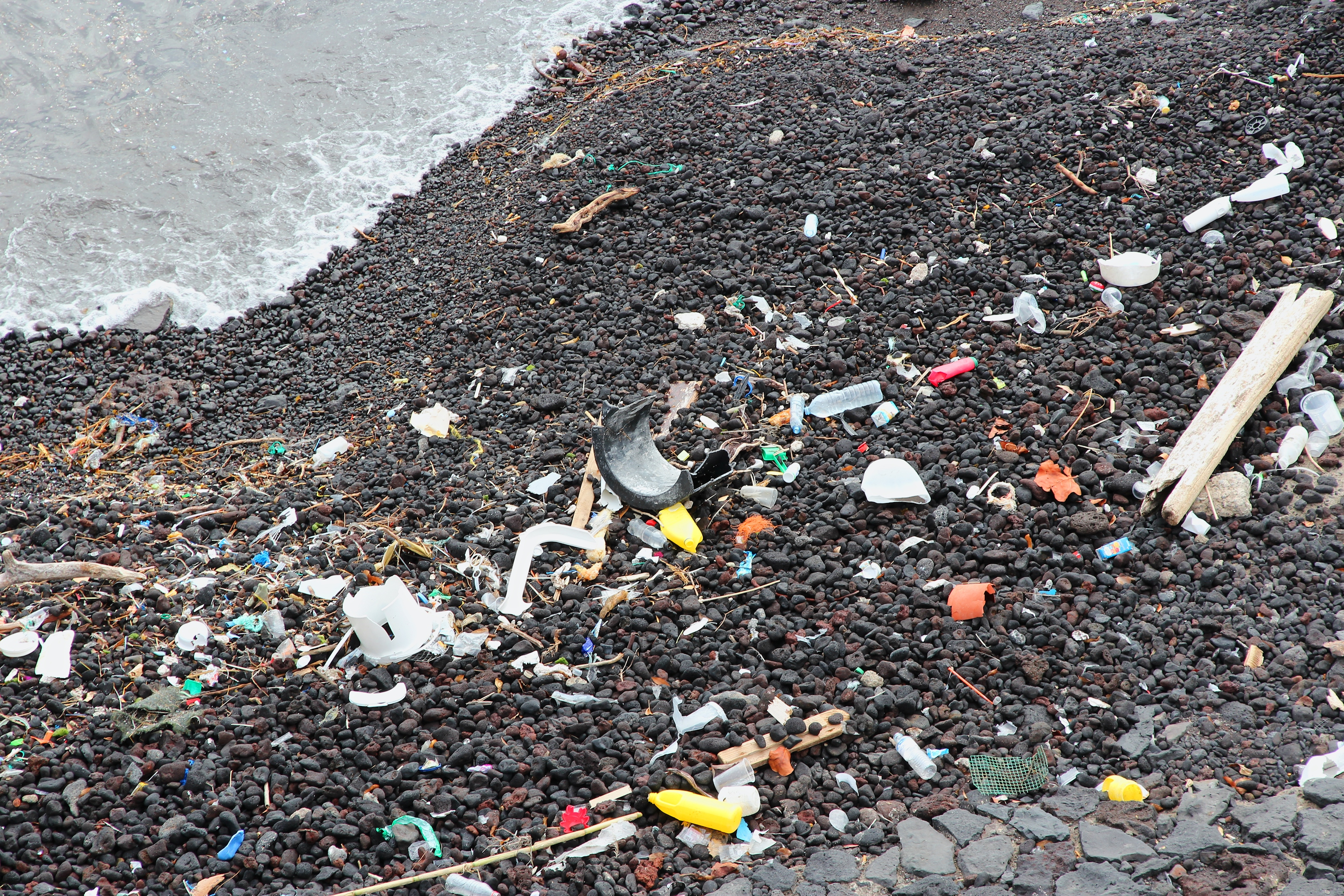
Atlantic Ocean marine plastic on a beach in Tenerife

Pollution is the introduction of contaminants into an environment. Wild fisheries flourish in oceans, lakes, and rivers, and the introduction of contaminants is an issue of concern, especially plastics, pesticides, heavy metals, and other industrial and agricultural pollutants which do not disintegrate rapidly in the environment. Land run-off and industrial, agricultural, and domestic waste enter rivers and are discharged into the sea. Ship pollution is also a problem. Pollution has had a significant impact on world's fisheries resources in terms of diminishing and unhealthy stocks. Marine debris is human-created waste that ends up floating in the sea. Oceanic debris tends to accumulate at the centre of gyres and coastlines, frequently washing aground where it is known as beach litter.

==== Plastic ====
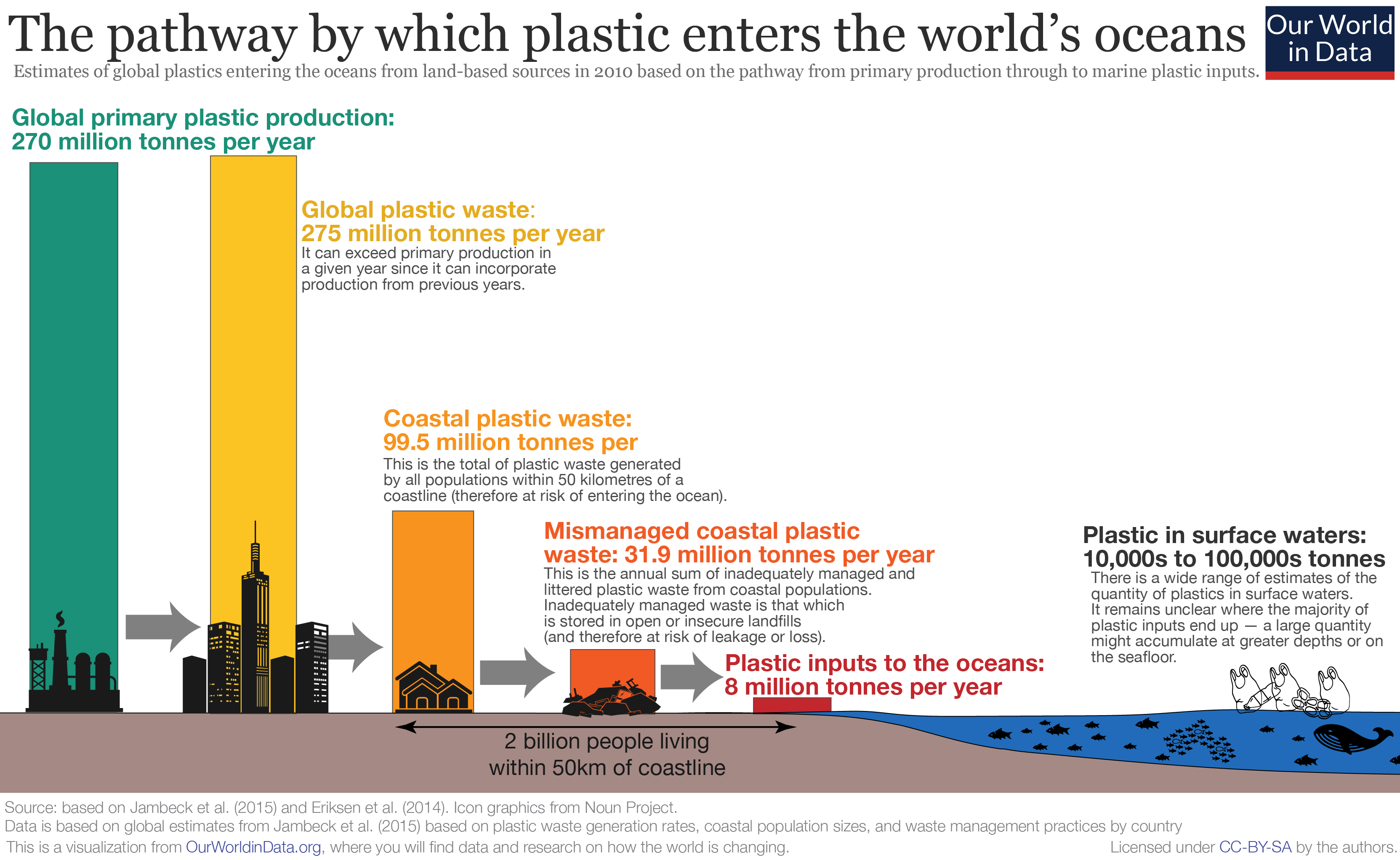
The pathway by which plastics enters the world's oceans

80% of all known marine debris is plastic - a component that has been rapidly accumulating since the end of World War II. Plastics accumulate because they don't biodegrade as many other substances do; while they will photodegrade on exposure to the sun, they do so only under dry conditions, as water inhibits this process. Discarded plastic bags, six-pack rings and other forms of plastic waste which finish up in the ocean present dangers to wildlife and fisheries. Aquatic life can be threatened through entanglement, suffocation, and ingestion.

Nurdles, also known as mermaids' tears, are plastic pellets typically under five millimetres in diameter, and are a major contributor to marine debris. They are used as a raw material in plastics manufacturing, and enter the natural environment after accidental spillages or through the physical weathering of larger plastic debris. As they strongly resemble fish eggs, marine wildlife often ingests them, leading to poisoning and death.

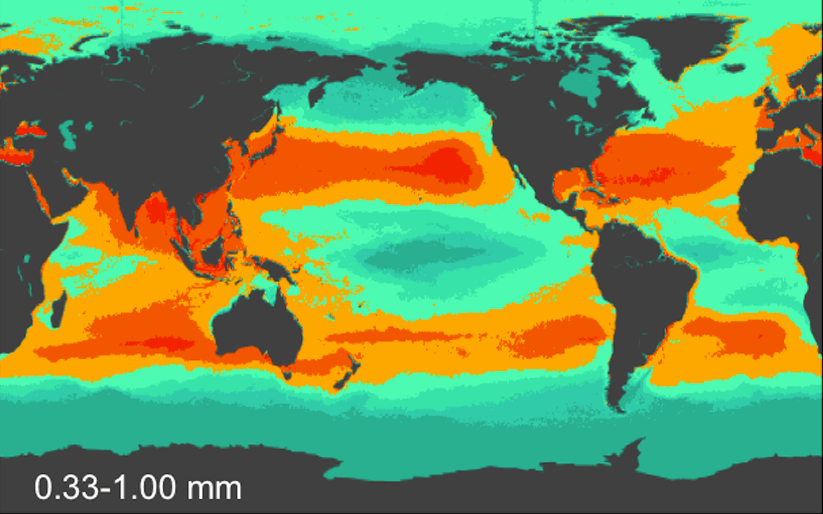
Model results for the count density of planktonic plastic particles (red is more dense, green is less dense)

Many animals that live on or in the sea consume flotsam by mistake, as it often looks similar to their natural prey. Plastic debris, when bulky or tangled, is difficult to pass, and may become permanently lodged in the digestive tracts of these animals, blocking the passage of food and causing death through starvation or infection. Tiny floating particles also resemble zooplankton, which can lead filter feeders to consume them and cause them to enter the ocean food chain. In samples taken from the North Pacific Gyre in 1999 by the Algalita Marine Research Foundation, the mass of plastic exceeded that of zooplankton by a factor of six. More recently, reports have surfaced that there may now be 30 times more plastic than plankton, the most abundant form of life in the ocean.

Toxic additives used in the manufacture of plastic materials can leach out into their surroundings when exposed to water. Waterborne hydrophobic pollutants collect and magnify on the surface of plastic debris, thus making plastic far more deadly in the ocean than it would be on land. Hydrophobic contaminants are also known to bioaccumulate in fatty tissues, biomagnifying up the food chain and putting great pressure on apex predators. Some plastic additives are known to disrupt the endocrine system when consumed, others can suppress the immune system or decrease reproductive rates.

The feeding habit of sea turtles influences their reaction to marine debris (video)

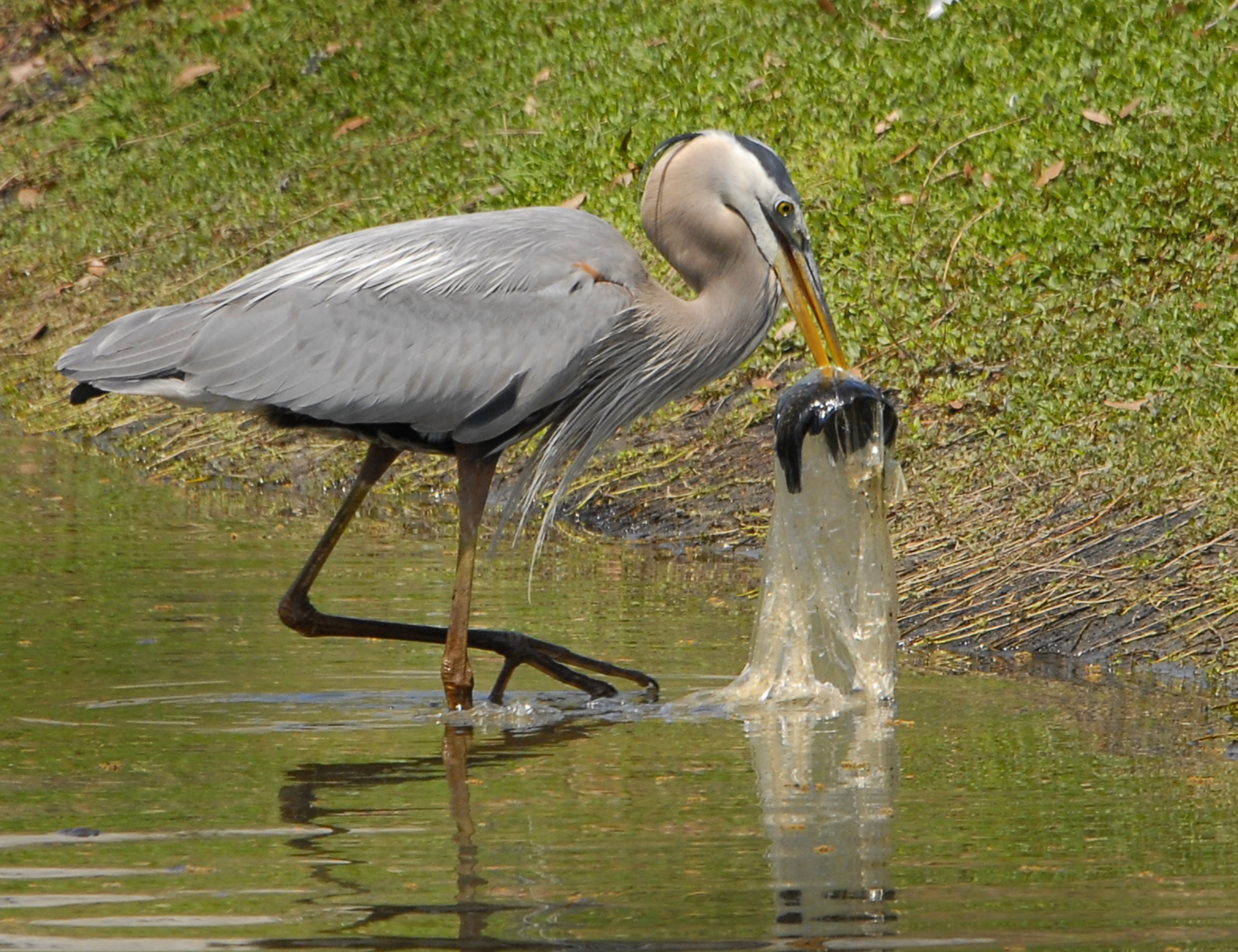
A great blue heron capturing a fish already caught in a plastic bag

==== Toxins ====
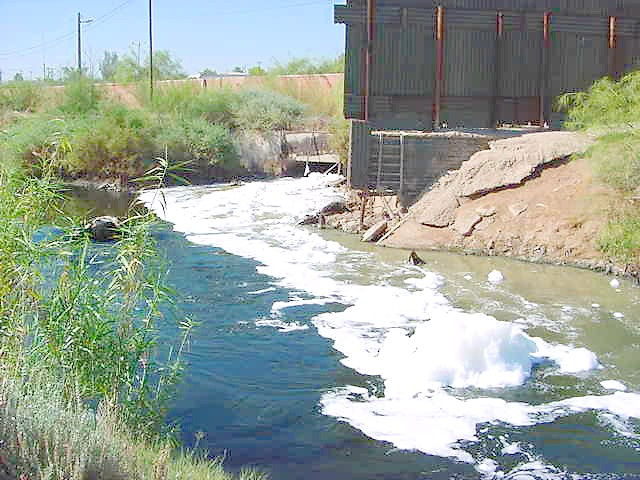
Septic river

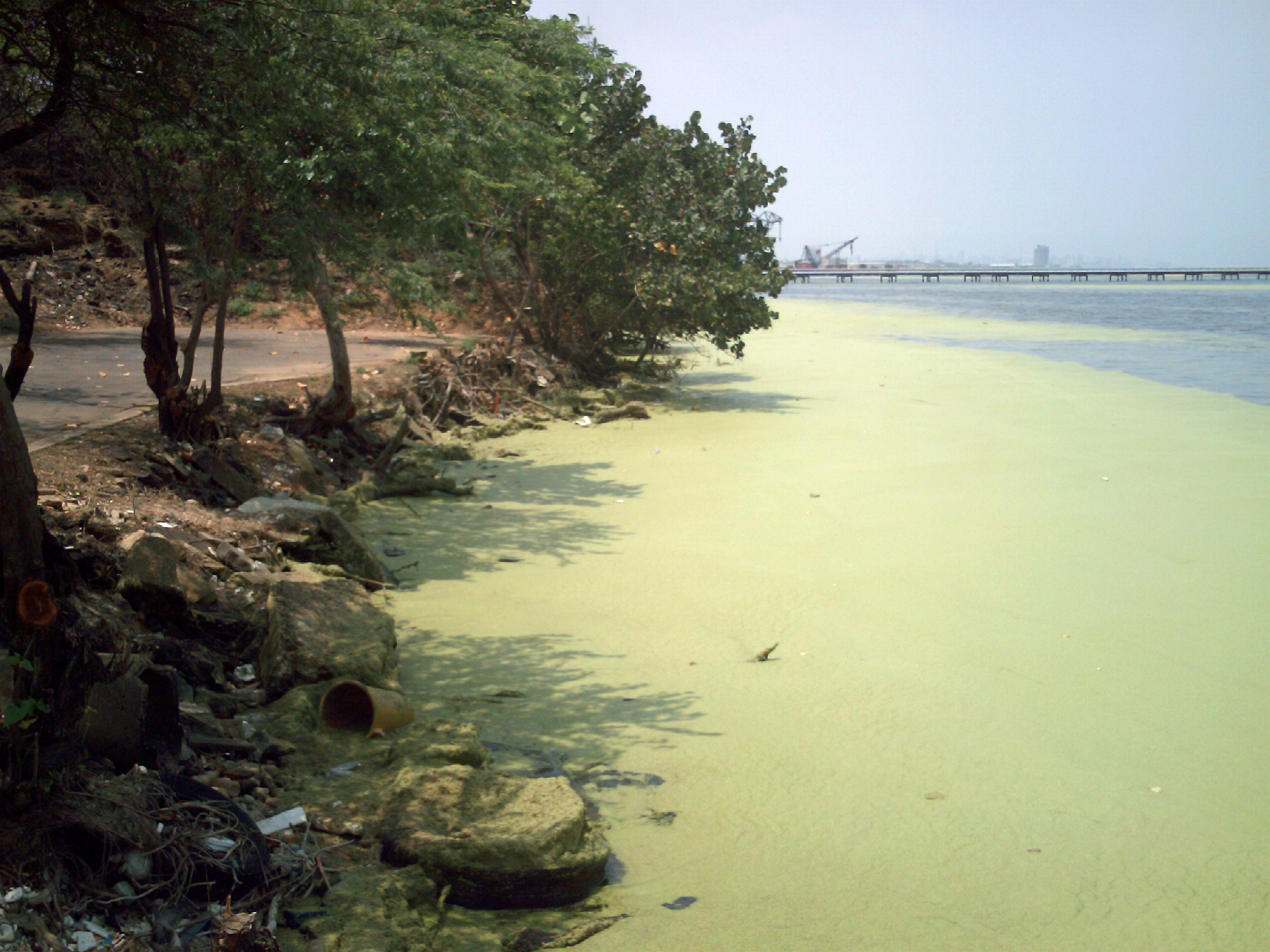
Polluted lagoon

Apart from plastics, there are particular problems with other toxins which do not disintegrate rapidly in the marine environment. Heavy metals are metallic chemical elements that have a relatively high density and are toxic or poisonous at low concentrations. Examples are mercury, lead, nickel, arsenic and cadmium. Other persistent toxins are PCBs, DDT, pesticides, furans, dioxins and phenols. Such toxins can accumulate in the tissues of many species of aquatic life under the a process of bioaccumulation. They are also known to accumulate in benthic environments, such as estuaries and bay muds: a geological record of human activities of the last century.

Some specific examples are:

- Chinese and Russian industrial pollution such as phenols and heavy metals in the Amur River have devastated fish stocks and damaged its estuary soil.
- Wabamun Lake in Alberta, Canada, once the best whitefish lake in the area, now has unacceptable levels of heavy metals in its sediment and fish.
- Acute and chronic pollution events have been shown to impact southern California kelp forests, though the intensity of the impact seems to depend on both the nature of the contaminants and duration of exposure.

Due to their high position in the food chain and the subsequent accumulation of heavy metals from their diet, mercury levels can be high in larger species such as bluefin tuna and albacore. As a result, in March 2004, the United States FDA issued guidelines recommending that pregnant women, nursing mothers and children limit their intake of tuna and other types of predatory fish. Some shellfish and crabs can survive polluted environments, accumulating heavy metals or toxins in their tissues. For example, mitten crabs have a remarkable ability to survive in highly modified aquatic habitats, including polluted waters. The farming and harvesting of such species requires careful management if they are to be used as a food source. According to the United States Environmental Protection Agency, mining has contaminated portions of the headwaters of over 40% of watersheds in the western continental US. Much of this pollution ends up in the sea. Oil spills are also a major contributor to marine pollution.

=== Eutrophication ===
Effect of eutrophication on marine benthic life

Eutrophication is an increase in chemical nutrients, typically compounds containing nitrogen or phosphorus, in an ecosystem. It can result in an increase in the ecosystem's primary productivity (excessive plant growth and decay), and further effects including lack of oxygen and severe reductions in water quality, fish, and other animal populations.

The biggest culprit are rivers that empty into the ocean, and with it the many chemicals used as fertilizers in agriculture as well as waste from livestock and humans. An excess of oxygen depleting chemicals in the water can lead to hypoxia and the creation of a dead zone.

Surveys have shown that 54% of lakes in Asia are eutrophic; in Europe, 53%; in North America, 48%; in South America, 41%; and in Africa, 28%. Estuaries also tend to be naturally eutrophic because land-derived nutrients are concentrated where run-off enters the marine environment in a confined channel. The World Resources Institute has identified 375 hypoxic coastal zones around the world, concentrated in coastal areas in Western Europe, the Eastern and Southern coasts of the US, and East Asia, particularly in Japan. In the ocean, there are frequent red tide algae blooms that kill fish and marine mammals and cause respiratory problems in humans and some domestic animals when the blooms reach close to shore.

In addition to land runoff, atmospheric anthropogenic fixed nitrogen can enter the open ocean. A study in 2008 found that this could account for around one third of the ocean's external (non-recycled) nitrogen supply and up to 3% of the annual new marine biological production. It has been suggested that accumulating reactive nitrogen in the environment may have consequences as serious as putting carbon dioxide in the atmosphere.

=== Acidification ===
The oceans are normally a natural carbon sink, absorbing carbon dioxide from the atmosphere. Because the levels of atmospheric carbon dioxide are increasing, the oceans are becoming more acidic. The potential consequences of ocean acidification are not fully understood, but there are concerns that structures made of calcium carbonate may become vulnerable to dissolution, affecting corals and the ability of shellfish to form shells.

A report from NOAA scientists published in the journal Science in May 2008 found that large amounts of relatively acidified water are upwelling to within four miles of the Pacific continental shelf area of North America. This area is a critical zone where most local marine life lives or is born. While the paper dealt only with areas from Vancouver to northern California, other continental shelf areas may be experiencing similar effects.

== Effects of fishing ==
=== Habitat destruction ===
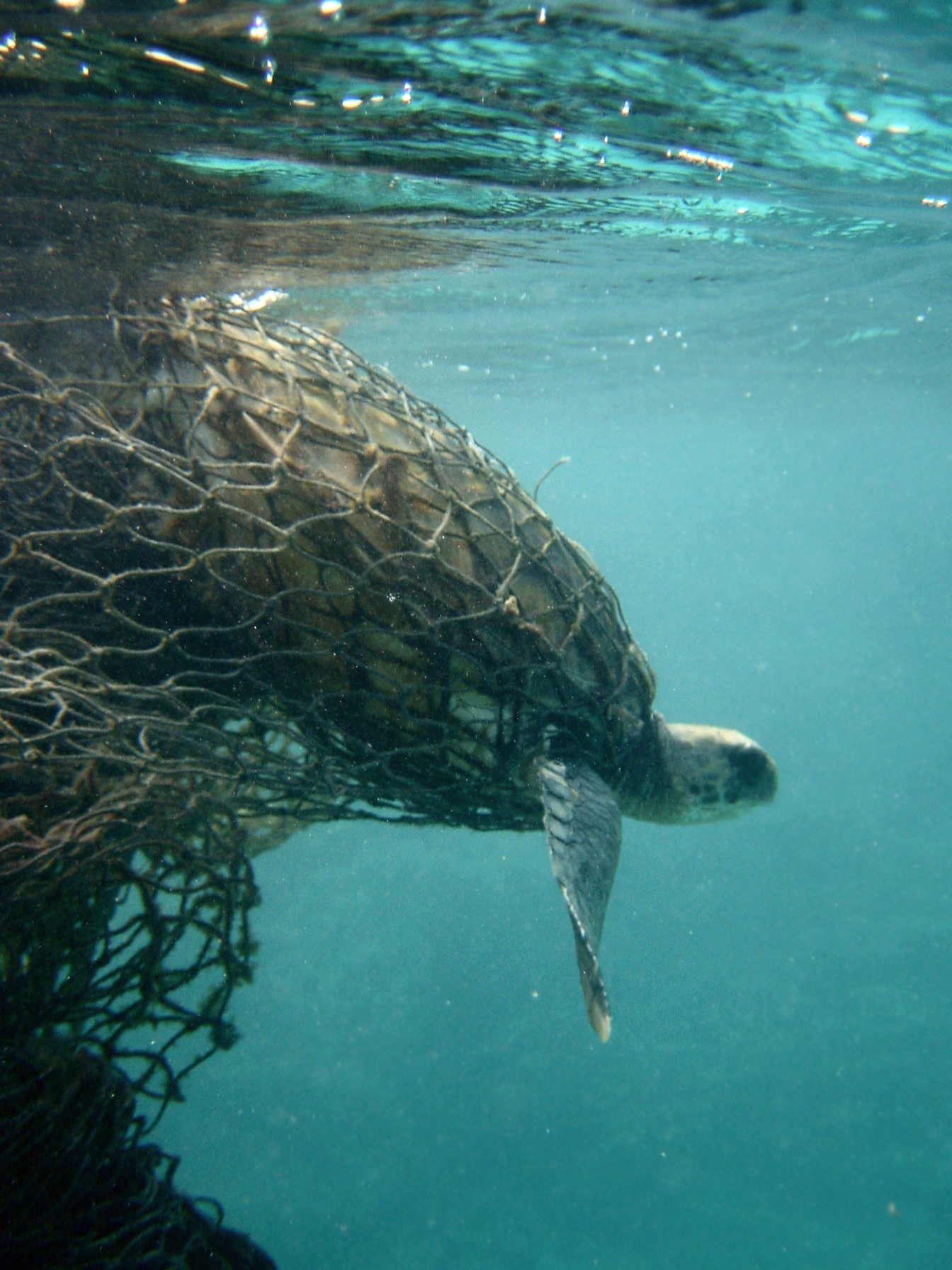
Sea turtle entangled in a ghost net

Fishing nets that have been left or lost in the ocean by fishermen are called ghost nets, and can entangle fish, dolphins, sea turtles, sharks, dugongs, crocodiles, seabirds, crabs, and other marine creatures. These nets restrict movement, causing starvation, laceration and infection, and suffocation.

Fishing operations often use bottom trawling, which is highly destructive to the ocean floor and marine environments. Numerous habitats and ecosystems are disturbed and destroyed by trawling including coral reefs, sediments, and grasses that provide feeding and breeding grounds for a plethora of marine organisms. Coastal habitats such as mangroves are often sites of aquaculture farming practices in which the mangroves are either destroyed for easier use of the land or experience harmful conditions due to the farm being abandoned once the area becomes too polluted with excess nutrients.

A paper published by the National Academy of Sciences of the US in 2008 warned that: "Synergistic effects of habitat destruction, overfishing, introduced species, warming, acidification, toxins, and massive runoff of nutrients are transforming once complex ecosystems like coral reefs and kelp forests into monotonous level bottoms, transforming clear and productive coastal seas into anoxic dead zones, and transforming complex food webs topped by big animals into simplified, microbially dominated ecosystems with boom and bust cycles of toxic dinoflagellate blooms, jellyfish, and disease".

=== Overfishing ===
Some specific examples of overfishing:

- On the east coast of the United States, the availability of bay scallops has been greatly diminished by the overfishing of sharks in the area. A variety of sharks have, until recently, fed on rays, which are a main predator of bay scallops. With the shark population reduced, in some places almost totally, the rays have been free to dine on scallops to the point of greatly decreasing their numbers.
- Chesapeake Bay's once-flourishing oyster populations historically filtered the estuary's entire water volume of excess nutrients every three or four days. Today that process takes almost a year, and sediment, nutrients, and algae can cause problems in local waters. Oysters filter these pollutants, and either eat them or shape them into small packets that are deposited on the bottom where they are harmless.
- The Australian government alleged in 2006 that Japan illegally overfished southern bluefin tuna by taking 12,000 to 20,000 tonnes per year instead of their agreed 6,000 tonnes; the value of such overfishing would be as much as US$2 billion. Such overfishing has resulted in severe damage to stocks. "Japan's huge appetite for tuna will take the most sought-after stocks to the brink of commercial extinction unless fisheries agree on more rigid quotas" stated the WWF. Japan disputes this figure, but acknowledges that some overfishing has occurred in the past.

Overfishing presents a major challenge to fish population densities, as the populations plummet below the maximum sustainable yield (MSY) value, it leads to the loss of biodiversity and possibility for extinction. The loss in diversity is especially concerning as less diversity decreases a population's ability to adapt and survive the alterations of the habitat due to environmental changes from climate change and human activities.

Overexploitation practices continue to increase among global fish stocks
(1974–2015)

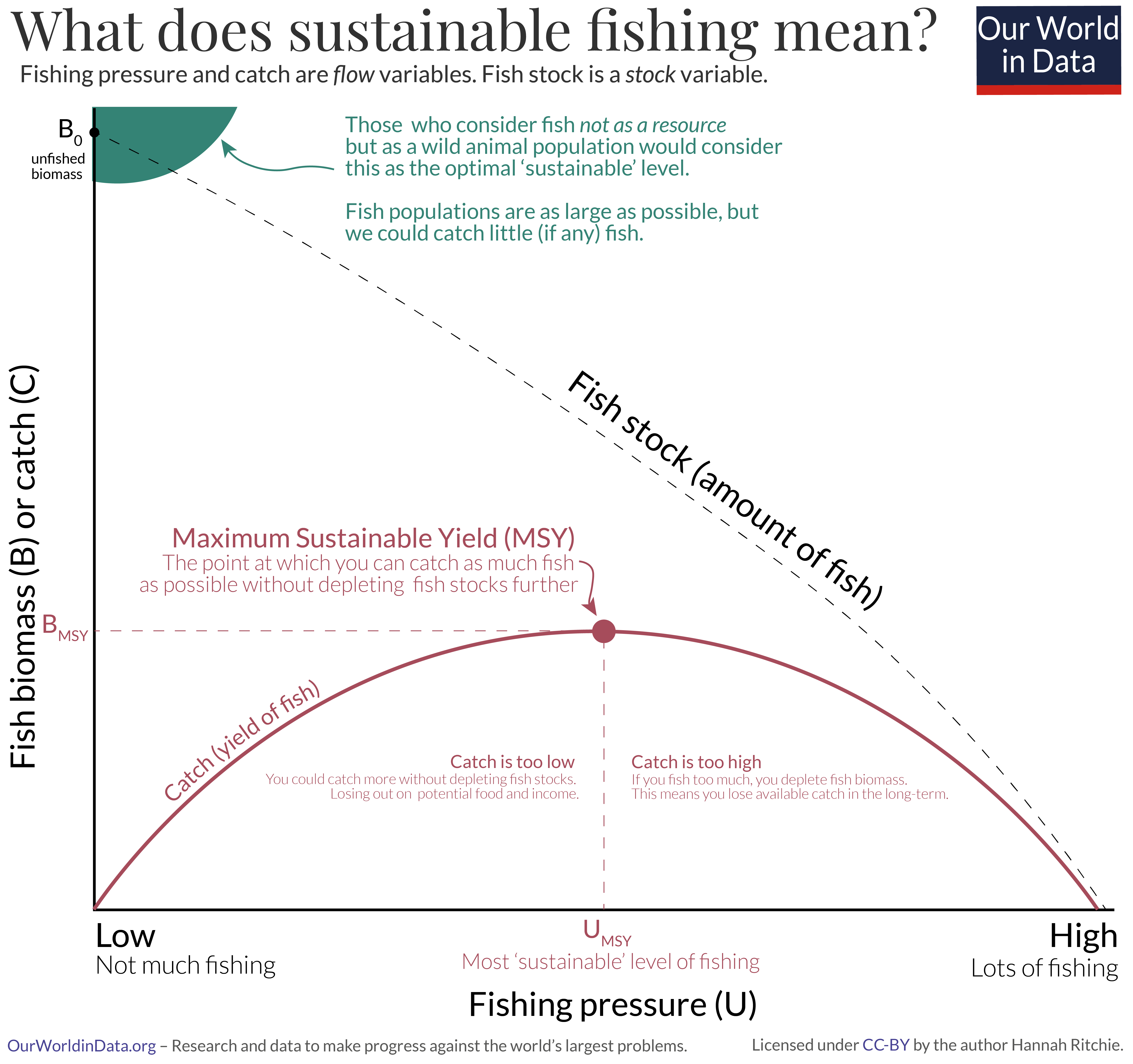
This graph demonstrates the importance of following a specific quota of exploitation to sustain a fish population

Global trends in the state of the world marine fishery stocks
(1974 - 2023)

=== Threatened species ===
The global standard for recording threatened marine species is the IUCN Red List of Threatened Species. This list is the foundation for marine conservation priorities worldwide. A species is listed in the threatened category if it is considered to be critically endangered, endangered, or vulnerable. Other categories are near threatened and data deficient.

Many marine species are under increasing risk of extinction and marine biodiversity is undergoing potentially irreversible loss due to threats such as overfishing, bycatch, climate change, invasive species and coastal development. In 2008, the IUCN assessed about 3,000 marine species. This includes assessments of known species of shark, ray, chimaera, reef-building coral, grouper, marine turtle, seabird, and marine mammal. Almost one-quarter (22%) of these groups have been listed as threatened.

Group	Species	Threatened	Near threatened	Data deficient	Notes
Sharks, rays, and chimaeras	—N/a	17%	13%	47%	These are deep water pelagic species, which makes them difficult to study in the wild. Much of what is currently known is from their capture in fishing nets from both targeted and accidental catch. Many of these slow growing species are not recovering from overfishing by shark fisheries around the world.
Groupers	—N/a	12%	14%	30%	Major threats are overfishing, particularly the uncontrolled fishing of small juveniles and spawning adults.
Reef-building corals	845	27%	20%	17%	The primary threats to corals are bleaching and disease which has been linked to an increase in sea temperatures. Other threats include coastal development, coral extraction, sedimentation and pollution. The loss of coral reef ecosystems has a devastating effects on many marine species, as well as on people that depend on reef resources for their livelihoods.
Marine mammals	—N/a	25%	—N/a	—N/a	Major threats include entanglement in ghost nets, targeted harvesting, noise pollution from military and seismic sonar, and boat strikes. Other threats are water pollution, habitat loss from coastal development, loss of food sources due to the collapse of fisheries, and climate change.
Seabirds	—N/a	27%	—N/a	—N/a	Major threats include longline fisheries and gillnets, oil spills, and predation by rodents and cats in their breeding grounds. Other threats are habitat loss and degradation from coastal development, logging and pollution.
Marine turtles	7	86%	—N/a	—N/a	Marine turtles lay their eggs on beaches, and are subject to threats such as coastal development, sand mining, and predators, including humans who collect their eggs for food in many parts of the world. At sea, marine turtles can be targeted by small scale subsistence fisheries, or become bycatch during longline and trawling activities, or become entangled in ghost nets or struck by boats.

An ambitious project, called the Global Marine Species Assessment, is under way to make IUCN Red List assessments for another 17,000 marine species by 2012. Groups targeted include the approximately 15,000 known marine fishes, and important habitat-forming primary producers such mangroves, seagrasses, certain seaweeds and the remaining corals; and important invertebrate groups including molluscs and echinoderms.

In the 2008 IUCN Red List, about 6,000 or 22% of the known freshwater species were assessed at a global scale, leaving about 21,000 species still to be assessed. However, a significant proportion of freshwater species were listed as data deficient.

== See also ==
- List of countries by seafood consumption
- List of harvested aquatic animals by weight
- Population dynamics of fisheries
- Fisheries science
- Fisheries management
- Sustainable fishing

== Sources ==
This article incorporates text from a free content work. Licensed under CC BY 4.0 (license statement/permission). Text taken from The State of World Fisheries and Aquaculture 2026, Food and Agriculture Organization of the United Nations.
