= Destructive fishing practices =

Destructive aquatic practice

Destructive fishing practices (DFPs), also called destructive fishing, are fishing methods, or uses of fishing gear, that cause irreversible damage to habitats, unsafe declines in species populations, or harm to the livelihoods of the people who depend on them. The practices most often described as destructive include bottom trawling over vulnerable habitats, blast fishing, cyanide fishing, shark finning, push netting, and ghost fishing by abandoned, lost of discarded gear. Their effects range from the conversion of coral reefs to rubble fields to the removal of tens of millions of sharks from the ocean each year.

The term appears in a number of international policy instruments but no single definition has been universally adopted. Many destructive practices are prohibited in national waters, yet enforcement is often weak, and international commitments, such as the Code of Conduct for Responsible Fisheries (1995) and United Nations General Assembly Resolution 61/105 (2006), are largely voluntary or call on states to act.

== Overview ==
The narrowest definition of destructive fishing practices refers principally to bottom trawling over vulnerable habitats (shallow corals, deep sea corals, or seagrass, for example), as well as practices such as shark finning, blast fishing, poison fishing, muro-ami, and push netting. These latter practices are not significant within the fishing zones of most developed nations, being generally outlawed.

A wider and more useful definition would include:

- overfishing beyond reasonable recovery limits, including serial overfishing;
- excessive or damaging levels of bycatch;
- the fishing of spawning aggregations without precautionary justification;
- intensive fishing over vulnerable habitats, including for example spawning and nursery areas; and
- high grading–the practice of discarding the lower-quality portion of the target catch.

Broader usages extend the term to overfishing beyond the point of recovery, damaging levels of bycatch, fishing on spawning aggregations, and ghost fishing by discarded gear, in addition to bottom trawling over vulnerable habitat.

The term “destructive fishing practices” has no single, agreed meaning. A systematic review of academic, media, and policy records from 1976 to 2020 found that the use of the term, relative to the generic term "fisheries", had increased since the 1990s, but that only about 15% of records described it in detail. The review found that records focused mainly on fishing in South-eastern Asia, followed by Southern Asia and Europe, that habitat damage and blast and poison fishing were the impact most often associated with the term, and that bottom trawling and unspecified net fishing were also regularly linker to it. Academic literature tended to describe the negative impacts of destructive fishing, while media articles focused on the gears and practices involved.

Some definitions treat destructiveness as a matter of context rather than of gear type. Virtually all fishing gear has some environmental impact, and that impact depends on how, where and how often the gear is used. Terminology attributed to the Food and Agriculture Organization (FAO) describes a destructive fishing practice as the use of a gear in the wrong habitat, for example bottom trawls over seagrass, macroalgae or coral beds, where the gear should be prohibited or used only at a rate that affects a relatively small part of the habitat.

In 2024 a group of researchers published an expert-driven study that descried destructive fishing as a "quasi-concept" and proposed a consensus definition covering practices that cause irreversible habitat damage, unsafe declines in species, and harm to livelihoods.

== History ==
The term "destructive fishing practices" (or DFPs) has been featured in international fisheries literature since about the 1990s. No widely accepted definition of the phrase exists, and this will almost certainly remain the situation, given very different national and industry perspectives.

The Outcomes and Implementation Statements of the World Summit on Sustainable Development, held in Johannesburg in 2002, contain a commitment to phasing out destructive fishing practices in the marine environment by the year 2012. All nations attending the summit supported this statement.

Many nations had made commitments to end destructive fishing practices much earlier. In 1999, 124 nations explicitly gave their support to the FAO Code of Conduct for Responsible Fisheries 1995 through the Rome Declaration on Responsible Fisheries. The list of these nations includes most of the major fishing nations of the world. However, while the Code of Conduct contains a commitment to end destructive fishing practices, the Code contains no timelines.

== Methods ==
=== Blast fishing ===
Blast fishing, also called dynamite or bomb fishing, involves detonating explosives over reefs to obtain fish for sale and consumption. A 2021 review of 212 papers found that the practice is widespread, misreported and ongoing, and has caused large-scale damage to coral reefs in Southeast Asia, Tanzania, the Red Sea and other parts of Asia, Africa, Europe and South America. The authors concluded that weak enforcement and governance are the main drivers, with socioeconomic factors contributing but not dominant. Blasting shatters living coral and leaves persistent rubble fields with low coral cover and fish communities of reduced diversity. In a study in the Philippines, a 20-year-old rubble field in a marine protected area was stabilized with plastic mesh and rock piles, after which the fishing community shifted within three years to one similar to the adjacent healthy reef.

=== Bottom trawling ===
Bottom trawling is trawling (towing a trawl, which is a fishing net) along the sea floor. It is also referred to as "dragging". The scientific community divides bottom trawling into benthic trawling and demersal trawling. Benthic trawling is towing a net at the very bottom of the ocean and demersal trawling is towing a net just above the benthic zone. Bottom trawling targets both bottom-living fish (groundfish) and semi-pelagic species such as cod, squid, shrimp, and rockfish.

Bottom fishing has operated for over a century on heavily fished grounds such as the North Sea and Grand Banks. While overfishing has long been recognised as causing major ecological changes to the fish community on the Grand Banks, concern has been raised more recently about the damage which benthic trawling inflicts upon seabed communities. A species of particular concern is the slow growing, deep-water coral Lophelia pertusa. This species is home to a diverse community of deep-sea organisms, but is easily damaged by fishing gear. On 17 November 2004, the United Nations General Assembly urged nations to consider temporary bans on high-seas bottom trawling.

Bottom trawling over vulnerable habitats, however, will continue within the Exclusive Fishing Zones of most nations until governments have mapped the location of vulnerable habitats, and taken steps to exclude all bottom trawling activities from these areas.

=== Cyanide fishing ===
Cyanide fishing is a method of collecting live fish mainly for use in aquariums, which involves spraying a sodium cyanide mixture into the desired fish's habitat in order to stun the fish. The practice hurts not only the target population, but also many other marine organisms, including coral and thus coral reefs.

Recent studies have shown that the combination of cyanide use and stress of post capture handling results in mortality of up to 75% of the organisms within less than 48 hours of capture. With such high mortality numbers, a greater number of fish must be caught in order to offset post catch death.

=== Muro-ami ===
Muro-ami is a destructive artisan fishing method employed on coral reefs in Southeast Asia. An encircling net is used with pounding devices, such as large stones or cement blocks fitted on ropes and suspended above the sea by a crane fitted to the vessel. These pounding devices are repeatedly lowered into the area encircled by the net, smashing the coral into small fragments to scare the fish out of their refuges. The crushing of coral heads has been described as having long-lasting and permanently destructive effects.

The Catholic Bishops of the Philippines criticised muro-ami in their 1988 declaration, "What is Happening to Our Beautiful Land?"

=== Shark Finning ===
Shark finning is the removal and retention of a shark's fins and the discarding of the carcass at sea. The International Union for Conservation of Nature (IUCN) has stated that the practice causes the death of millions of sharks each year and threatens many shark populations. A 2024 study estimated that global fishing mortality of sharks rose from at least 76 million to 80 million individuals between 2012 and 2019, about 25 million of them from threatened species. Although the study found that legislation designed to prevent finning did not reduce overall mortality, regional bans on shark fishing or retention showed some success. The study's lead author said finning legislation had been successful in addressing the wasteful practice itself. Nearly 70% of maritime jurisdictions have introduced some measures against finning, little of which existed 20 years earlier. The IUCN has described requiring that sharks be landed with their fins naturally attached as the most straightforward way to implement a finning ban.

=== Ghost Fishing ===
Ghost fishing occurs when fishing gear that has been abandoned, lost or otherwise discarded (ALDFG) continues to catch marine animals. A 2009 report by the FAO and the United Nations Environment Programme estimated that ALDFG makes up around 10% (640,000 tonnes) of all marine litter. Most gear is not discarded deliberately; the report identified adverse weather, gear conflicts, the cost of retrieval, illegal, unreported and unregulated fishing, vandalism or theft, and limited access to shoreside disposal facilities among the causes. It concluded that the problem was worsening because of the growing scale of fishing and the use of durable synthetic materials, and that gillnets and traps or pots may be the most common types of ALDFG, although the available information did not allow global estimates. Lost gear can also pose a hazard to vessels. Recommended responses include better reporting of lost gear and economic incentives for fishers to bring in old, damaged or recovered gear.

=== Push Netting ===
Push netting uses a bag net attached to poles that is pushed forward by hand or by boat through shallow water, usually along or just off the bottom, to catch shrimp, crabs and fish in estuaries, mangrove creeks, shallow bays and coastal areas. Traditional push-net fishing is reported from Indonesia, Malaysia, Myanmar, the Philippines, Singapore and Thailand. Since about 1970 the use of motors has allowed larger nets to be operated farther from shore, and because push nets are non-selective, motorized push-net boats are believed to be degrading marine animal resources and coastal ecology in shallow near-shore areas. In Thailand's, about 60% of the push-net catch was classed as "trash fish", including juveniles of economically important species. Thailand's Department of Fisheries excluded trawling and push netting from a 3km near-shore zone, but the number of push-net boats continued to rise and enforcement proved difficult; a 1995 census counted about 4,000 push-net boats. In Phang-Nga Bay, a ban on push nets was combined with patrols, penalties and a gear exchange programme in which fishers gave up motorized push nets in return for gillnets.

== Impacts ==
=== Ecological ===
Habitat damage is the ecological impact most often associated with destructive fishing in the literature. Bottom-contact gears remove seabed organisms and take years to recover from, and blast fishing can leave reefs as rubble fields that recover slowly or not at all without intervention. Other practices mainly affect populations rather than habitat: shark mortality in global fisheries has continued to rise despite finning regulations, push nets capture large numbers of juvenile fish and shrimp, and lost gear can keep catching animals long after it has been abandoned.

=== Social and Economic ===
Destructive fishing also affects the people who depend on fisheries. Blast fishing has caused long-term damage to coastal livelihoods as well as to reefs. In Southeast Asia, the rapid growth of commercial trawl and purse-seine fleets reduced the competitiveness of small-scale coastal fishers, pushing some toward illegal and damaging methods such as push netting. Conversely, the removal of push nets from Phang-Nga bay was accompanied by a reduction in conflict between push-net and gillnet fishers. Abandoned gear is also a hazard to vessels.

== See also ==
- Environmental impact of fishing
- Environmental issues with coral reefs
- Sustainable fishery
- Bycatch
- Overfishing
- Illegal, unreported and unregulated fishing
- Marine Protected area
- Ghost Net
- Muro-Ami
- Electrofishing
