= Statues of Our Lady of Danajon and Sto. Niño =

Statues of Our Lady of Danajon and Santo Niño, referring to the Virgin Mary and Holy Child (Jesus Christ), were placed underwater in 2010 off the coast of Bohol to stop dynamite fishing in the Danajon Bank, a double barrier reef.

Blast fishing was common in Danajon Bank, leading to destruction of the endangered coral reef—one of only six double barrier reefs in the world. The Bien Unido government and SeaKnights organization placed large statues of the Virgin Mary and Holy Child near the reef in 2010, hoping that the catholicism of the fishermen would prevent potentially harming the statues, thus stopping dynamite fishing. This was successful; these fishing techniques were substantially reduced.
