= Blast fishing =

Using bombs underwater to kill fish

Underwater blast

Blast fishing, fish bombing, dynamite fishing or grenade fishing is a destructive fishing practice using explosives to stun or kill schools of fish for easy collection. This often illegal practice is extremely destructive to the surrounding ecosystem, as the explosion often destroys the underlying habitat (such as coral reefs) that supports the fish. The frequently improvised nature of the explosives used, and undetonated charges, means danger for fishermen and divers as well, with accidents and injuries.

== Description ==
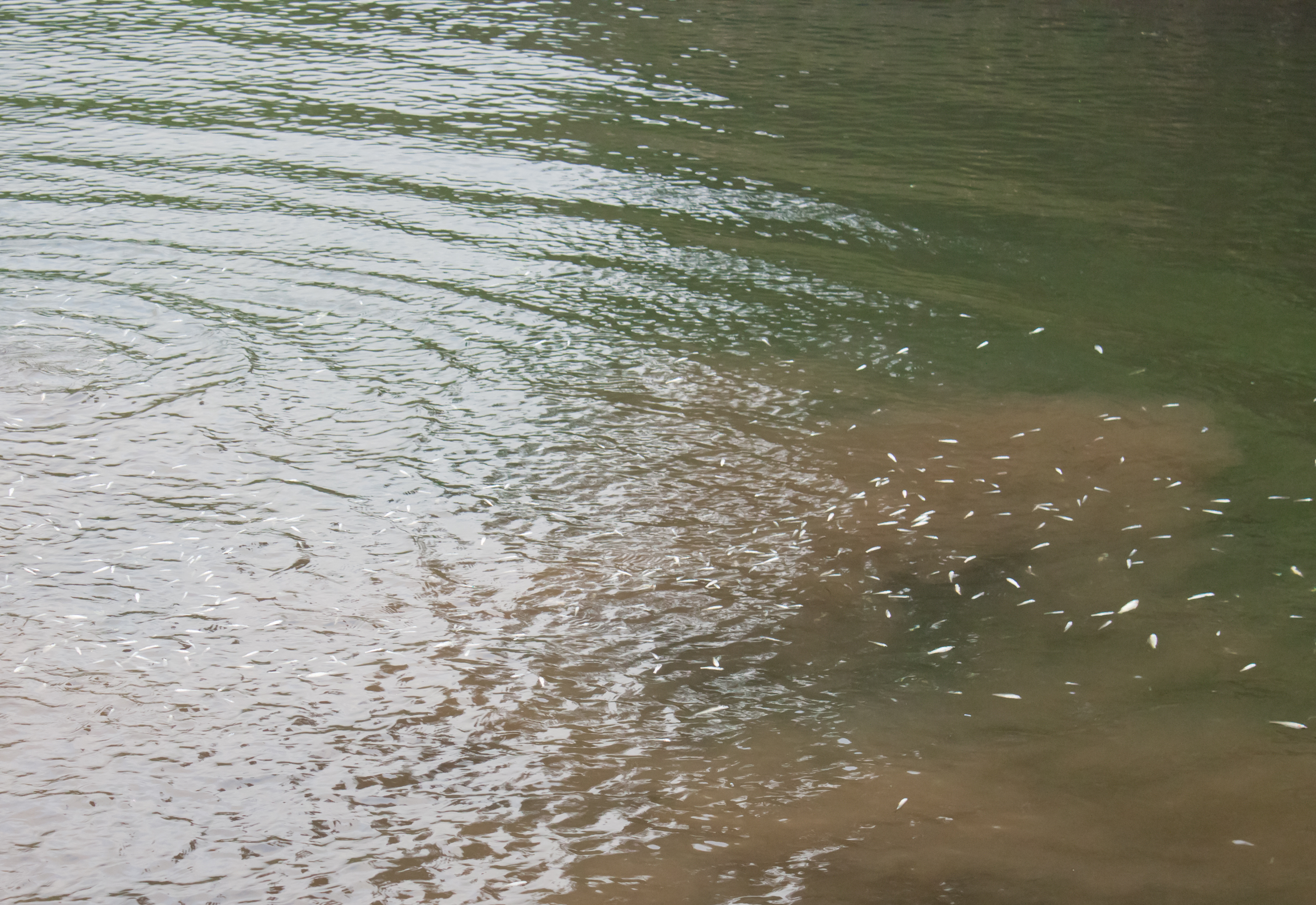
Fish floating immediately after the blast

Although outlawed in some parts of the world, the practice remains widespread in Southeast Asia, as well as in the Aegean Sea and coastal Africa. In the Philippines, where the practice has been well-documented, blast fishing was known prior to World War I, as this activity is mentioned by Ernst Jünger in his book Storm of Steel. One 1999 report estimated that some 70,000 fishermen (12% of the Philippines' total fishermen) engaged in the practice.

Extensive hard-to-patrol coastlines, the lure of lucrative, easy catches, and in some cases outright apathy or corruption on the part of local officials make enforcement of blast fishing bans an ongoing challenge for authorities.

Explosives being prepared for blast fishing

Commercial dynamite or, more commonly, homemade bombs constructed using a glass bottle with layers of powdered potassium nitrate and pebbles or an ammonium nitrate and kerosene mixture are often employed. Such devices, ironically termed expanding bait, may explode prematurely without warning and have been known to injure or kill the person using them, or innocent bystanders.

Underwater shock waves produced by the explosion stun the fish and cause their swim bladders to rupture. This rupturing causes an abrupt loss of buoyancy; a small amount of fish float to the surface, but most sink to the seafloor. The explosions indiscriminately kill large numbers of fish and other marine organisms in the vicinity and can damage or destroy the physical environment, including extensive damage to coral reefs.

=== Inefficiency ===
Blast fishing is inherently inefficient in retrieving killed and stunned fish. For every ten fish killed, only one or two float to the surface, due to damage caused to their otherwise buoyant internal air bladders. The rest sink to the bottom.

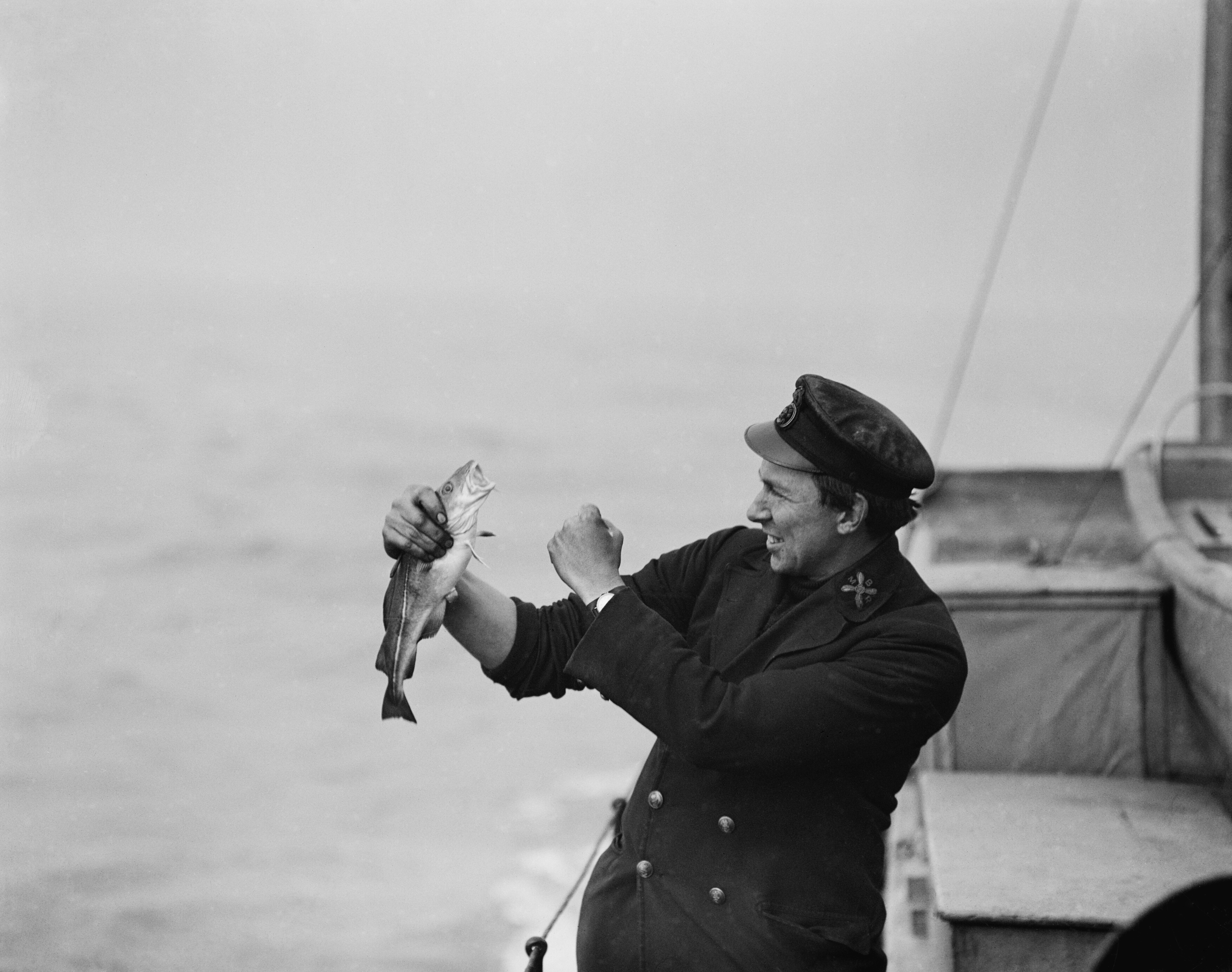
Royal Navy sailor with a fish stunned by a depth charge's explosion off Harwich, 15 April 1918

Shells exploding in the water during naval battles also tend to kill fish with the same effect of blast fishing, only without any systematic attempt to collect the harvest.

=== Impact on coral reefs ===
Researchers believe that destructive fishing practices like blast fishing are one of the biggest threats to the coral reef ecosystems. Blown up coral reefs are no more than rubble fields. The long-term impact associated with blast tanks is that there is no natural recovery of the reefs. Coral reefs are less likely to recover from constant disturbance such as blast fishing than from small disturbance that does not change the physical environment. Blast fishing destroys the calcium carbonate coral skeletons and is one of the continual disruptions of coral reefs. In the Indo-Pacific, the practice of blast fishing is the main cause of coral reef degradation. As a result, weakened rubble fields are formed and fish habitat is reduced.

The damaged coral reefs from blast fishing lead to instant declines in fish species wealth and quantity. Explosives used in blast fishing not only kill fish but also destroy coral skeletons, creating unbalanced coral rubble. The elimination of the fish also eliminates the resilience of the coral reefs to climate change, further hindering their recovery. Single blasts cause reefs to recover over 5–10 years, while widespread blasting, as often practiced, transforms these biodiverse ecosystems into continuous unstable rubble.

== Control ==
=== Community-based enforcement ===
In Tanzania, one of the few methods to help manage blast fishing is a joint approach between fisheries officers and village committees. Working together, they help the enforcement agencies recognize offenders by patrolling the sea as well as providing information collected in the local villages. As a result, this has assisted the enforcement agencies to reduce the occurrence of fish blasting from an average of 8 per day to zero. It has also provided sustainable funding to continue the efficient patrols, a certified planning institution, and suitable training and information to prosecutors and judges.

Similar patrols employed in Indonesia and the Philippines have reduced the amount of blast fishing occurrences there. Based on dialogue with stakeholder groups in Southeast Asia and people of Tanzania and the Philippines, it is evident that firmer enforcement is an effective strategy in managing blast fishing. Many countries have laws regarding blast fishing, but they are not fully implemented. Effective management of Marine Protected Areas (MPAs) is key in the patrolling of illegal fishing areas.

Besides patrols, the restricting or even banning of the sale of ammonium nitrate also makes it much more difficult to produce the explosives that are needed for blast fishing. Another approach is not to restrict or ban the sale of ammonium nitrate, but instead log the people buying large quantities thereof.

Centrally governed enforcement of blast fishing sometimes has limited success, due to resistance of local populations and mistrust of central governments. Bottom up systems based around clearly defined public benefits and education are more beneficial. Effective MPAs have the backing of local leadership and populations due to clearly defined benefits of conservation/ecosystem services. It has also been shown that effective MPAs have local stakeholders that have accurate perceptions of the environmental health of the region. When coastal residents believe that the ecosystem is healthier than indicators such as species diversity, population, and habitat distribution, they may be less likely to support the MPA. Due to this, effective blast fishing community control relies on education campaigns that bring awareness to the relationship between fish stock and fishing rates.

=== Blast monitoring programs and eradication methods ===
This method involves seismic technology developed by the US Government for detecting underwater explosions. Re-adapted for use as background blast monitoring equipment Hong Kong in 1995, first installed in the northeastern waters. Fixed monitoring locations were established in 2006, notably one near to the Jockey Club HSBC WWF Hong Kong Hoi Ha Marine Life Centre. Data from these units were used for discussions with the Marine Police and the Agriculture, Fisheries and Conservation Department (AFCD). The emphasis for these discussions was placed on protection of the Marine Parks, the last Marine Park bombing occurred in Hoi Ha Wan Marine Park in October 1999. With the assistance of community programs from NGO's, education awareness from the AFCD and diligent patrols by the Marine Police Blast fishing was completely eradicated from Hong Kong waters in 2011.

In 2006 background blast monitoring (BBM) with this same equipment was installed at Mabul Island in Sabah, Malaysia. In 2014 the Reef Defenders began an aggressive program to create a network of blast monitoring systems throughout South-East Asia. BBM is important to guide community-based eradication programs, data collected shows that with the use of community-based programs in tandem with BBM, the levels of blast fishing can be reduced by up to 90%. This has already been observed in multiple areas, more importantly, there is a significant reduction in other destructive fishing methods, shown by recovery in fish stocks.

In 2015 and 2017, Stop Fish Bombing! conducted proof of concept demonstrations that ShotSpotter urban gunfire system could be adapted for underwater use in Kota Kinabalu and Semporna, Malaysian Borneo protected Marine Parks. In 2018, Stop Fish Bombing USA published research demonstrating real-time fish blast location in Sabah, Malaysia using a networked hydroacoustic array based on the ShotSpotter gunshot location system. In 2020, Stop Fish Bombing's Malaysia team met with Sabah Parks officials to explain the project approach and provide the ShotSpotter Respond App leading to the first apprehension of Fish Bombers by Marine Police in response to Stop Fish Bombing alert.

== Countries ==
=== Indonesia ===
Blast fishing in Indonesia has been around for over fifty years and continues to damage its coral reefs, as fishermen continue to use explosives or cyanide to kill or stun their prey. Dive operators and conservationists say Indonesia is not doing enough to protect the waters off the Komodo Islands. They say enforcement declined following the exit of a U.S.-based conservation group that helped fight destructive fishing practices. Coral Gardens that were among Asia's most spectacular dive sites were the latest victim of blasting despite being located inside the Komodo National Park, a 500,000-acre reserve and U.N. World Heritage Site. The use of bombs made with kerosene and fertilizer is very popular in the region. While previously Komodo was relatively protected by a cooperative undertaking with TNC (The Nature Conservancy) since the Indonesian government has assumed responsibility for park protection, there has been an upsurge in bombing. During a recent visit to Crystal Bommie, it was found to be 60% destroyed, with freshly overturned coral tables proving recent bombing. In the market in the city of Makassar, an estimated 10 to 40 percent of the fish are caught in this manner. The local fishermen find the technique to be easier and more productive than traditional methods. The goal for the country has been to implement stricter policies and fisheries management programs to limit the killing of the fish as well as the destruction of the marine ecosystem. Forty years ago, blast fishing was practiced with dynamite which was in plentiful supply after World War II. Today, fishermen mostly use homemade bombs that are made from bottles filled with an explosive mixture; weights are also added to make the bottle sink faster underwater. After the bomb explodes, the fish killed or stunned by the shock wave from the explosion are collected.

=== Lebanon ===
Blast fishing or dynamite fishing is growing more common in Lebanon, where fishers make their own homemade dynamite. According to the Safadi Foundation, an organisation which that develops sustainable projects in Lebanon, 5% of fishermen use dynamite fishing. "In Tripoli, this technique was in decline for several years before increasing again in 2019", points out Samer Fatfat, consultant at the Safadi Foundation. "On the beaches of Akkar, it has remained constant."

=== Philippines ===
A 1987 study concluded that blast fishing was then very widespread in the Philippines, estimating that 25% of all municipal fish landings (equivalent to 250,000 metric tons per year) were from blast fishing. Most of the blast fishing is undertaken in the south, near Palawan and the South China Sea. A study conducted in 2002 reported that destructive fishing methods had caused the degradation of about 70% of Philippine coral reefs and reduced annual fisheries production by about 177,500 metric tons in the 1990s.

In 2010, mayor Nino Rey Boniel of Bien Unido town in the province of Bohol, Philippines, built an underwater grotto along the Danajon reef which deteriorated due to excessive dynamite and cyanide use. Through the help of Sea Knight helicopters and Boholano divers, two 14-foot (4.3 m) statues of Mother Mary and Santo Nino (Spanish for Holy Child) were placed on 8 September and 18 October 2010 respectively, 60 feet (18 m) below sea level in order to discourage fishermen from using illegal and destructive methods in fishing and hopefully remind everyone that the sea and its inhabitants are gifts from God that deserves to be treasured and taken care of.

In 2012, the director of the Philippine Bureau of Fisheries and Aquatic Resources declared an “all-out war” against dynamite fishing and other illegal fishing practices.

=== Tanzania ===
In northern Tanzania, blast fishing, which is illegal, has resurfaced in recent years as a key danger to its coral reefs. This has occurred even though major institutions like local communities and the district government have been put in place for enhanced fisheries management. The damage of blast fishing in the area has contributed to unstable coral reefs, discouragement of tourism investors, and a threat to the habitat of coelacanths in the region. Other impacts of blast fishing in the area include reports that citizens have died or lost limbs due to the blasting. The northern part of the country has many beautiful beaches and uninhabited islands. However, many investors feel that tourists are discouraged due to the fish blasting.

In Tanzania, coral reefs are essential for both ecological and socio-economic reasons. They are full of fish, lobsters, prawns, crabs, octopuses, mollusks, and sea cucumbers. In addition, coral reefs are one of the major tourist attractions in Tanzania. The coastal tourism provides a living for the people as well as foreign currency for the country. However, there has been an increase in the people living along the coast which has led to a large demand for fisheries. It has led to overexploitation and destructive fishing practices. Blast fishing has been practiced in Tanzania since the 1960s. It was during the 1980s and 1990s that blast fishing was at its peak in Tanzania. For example, in Mnazi bay, Mtwara, 441 blasts were recorded in two months in 1996, and 100 blasts were witnessed through one six-hour period in Mpovi reef.

=== United States ===
A 1903 short story by Frank Norris titled The Passing of Cock-Eye Blacklock describes efforts to end blast fishing on California's American River.

== See also ==
- Cyanide fishing
- Environmental effects of fishing
- Fish kill
- Marine conservation
