= Catch share =

Fishing regulation

Catch share is a fishery management system that allocates a secure privilege to harvest a specific area or percentage of a fishery's total catch to individuals, communities, or associations. Examples of catch shares are individual transferable quota (ITQs), individual fishing quota (IFQs), territorial use rights for fishing (TURFs), limited access privileges (LAPs), sectors (also known as cooperatives), and dedicated access privileges (DAPs).

Catch shares provide long-term secure privileges to participants and, in theory, an incentive for efficient, sustainable use of fish stocks. Actual outcomes in terms of efficiency and ecological sustainability are varied, based on design and implementation of the program.

Catch share programs generally fall into two categories. Quota-based programs, like ITQs, establish a fishery-wide catch limit, assign portions (or shares) of the catch to participants and hold participants directly accountable to stay within the catch limit.

Area-based programs, like TURFs, allocate a secure, exclusive area to participants and include appropriate controls on fishing mortality that ensure long-term sustainability of the stock. A combination of both quota- and area-based approaches has also been used.

== Background ==
The term "catch share" has taken root recently, but similar management systems providing secure and exclusive access to fishery resources have been in use for many years. Community-based management in Japan's near-shore fisheries dates back to feudal times, and modern individually-allocated catch share programs were first implemented by the state of Wisconsin in the early 1970s for important fish stocks in the Great Lakes. Also, Iceland and the Netherlands implemented catch shares for important stocks in the late 1970s.

The use of catch share programs worldwide has been expanding since the earliest implementations in the 1970s. Some countries, such as Iceland, New Zealand, and Australia, have made catch share programs the default management system.

The United States has implemented the vast majority of its catch share programs in the 21st century. In 2010, catch shares were implemented in the United States Northeast Multispecies fishery and in the United States Atlantic Sea Scallop fishery. In 2011, a catch share program was implemented in the Pacific Coast Groundfish Limited Entry Trawl fishery, which includes fishermen from the states of Washington, Oregon, and California.

Worldwide, there are nearly 200 catch share programs, used in 40 countries, to manage a wide variety of marine and freshwater species including finfish, sharks and crustaceans. Catch shares are used in developing and industrialized nations, artisanal and industrial fleets, and in high- and low-value fisheries.

== Theory ==
Fisheries have historically been treated as a common-pool resource. The dangers of managing fisheries as a common property resource were included in the development of modern theory of fishery economics, first introduced in 1954 by H. Scott Gordon. The theoretical framework showed that the common property nature of fisheries results in competition between individual operators to increase their share of the catch, which can ultimately lead to excessive capital, such as fishing vessels and gear, overfishing and resource wastage. In common property fisheries, individual operators face an incentive to harvest as many fish as quickly as possible to pre-empt the activities by other operators.

Catch shares have been proposed as a potential solution for the common property challenges found in many fisheries and have typically been implemented after a variety of other approaches have failed. Most commercial fisheries begin under open access conditions in which any fisherman is able to enter the fishery, put in effort, and catch fish. However, if fish biomass is no longer able to sustain the amount of fishing effort exerted in the fishery, populations begin to decline, and fishing becomes less profitable. Conventional management systems tend to respond using input controls such as limiting the number of entrants to the fishery, restricting boat and gear capacity, limiting the number of days at sea, and applying catch allowances per trip. However, studies show that the approaches are sometimes ineffective in controlling overall harvest, and managers often implement additional effort-based regulations, output controls, to set strict fishery catch limits. Although catch limits have proven sufficient to sustain a fishery, the management approaches alone do not fundamentally eliminate the incentive for fishermen to compete and increase their share of the catch, which can lead to reduced fishery profitability and dangerous fishing conditions.

By providing secure shares of quota to fishermen, individuals or groups, it is argued that catch share programs have the potential for a fundamental shift of the behavior of fishery participants and incentives for long term stewardship. For example, with quota-based catch shares, the value of the share is directly tied to the landings value of the fishery, which may increase if the health of the fishery improves.

Many catch share programs allow for voluntary trading, a process that allows operators to purchase shares, temporarily or permanently, from those willing to sell or lease shares. Transfers are considered an important component of catch shares because they can promote the most economically-efficient use of the resource.

== Outcomes ==
Empirical research in the past two decades has shown that catch share management of fisheries has a variety of ecological, economic and social outcomes when it is compared with traditional management of fishery inputs. Studies examining the ecological impacts of catch share management show that they stabilize landings and catch limits. Additional research has also shown reduced discards in catch share fisheries.

However, when they are compared to fisheries managed under conventional catch limits, recent studies have demonstrated that catch share offer no advantages to the long term sustainability of a fishery and may exacerbate localized fishery depletion.

The economic impacts of catch shares are well-documented and vary on the program design and fishery goals. Catch share programs has been shown to stop the race for fish that is often experienced in traditionally-managed fisheries. With improved certainty, catch shares have also extended season lengths by providing operators with a longer time period to harvest and the ability to coordinate fishing trips based on market conditions. Empirical evidence has shown that fisheries become more profitable, as the costs of fishing are reduced, and dockside prices for products increase.

Many catch share programs are designed to reduce overcapitalization and active fishing vessels, for a transition from many temporary fishing jobs to fewer but more stable full-time jobs.

== Criticism ==
Changes resulting from a transition to catch shares often improve the economics of the active participants in the fishery, but in some cases, they are considered undesirable from a community or welfare economics perspective. In specific programs, critiques largely focus on tradeoffs, which commonly involve changes in fleet capacity, employment, and aggregation of shares in the fishery.

Reduction in fleet capacity is frequently cited as a negative outcome of catch shares, but such a reduction may be listed as explicit fishery goal. Catch share fisheries can result in greater capitalization of the fishing fleet when the capital required to purchase shares is included. At the same time, catch share programs may experience a change in the structure of employment, transforming from many part-time jobs, paid as a share of landings value, to fewer full-time positions paid by wages. As a result of capacity reduction and employment shifts, programs can result in a reduction in the number of fishery participants.

For example, the Bering Sea crab catch share program in the United States experienced a significant reduction in the number of participants and part-time jobs and is currently operated by fewer full-time positions. Although fishing jobs are longer because of the lengthening of the fishing season, the percentage of total landings value that is paid to employees in this fishery has decreased substantially. As a result, it is argued that the tradeoffs associated with certain catch share programs include increased unemployment, economic contraction of coastal communities, and economic losses to businesses and communities that rely on the fishing fleet.

Although a number of catch share programs do include financing options for small businesses and new entrants, some fishing communities, academics, journalists, and nonprofit organizations have claimed that catch shares serve as a mechanism for the consolidation of fishing rights, often by corporations with better financing capacity than independent fishermen. New institutions are being developed to improve communities' access to shares, allow new entrants into the fishery, and/or keep quota within the community. They include the development and use of permit banks, community license banks and Community Fishing Associations. Programs' design features, including concentration caps, owner-on-board regulations, and trading restrictions, can be used to help alleviate potential unwanted social outcomes. However, it is argued the measures have only mitigated, not prevented, the undesirable social and economic outcomes that accompany catch share programs. Critics have claimed that proliferation of catch share management is reflective of the increasingly strong link between the government and the private sector and that the programs are typically the result of special interest influence over legislation.

== See also ==
- List of harvested aquatic animals by weight
