= Cyanide fishing =

Fishing method that paralyzes fish

Cyanide fishing is a method of collecting live fish, mainly for use in aquariums, which involves spraying a sodium cyanide mixture into a habitat in order to incapacitate the fish there. This practice affects not only the target population, it also has negative and damaging effects on many other marine organisms, including coral and coral reefs.

== History and geography ==
Cyanide fishing is practiced mainly in saltwater fishing regions of Southeast Asia. Since the practice of cyanide fishing was never widely publicised or officially approved, its origins are uncertain; but it is believed to have originated in the 1950s in the Philippines. Later in the twentieth century, the practice was adopted by some fishing operators in Indonesia, Thailand, the Maldives, and Taiwan, among others. Cyanide fishing was initially developed to stun and capture fish for aquariums and collectors, but it was soon also used for catching fish for human consumption. It is illegal in many of the countries in which it is practiced, although these laws are often minimally enforced. Grouper, wrasse, and coral trout are among the more popular species of fish captured through cyanide fishing.

The World Resources Institute (WRI) determined that approximately 20% of the live fish traded on the Philippine market in 1996 were caught using cyanide; assuming this is reflective of southeast Asian practice as a whole, environmental engineer David Dzombak estimates that 12,000 to 14,000 short tons (10,710 to 12,500 long tons; 10,890 to 12,700 metric tons) of live food fish are caught each year using this method.

Colourful, particularly eccentric, and therefore rare coral reef fish are packed into plastic bags; up to two thirds of these fish die during transport. Estimates suggest 70% to 90% of aquarium fish exported from the Philippines are caught with cyanide. Due to the post-capture handling stress and the effects of the cyanide, fish are bound to have a shorter life-span than usual in aquariums. According to an interview with experienced aquarium owners, they were willing to pay more for net-caught fish, because of the higher survival rate. They also said they would not trust an ecolabelling system, which can be misleading.

The basis for this illegal fishing method is, among others, the rising demand for live fish in the higher-class restaurants of the big cities, particularly in rich, nearby countries, which pay increasingly high prices. The extremely low wages of the fishermen in remote, underdeveloped areas, where there are no alternative sources of income, drive them to endure the health risks and possible prosecution.

The practice has led to conflict between Chinese fishermen and the Taiwanese coast guard.

== Method ==
The fishermen dive into the sea, usually without artificial breathing aids, although some use a highly dangerous apparatus (commonly garden hose surface-fed from the type of air compressor commonly used to power jackhammers). When they reach the coral reefs, they spray the poison between the individual layers, after which the yield is collected. Edible fish, of which a number are sold for general consumption, are first placed for ten to fourteen days in clean water for 'rinsing'. Recent studies have shown that the combination of cyanide use and stress of post capture handling results in mortality of up to 75% of the organisms within less than 48 hours of capture. With such high mortality numbers, a greater number of fish must be caught in order to supplement post-catch death.

Cases have been reported of fishermen dumping drums of concentrated cyanide in places where fishing is difficult or economic times are hard. Such high concentrations normally kill most of the haul, but in these cases, the objective is no longer to catch live fish, but to catch the largest amount possible.

== Mechanism ==
In seawater, sodium cyanide breaks down into sodium and cyanide ions. Cyanide inhibits cellular respiration, leading to death. Coral polyps, young fish, and spawn are most vulnerable; adult fish can take somewhat higher doses. The use of cyanide is known to cause mortality on laboratory corals in measured doses, however these data are very difficult to quantify in regard to wild populations.

== Habitat destruction ==
Many fishing and diving areas across the whole of South East Asia, already severely damaged from the impact of dynamite fishing, have been ruined or totally lost through cyanide fishing. Cyanide concentration slows photosynthesis in zooxanthellae, which results in coral reefs losing colour; it also eliminates one of their major food sources. Even at very low doses, cyanide results in higher mortality levels among corals.
