= Outline of fisheries =

Overview of and topical guide to fisheries

The following outline is provided as an overview of and topical guide to fisheries:

Fishery – entity engaged in raising or harvesting fish which is determined by some authority to be a fishery. According to the UN Food and Agriculture Organization (FAO), a fishery is typically defined in terms of the "people involved, species or type of fish, area of water or seabed, method of fishing, class of boats, purpose of the activities or a combination of the foregoing features". The definition often includes a combination of fish and fishers in a region, the latter fishing for similar species with similar gear types.

== Fisheries by type ==
- Krill fishery
- Shrimp fishery

=== Wild fisheries ===
- Wild fisheries
- Mixed stock fishery
- Biomass (ecology)
- Littoral zone
- Red tide
- Dead zone (ecology)
- Water column
- Marine snow
- Continental shelf pump
- Upwelling
- Humboldt Current
- Ocean gyre

==== Ocean habitats ====
- Aquatic ecosystem
- Continental shelf
- Neritic zone
- Littoral zone
- Intertidal
- Pelagic zone
- Demersal zone
- Benthic zone
- Benthos
- Coral reefs
- Estuary
- Seamount
- Fishing banks

=== Farmed fisheries ===
- Fish farm
- Broodstock
- Fish stock
- Fish hatchery
- Fish stocking
- Salmon aquaculture
- Aquaculture of catfish
- Aquaculture of tilapia
- Freshwater prawn farm
- Shrimp farm
- Oyster farming
- tailwater
- Hirudiculture
- National Fish Hatchery System
- Sea louse
- infectious hypodermal and hematopoietic necrosis
- Taura syndrome
- White spot syndrome
- Yellowhead disease

==== Aquaculture ====
- Aquaculture
- Mariculture
- Algaculture
- Fish farming - Raising fish commercially in tanks or enclosures such as fish ponds, usually for food.
- Aquaponics
- integrated multi-trophic aquaculture
- Inland saline aquaculture
- Raceway (aquaculture)
- Geothermal energy and aquaculture
- Aquaculture engineering
- Fisheries and aquaculture research institutes

== Fisheries science ==
Fisheries science – Fisheries science is the academic discipline of managing and understanding fisheries.

- Population dynamics of fisheries –
- Shifting baseline – the way significant changes to a system are measured against previous reference points, which themselves may represent significant changes from the original state of the system.
- Fish stock – Fish stocks are subpopulations of a particular species of fish, for which intrinsic parameters are the only significant factors in determining population dynamics, while extrinsic factors are considered to be insignificant.
- Fish mortality – Fish mortality is a term widely used in fisheries science that denotes the loss of fish from a stock through death.
- Condition index – The condition index in fish is a way to measure the overall health of a fish by comparing its weight with the typical weight of other fish of the same kind and of the same length.
- Stock assessment – Stock assessments provide fisheries managers with the information that is used in the regulation of a fish stock.
- Fish measurement – Fish measurement is the measuring of the length of individual fish and of various parts of their anatomy.
- Fish counter – Automatic fish counters are automatic devices for measuring the number of fish passing along a particular river in a particular period of time.
- Data storage tag – A data storage tag, also sometimes known as an archival tag, is a data logger that uses sensors to record data at predetermined intervals.
- Catch per unit effort – In fisheries and conservation biology, the catch per unit effort is an indirect measure of the abundance of a target species.
- Otolith microchemical analysis – Otolith microchemical analysis is a technique used in fisheries management and fisheries biology to delineate stocks and characterize movements, and natal origin of fish.
- Biomass – Biomass, in ecology, is the mass of living biological organisms in a given area or ecosystem at a given time.
- Fisheries acoustics – Fisheries acoustics includes a range of research and practical application topics using acoustical devices as sensors in aquatic environments.
- Acoustic tag – An acoustic tag is a small sound-emitting device that allows the detection and/or remote tracking of fish in three dimensions.
- EcoSCOPE – The ecoSCOPE is an optical sensor system, deployed from a small remotely operated vehicle or fibre optic cable, to investigate behavior and microdistribution of small organisms in the ocean.
- Age class structure – Age class structure in fisheries and wildlife management is a part of population assessment.
- Trophic level –
- Trophic cascades –
- Match/mismatch hypothesis – The match/mismatch hypothesis was first described by David Cushing .
- Fisheries and climate change – * Brander, Keith "Impacts of climate change on fisheries" Journal of Marine Systems, 79: 389–402.
- Marine biology – Marine biology is the scientific study of organisms in the ocean or other marine or brackish bodies of water.
- Aquatic ecosystems Aquatic ecosystem
- Bioeconomics – Bioeconomics is closely related to the early development of theories in fisheries economics, initially in the mid-1950s by Canadian economists Scott Gordon and Anthony Scott . Their ideas used recent achievements in biological fisheries modelling, primarily the works by Schaefer on establishing a formal relationship between fishing activities and biological growth through mathematical modelling confirmed by empirical studies, and also relates itself to ecology and the environment and resource protection.
- EconMult – EconMult is a general fleet model to be used in fisheries modelling.
- Ecopath – Ecopath with Ecosim is a free ecosystem modelling software suite, initially started at NOAA by Jeffrey Polovina, but has since primarily been developed at the UBC Fisheries Centre of the University of British Columbia.
- FishBase – FishBase is a comprehensive database of information about fish species . It is the largest and most extensively accessed online database on adult finfish on the web. Over time it has "evolved into a dynamic and versatile ecological tool", widely cited in scholarly publications.
- Census of Marine Life – The Census of Marine Life was a global network of researchers in more than 80 nations engaged in a 10-year scientific initiative to assess and explain the diversity, distribution, and abundance of life in the oceans.
- OSTM – The Ocean Surface Topography Mission on the Jason-2 satellite is an international Earth observation satellite mission that continues the sea surface height measurements begun in 1992 by the joint NASA/CNES TOPEX/Poseidon mission and followed by the NASA/CNES Jason-1 mission launched in 2001.
- Marine conservation
- Environmental impact of fishing
- Fisheries and aquaculture research institutes
- Global Ocean Ecosystem Dynamics (GLOBEC)

=== Wild fisheries science ===
Wild fishery – a fishery is an area with an associated fish or aquatic population which is harvested for its commercial value. Fisheries can be marine or freshwater. They can also be wild or farmed.

- Ocean fisheries –
- Diversity of fish – Fish are very diverse and are categorized in many ways.
- Coastal fish – Coastal fish, also called offshore fish or neritic fish, are fish that inhabit the sea between the shoreline and the edge of the continental shelf.
- Coral reef fish – Coral reef fish are fish which live amongst or in close relation to coral reefs.
- Demersal fish – Demersal fish live on or near the bottom of the sea or lakes.
- Forage fish – Forage fish, also called prey fish or bait fish, are small pelagic fish which are preyed on by larger predators for food.
- Pelagic fish – Pelagic fish live near the surface or in the water column of coastal, ocean and lake waters, but not on the bottom of the sea or the lake.
- Cod fisheries – Cod fisheries are fisheries for cod.
- Crab fisheries – Crab fisheries are fisheries which capture or farm crabs.
- Eel fisheries – The spawning area of the Japanese eel, Anguilla japonica, has also been precisely located to be to the west of the Suruga seamount
- Krill fisheries – The krill fishery is the commercial fishery of krill, small shrimp-like marine animals that live in the oceans worldwide.
- Lobster fisheries – Lobster fishing, sometimes called lobstering, is the commercial or recreational harvesting of marine lobsters, spiny lobsters or crayfish.
- Shrimp and prawn fisheries –
- Eel ladder – An eel ladder is type of fish ladder designed to help eels swim past barriers, such as dams and weirs or even natural barriers, to reach upriver feeding grounds.
- Fish ladder – A fish ladder, also known as a fishway, fish pass or fish steps, is a structure on or around artificial barriers to facilitate diadromous fishes' natural migration.
- Fish screen – A fish screen is designed to prevent fish from swimming or being drawn into an aqueduct, cooling water intake, dam or other diversion on a river, lake or waterway where water is taken for human use.
- Migration – Many types of fish migrate on a regular basis, on time scales ranging from daily to annually or longer, and over distances ranging from a few metres to thousands of kilometres.
- Salmon run – The salmon run is the time when salmon, which have migrated from the ocean, swim to the upper reaches of rivers where they spawn on gravel beds.
- Sardine run – The sardine run of southern Africa occurs from May through July when billions of sardines – or more specifically the Southern African pilchard Sardinops sagax – spawn in the cool waters of the Agulhas Bank and move northward along the east coast of South Africa.
- Shoaling and schooling – In biology, any group of fish that stay together for social reasons are shoaling, and if the group is swimming in the same direction in a coordinated manner, they are schooling .
- Marine habitats – The sedimentologist Francis Shepard classified coasts as primary or secondary.
- Marine snow – In the deep ocean, marine snow is a continuous shower of mostly organic detritus falling from the upper layers of the water column.
- Water column – A water column is a conceptual column of water from surface to bottom sediments.
- Upwelling – Upwelling is an oceanographic phenomenon that involves wind-driven motion of dense, cooler, and usually nutrient-rich water towards the ocean surface, replacing the warmer, usually nutrient-depleted surface water.
- Humboldt current – The Humboldt Current, also known as the Peru Current, is a cold, low-salinity ocean current that flows north-westward along the west coast of South America from the southern tip of Chile to northern Peru.
- Algal blooms algal bloom
- Dead zones – Dead zones are hypoxic areas in the world's oceans, the observed incidences of which have been increasing since oceanographers began noting them in the 1970s.
- Fish kill – The term fish kill, known also as fish die-off and as fish mortality, is a localized die-off of fish populations which may also be associated with more generalised mortality of aquatic life. The most common cause is reduced oxygen in the water, which in turn may be due to factors such as drought, algae bloom, overpopulation, or a sustained increase in water temperature.

== Fisheries Management ==
Fisheries management – Fisheries management draws on fisheries science in order to find ways to protect fishery resources so sustainable exploitation is possible.

- sustainability
- conservation – Marine conservation, also known as marine resources conservation, is the protection and preservation of ecosystems in oceans and seas.
- Monitoring control and surveillance – Monitoring, control and surveillance, in the context of fisheries, is defined by the Food and Agriculture Organization of the United Nations as a broadening of traditional enforcing national rules over fishing, to the support of the broader problem of fisheries management
  - Catch reporting
  - Vessel monitoring system – Vessel monitoring systems are used in commercial fishing to allow environmental and fisheries regulatory organizations to monitor, minimally, the position, time at a position, and course and speed of fishing vessels.
  - Fishery Resources Monitoring System – The Fishery Resources Monitoring System is a partnership of intergovernmental fisheries organizations that share a wide range of high-quality information on the global monitoring and management of marine fishery resources.
  - Fisheries observer – A fisheries observer is an independent specialist who serves on board commercial fishing vessels, or in fish processing plants and other platforms, and is employed by a fisheries observer program, either directly by a government agency or by a third party contractor.
  - Illegal, unreported and unregulated fishing – Illegal fishing takes place where vessels operate in violation of the laws of a fishery.
- Magnuson–Stevens Act –

=== Quotas ===
- Catch share – Catch share is a term used for fishery management systems that dedicate a secure privilege to harvest a specific area or percentage of a fishery's total allowable catch to individuals, communities or associations.
- Individual fishing quota – Individual fishing quotas also known as "individual transferable quotas" are one kind of catch share, a means by which many governments regulate fishing.
- Minimum landing size – The minimum landing size is the smallest length at which it is legal to keep or sell a fish.
- Bycatch – The term “bycatch” is usually used for fish caught unintentionally in a fishery while intending to catch other fish.
- Discards – portion of a catch of fish which is not retained on board during commercial fishing operations and is returned, often dead or dying, to the sea.
- Incidental catch – Incidental catch is a term, used in fisheries, to refer to that part of the catch which was not originally targeted, but was caught and retained anyway.
- Cetacean bycatch – Cetacean bycatch is the incidental capture of non-target cetacean species by fisheries.
- Turtle excluder device – A turtle excluder device or TED is a specialized device that allows a captured sea turtle to escape when caught in a fisherman's net.
- EU quotas – The Common Fisheries Policy is the fisheries policy of the European Union .
- European Fishery MLS
- Exclusive economic zone – Under the law of the sea, an exclusive economic zone is a seazone over which a state has special rights over the exploration and use of marine resources, including production of energy from water and wind

=== Sustainability ===
Sustainable fishery

- Maximum sustainable yield – In population ecology and economics, maximum sustainable yield or MSY is theoretically, the largest yield that can be taken from a species' stock over an indefinite period.
- Sustainable seafood – Sustainable seafood is seafood from either fished or farmed sources that can maintain or increase production in the future without jeopardizing the ecosystems from which it was acquired.
- Overfishing – Overfishing is the act whereby fish stocks are depleted to unacceptable levels, regardless of water body size.
- Environmental effects of fishing
- Environmental impact of fishing
- Fishing down the food web – Fishing down the food web is the process whereby fisheries in a given ecosystem, "having depleted the large predatory fish on top of the food web, turn to increasingly smaller species, finally ending up with previously spurned small fish and invertebrates."
- Destructive fishing practices – The phrase destructive fishing practices has been featured in international fisheries literature for around three decades.
- Future of Marine Animal Populations – The Future of Marine Animal Populations project was one of the core projects of the international Census of Marine Life .
- The Sunken Billions – The Sunken Billions is a study jointly published in 2008 by the World Bank and by the Food and Agriculture Organization of the United Nations .
- End of the Line – The End of The Line: How Overfishing Is Changing the World And What We Eat is a book by journalist Charles Clover about overfishing.

=== Conservation ===
- Marine Protected Area –
- Marine reserve – A marine reserve is an area of the sea which has legal protection against fishing or development.
- Marine conservation – Marine conservation, also known as marine resources conservation, is the protection and preservation of ecosystems in oceans and seas.
- Marine conservation activism – Marine conservation activism refers to the efforts of non-governmental organizations and individuals to bring about social and political change in the area of marine conservation.
- Salmon conservation – Conservation versus Restoration
- Shark sanctuary – A shark sanctuary is an area that forbids commercial fishing operations from catching any shark.

== Fishery-related organizations ==
- Asia-Pacific Fishery Commission
- Association for Professional Observers
- Australian Fisheries Management Authority
- Bobs Farm, New South Wales
- Central Institute of Fisheries Education
- Chinese Academy of Fishery Sciences
- CSIRO Marine and Atmospheric Research
- Deep Sea Conservation Coalition
- Defying Ocean's End – Defying Ocean's End is a global agenda for action in marine conservation compiled in a 2004 Island Press book.
- European Fisheries Control Agency
- Federation of Irish Fishermen
- Fishermen's Union Trading Co.
- Food and Agriculture Organization
- Friend of the Sea – Friend of the Sea is a project for the certification and promotion of seafood from sustainable fisheries and sustainable aquaculture. It is the only certification scheme which, with the same logo, certifies both wild and farmed seafood.
- Frozen at Sea Fillets Association
- Got Mercury?
- Great Lakes Fishery Commission
- Greenpeace – Greenpeace is a non-governmental environmental organization with offices in over forty countries and with an international coordinating body in Amsterdam, the Netherlands. Greenpeace states its goal is to "ensure the ability of the Earth to nurture life in all its diversity" and focuses its campaigning on worldwide issues such as global warming, deforestation, overfishing, commercial whaling and anti-nuclear issues.
- Gulf States Marine Fisheries Commission
- HERMIONE – Hotspot Ecosystem Research and Man's Impact On European Seas, or HERMIONE, is an international multidisciplinary project, started in April 2009, that studies deep-sea ecosystems. HERMIONE scientists study the distribution of hotspot ecosystems, how they function and how they interconnect, partially in the context of how these ecosystems are being affected by climate change and impacted by humans through fishing, resource extraction, seabed installations and pollution.
- Ichthyological Society of Hong Kong
- International Commission for the Conservation of Atlantic Tunas
- International Council for the Exploration of the Sea
- International Seafood Sustainability Foundation – International Seafood Sustainability Foundation was formed in 2009 as a global, non-profit partnership among the tuna industry, scientists and World Wide Fund for Nature.
- International Whaling Commission
- Karnataka Veterinary, Animal and Fisheries Sciences University
- Kerala University of Fisheries and Ocean Studies
- Kyodo Senpaku
- Leibniz Institute of Marine Sciences
- Leigh Marine Laboratory
- Maharashtra Animal and Fishery Sciences University
- Marine Conservation Alliance
- Marine Stewardship Council – The Marine Stewardship Council is an independent non-profit organization which sets a standard for sustainable fishing.
- Matsyafed
- National Coalition for Marine Conservation
- National Fish Habitat Initiative
- National Fisheries Institute
- National Marine Fisheries Service
- North American Native Fishes Association
- North Atlantic Marine Mammal Commission
- North Atlantic Salmon Conservation Organization
- North Pacific Marine Science Organization
- Northwest Atlantic Fisheries Organization
- Northwest Atlantic Marine Alliance
- Oceana – Oceana is the largest international ocean conservation and advocacy organization.
- Pacific Whiting Conservation Cooperative
- PROFISH – PROFISH is a global program on sustainable fisheries established by the World Bank in 2005.
- Regional Fisheries Management Organisation
- Sea Around Us Project – The Sea Around Us Project is an international research group based at the University of British Columbia Fisheries Centre that is devoted to studying the impacts of fisheries on the world's marine ecosystems.
- Sea Shepherd Conservation Society – The Sea Shepherd Conservation Society is a non-profit, marine conservation organization based in Friday Harbor on San Juan Island, Washington in the United States.
- SeaChoice – SeaChoice is a program of Sustainable Seafood Canada that uses the Monterey Bay Aquarium Seafood Watch recommendations to raise consumer awareness about the importance of buying seafood from sustainable sources.
- Seafood Choices Alliance
- Seafood Watch – Seafood Watch is one of the best known sustainable seafood advisory lists, and has influenced similar programs around the world.
- SeaWeb
- Shellfish Association of Great Britain
- South East Atlantic Fisheries Organisation
- The Ocean Conservancy
- U.S. Regional Fishery Management Councils
- West Bengal University of Animal and Fishery Sciences
- Western and Central Pacific Fisheries Commission
- Work in Fishing Convention 2007
- World Fishing Exhibition
- World Oceans Day
- WorldFish Center – The WorldFish Center, a CGIAR Consortium Research Center, is an international, non-profit research organization dedicated to reducing poverty and hunger by improving fisheries and aquaculture.
- Worshipful Company of Fishmongers
- Yakima Klickitat Fisheries Project

== Fisheries personalities ==
- Walther Herwig
- Johan Hjort
- Bruno Hofer
- Leo Margolis
- R. J. McKay
- Harald Rosenthal
- Georg Ossian Sars
- Tore Schweder
- von Bertalanffy
- Daniel Pauly
- Ed Ricketts

== Related issues ==
- CalCOFI – CalCOFI is a multi-agency partnership formed in 1949 to investigate the collapse of the sardine population off California.
- Marine pollution – Marine pollution occurs when harmful, or potentially harmful effects, can result from the entry into the ocean of chemicals, particles, industrial, agricultural and residential waste, noise, or the spread of invasive organisms.
- Mercury in fish – * Rasmussen RS, Nettleton J and Morrissey MT "A Review of Mercury in Seafood: special focus on tuna" Journal of Aquatic Food Product Technology, 14 : 71–100.
- Shark finning – Shark finning refers to the removal and retention of shark fins, accompanied by the discarding of the rest of the shark body into the ocean.

== See also ==
- Outline of fishing
- Fish farming
- Aquaculture
- Kelp
- Fish shoaling
- Fish migration
- Sardine run
- Fish types
- Fishing down the food web
