= Coded wire tag =

Device used to tag and track animals

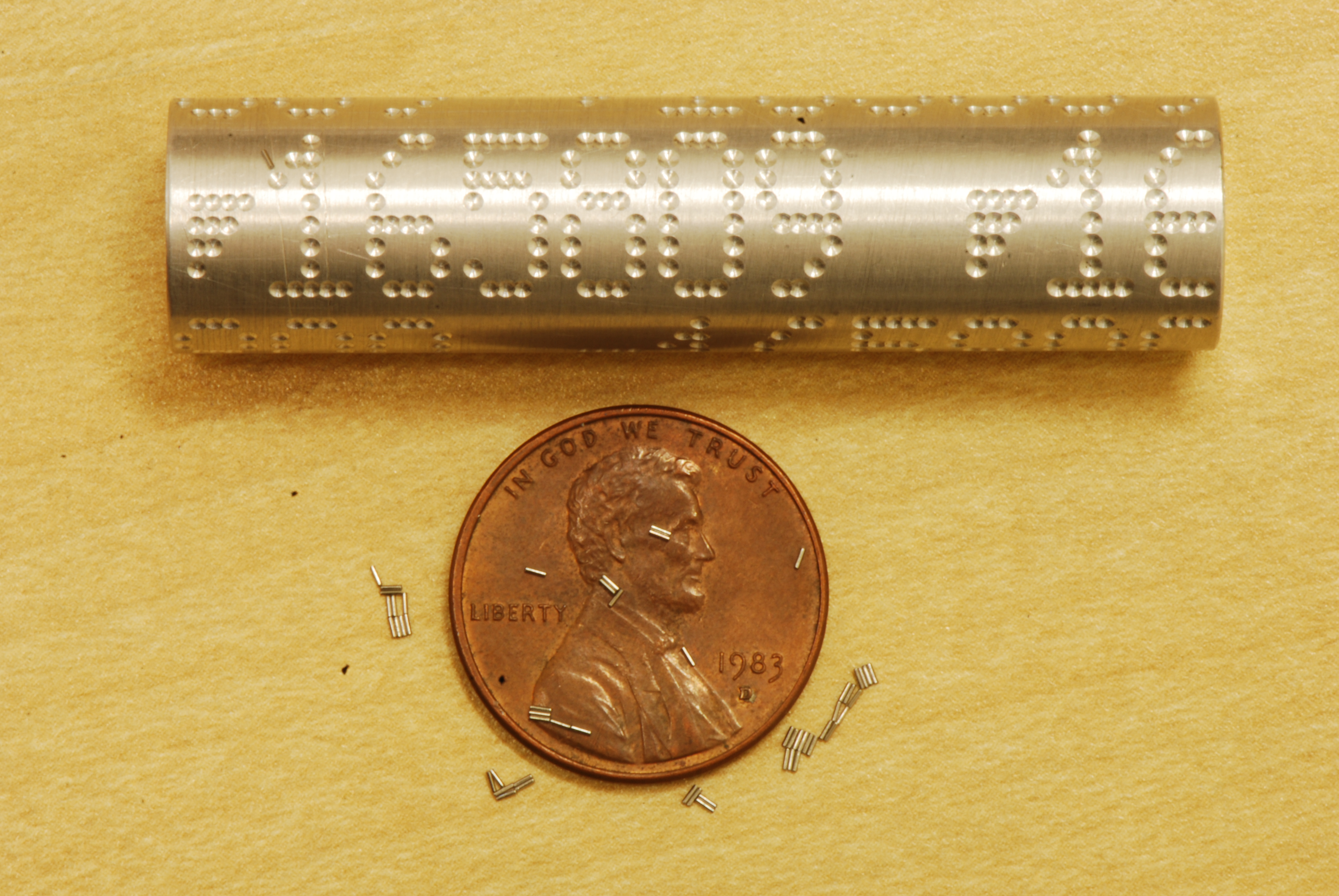
Giant model coded wire tag with actual tags, penny for scale

A coded wire tag (CWT) is an animal tagging device, most often used for identifying batches of fish. It consists of a length of magnetized stainless steel wire 0.25 mm in diameter and typically 1.1 mm long. The tag is marked with rows of numbers denoting specific batch or individual codes. The tag is usually injected into the snout or cheek of a fish so that it may be tracked for research or fisheries management.

Fish, crustaceans, insects, gastropods, and many other animals have been successfully tagged with Coded Wire Tags. The coded wire tag program in the Pacific Northwest has been described as the largest animal tagging program in history, with over 1 billion salmon tagged.

== Data retrieval ==
The CWT is not visible once inside the fish; its presence is detected at close range by using a handheld wand or tunnel type detector that can sense the magnetized metal. A number code unique to either a group of fish or an individual fish is etched into the surface of the CWT, and to read the code the fish is killed first so that the tag can be removed and inspected under a microscope. Upon insertion, information about the fish such as hatching date, release date, location, species, sex, and length are recorded along with the corresponding tag code into a database, so that codes on recovered tags can be matched to information within that database. Coded wire tags have been used to research fish species from over 40 different families.

== History ==
Coded wire tags were first introduced in the 1960s as an alternative to fin clipping. The first CWTs used colored stripes and allowed about 5000 different color combinations to uniquely identify groups of tags. The next development was binary codes marked on tags by electrical discharge machining in 1971. Binary codes allowed 250,000 unique code combinations. The sequential coded wire tag was introduced in 1985, which allowed tags with sequentially increasing numbers, or codes, to be cut from the same spool of wire, so that individual or small groups of fish could be uniquely identified.

With advancements in laser technology, digits could be etched on tags, which caused the switch from binary to decimal codes. Currently, coded wire tags are marked using a decimal system, which is a row of numbers. The decimal system allows 1 million unique codes for batch tags, and 100,000 unique codes for individual sequential tags.

== Use ==
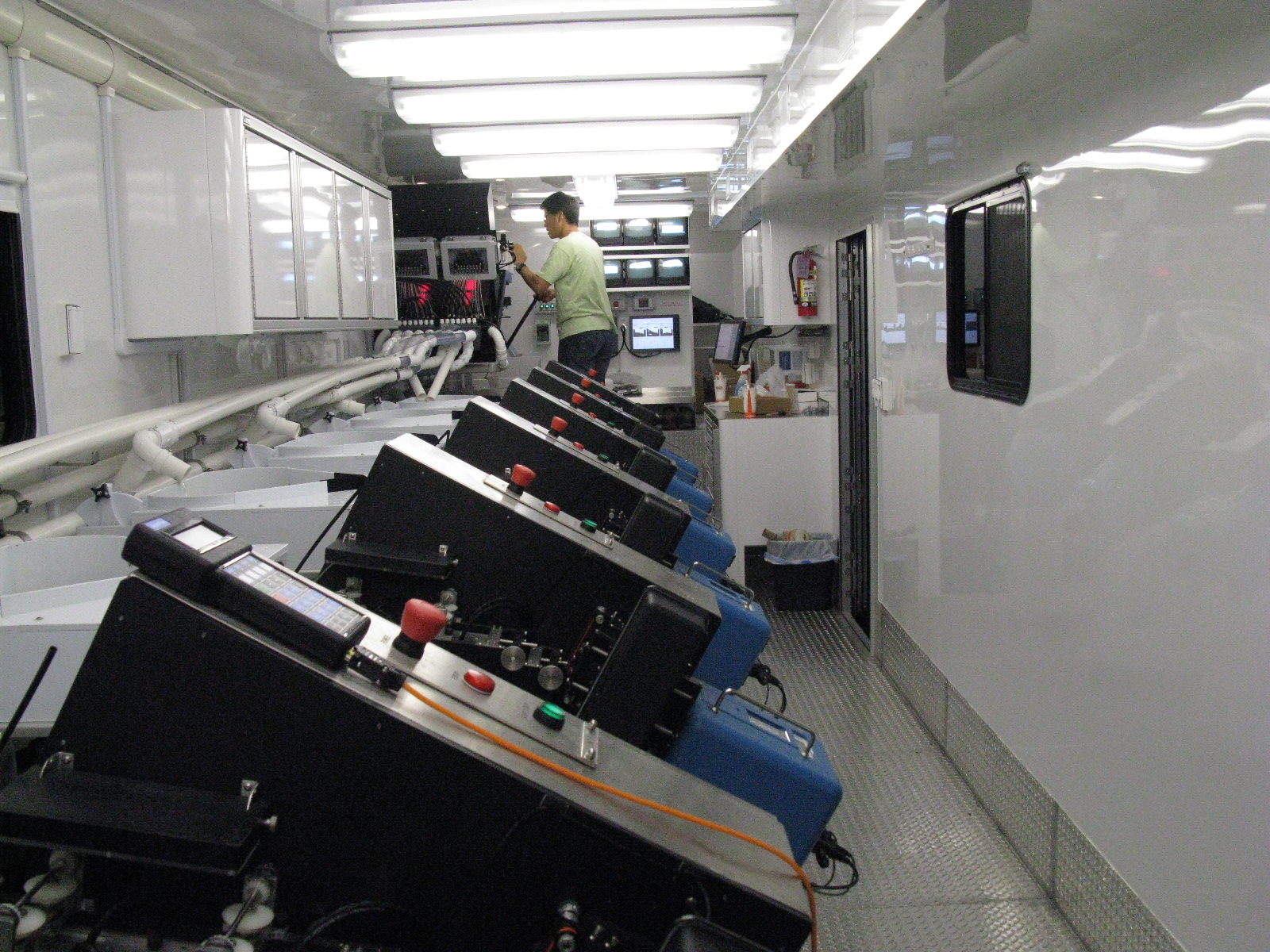
View inside autotrailer.

Salmon fry weighing less than 1 gram can be successfully tagged, and different sized tags are used depending on the length of the fish to be tagged. A small handheld injector is portable and can be used where small numbers of fish will be tagged. For large scale tagging projects, an automatic tag injector is used, which cuts and magnetizes the wire. In manual tagging, a juvenile fish's snout is pressed into a molded guide so that the tag will be positioned correctly and the tag is automatically injected by the machine. These automatic injectors can be integrated into a fully automated process inside of a mobile trailer called an AutoFish trailer, or "autotrailer", where fish are mechanically sorted, adipose fin clipped, and tagged. Autotrailers do not require anesthetic or the fish to be removed from water. When fish are tagged, their tag code and other information such as release date and location are entered into a database. In the Pacific Northwest, the Regional Mark Information System is used.

== Applications ==
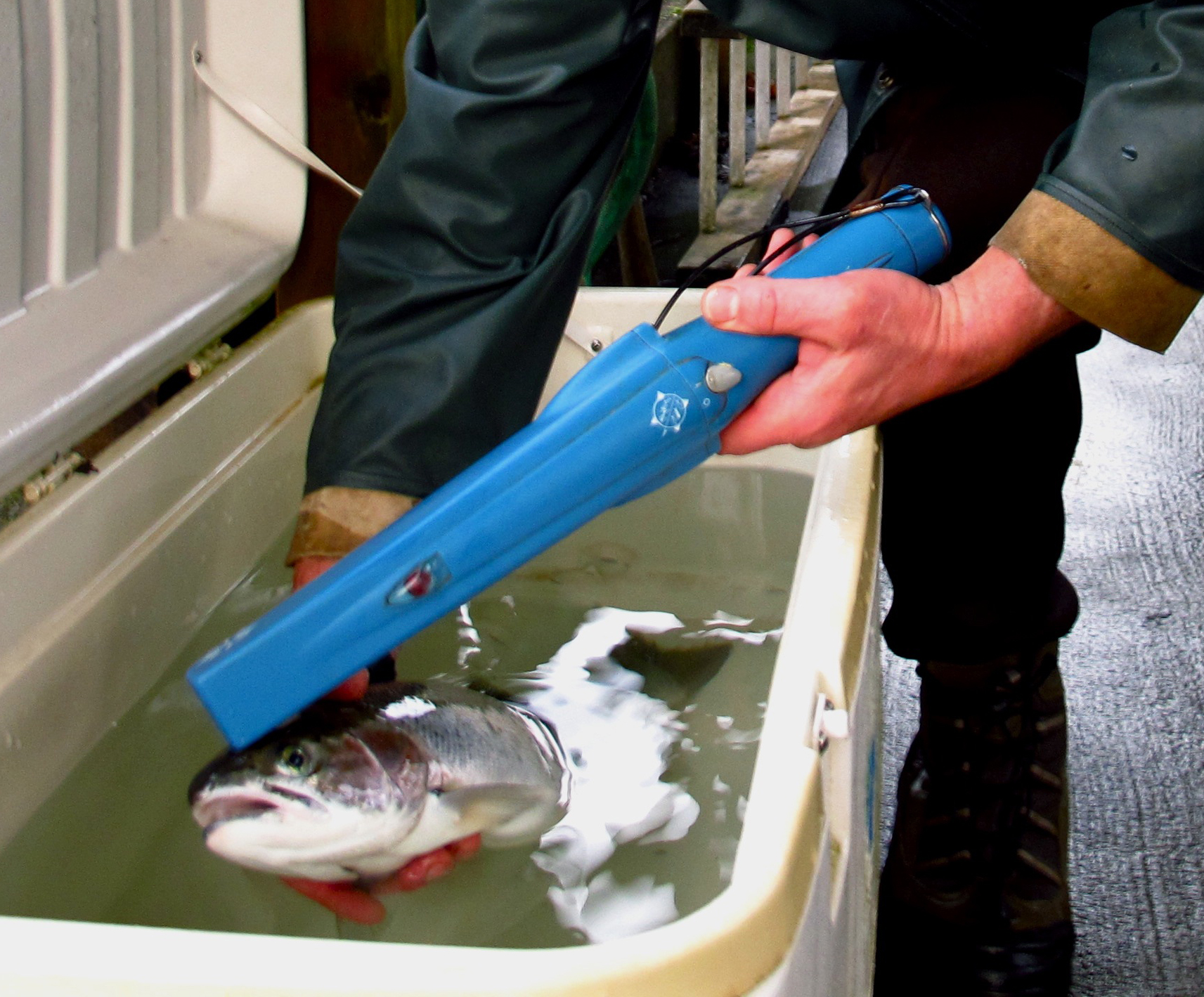
The head of this steelhead is being scanned with a CWT wand.

Coded wire tags are used to track groups or individual fish for research and fishery management purposes. Commonly tagged species are coho, chinook, steelhead, chum, sockeye, and pink salmon. In Alaska, British Columbia, Washington, Oregon, and California, the adipose fin is removed from CWT tagged salmon as a visual indicator of the presence of the tag. However, in Washington the adipose fin is removed from nearly all hatchery salmon in mass marking programs to distinguish them from wild fish. In order to study the impacts of mark selective fisheries, where marked hatchery salmon are selected by fisheries rather than unmarked wild fish, some fish receive what is called a double index tag. In double index tagging, some hatchery fish are tagged with a CWT but do not have their adipose fin clipped. This means that the adipose fin clip cannot always be depended on as an indicator that a tag is there, since some fish with adipose fin clips will not actually have tags, and some fish with intact adipose fins will have tags. In places where mass marking or double index tagging is practiced, an electronic detector such as a wand or tunnel must be used to determine if a tag is present so the snout can be dissected to read the tag. Electronic tag detection is used in Washington, Oregon, and Idaho. Alaska and California depend on the adipose fin clip to indicate the presence of a tag.

Coded wire tags have also been used to track the diet of piscivorous birds, because when the head of a tagged fish is eaten, the tag passes through the bird's digestive system. CWTs have also been used in Japan.

== See also ==
- Radio-frequency identification
- Acoustic tag
- Data storage tag
- Pop-up satellite archival tag
