= Animal migration tracking =

Used to study animals' behavior in the wild

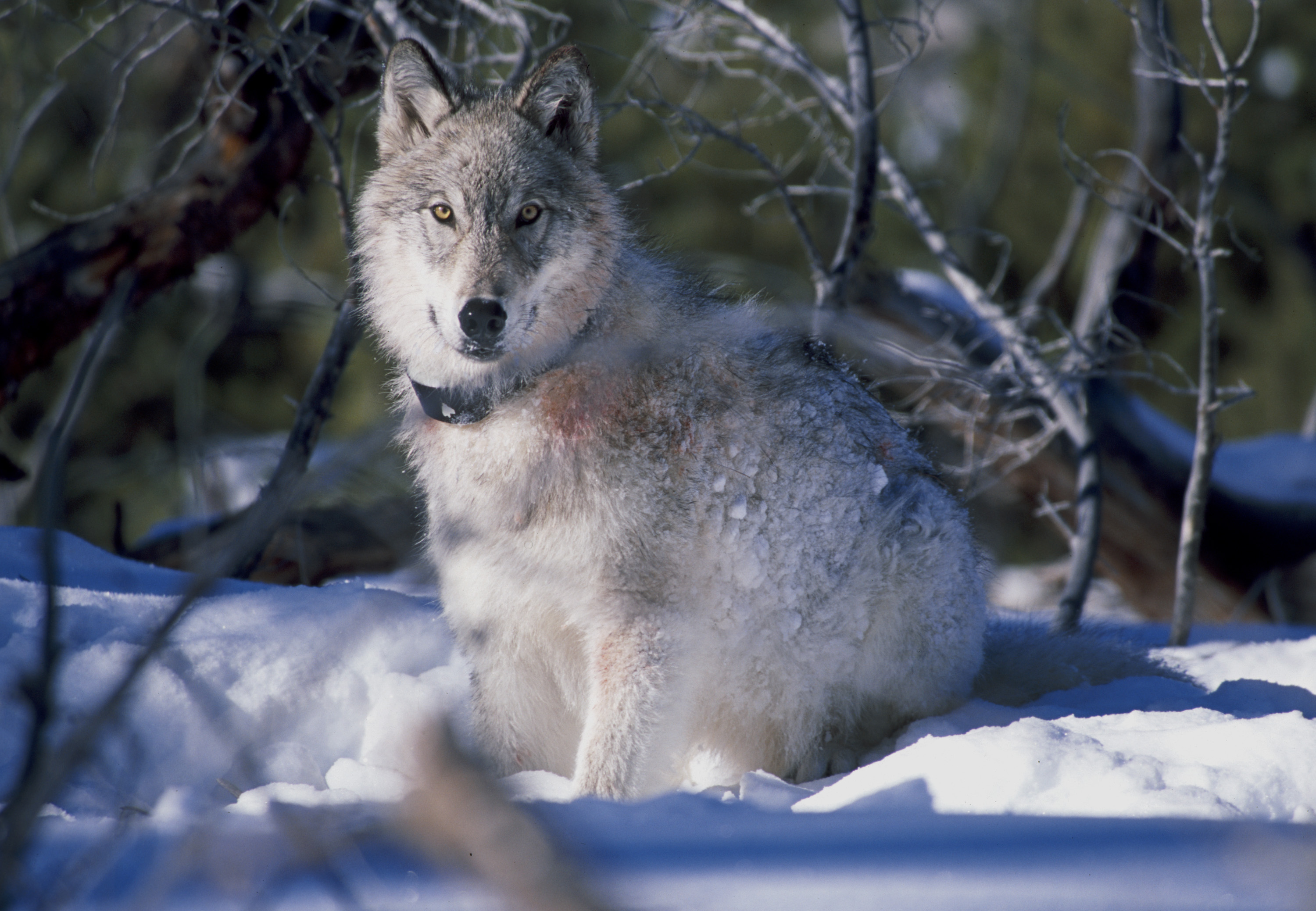
Radio-collared wolf in Yellowstone National Park

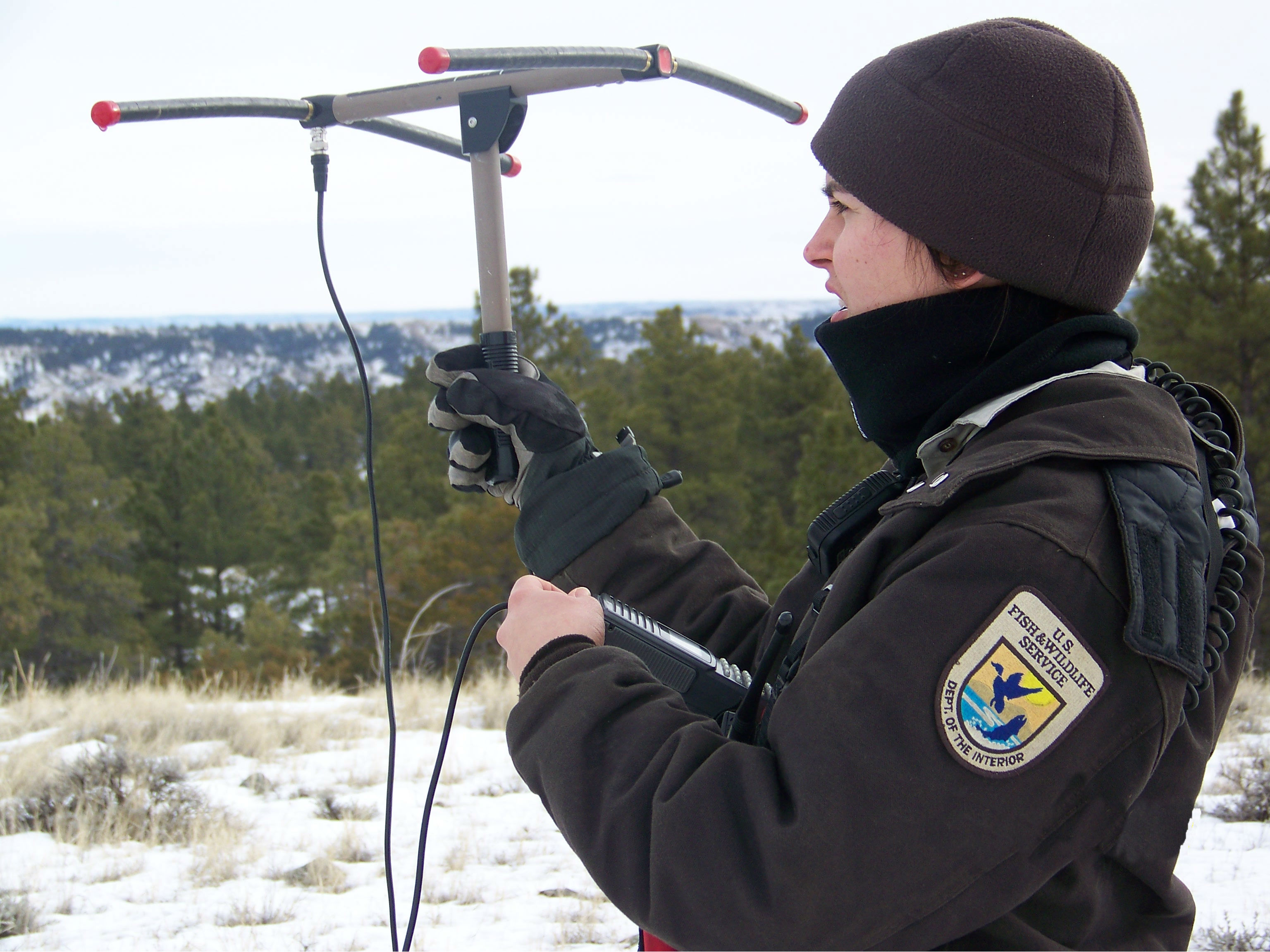
Employee of US Fish and Wildlife Service tracking a mountain lion tagged with a radio collar

Animal migration tracking is used in wildlife biology, conservation biology, ecology, and wildlife management to study animals' behavior in the wild. One of the first techniques was bird banding, placing passive ID tags on birds legs, to identify the bird in a future catch-and-release. Radio tracking involves attaching a small radio transmitter to the animal and following the signal with a RDF receiver. Sophisticated modern techniques use satellites to track tagged animals, and GPS tags which keep a log of the animal's location. With the Emergence of IoT the ability to make devices specific to the species or what is to be tracked is possible. One of the many goals of animal migration research has been to determine where the animals are going; however, researchers also want to know why they are going "there". Researchers not only look at the animals' migration but also what is between the migration endpoints to determine if a species is moving to new locations based on food density, a change in water temperature, or other stimulus, and the animal's ability to adapt to these changes. Migration tracking is a vital tool in efforts to control the impact of human civilization on populations of wild animals, and prevent or mitigate the ongoing extinction of endangered species.

== Technologies ==
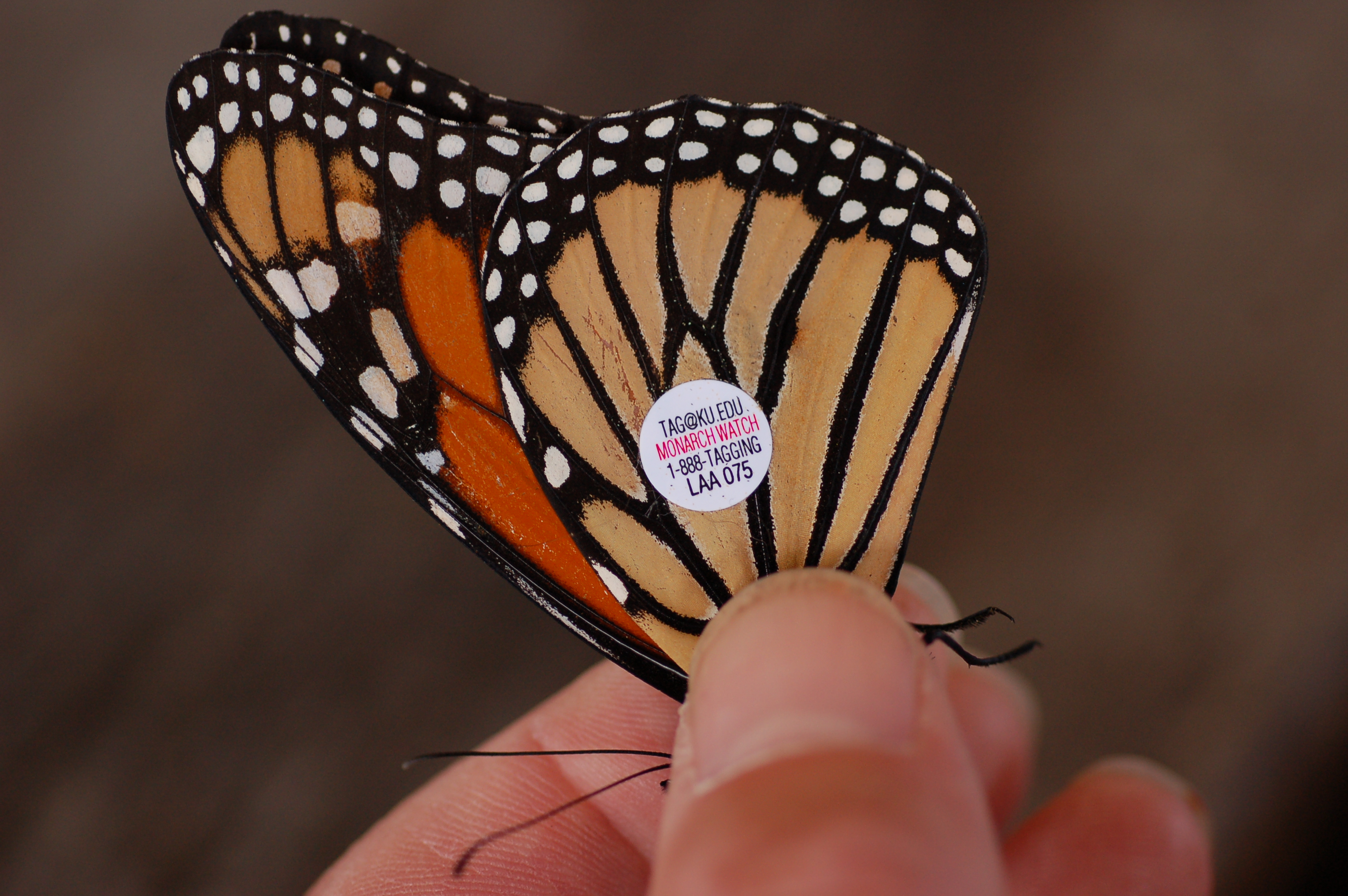
A monarch butterfly shortly after tagging at the Cape May Bird Observatory is one of the organizations that has a monarch identification tagging program. Plastic stickers are placed on the wing of the insect with identification information. Tracking information is used to study the migration patterns of monarchs, including how far and where they fly.

In the fall of 1803, American Naturalist John James Audubon wondered whether migrating birds returned to the same place each year. So he tied a string around the leg of a bird before it flew south. The following spring, Audubon saw the bird had indeed come back.

Scientists today still attach tags, such as metal bands, to track movement of animals. Metal bands require the re-capture of animals for the scientists to gather data; the data is thus limited to the animal's release and destination points.

Recent technologies have helped solve this problem. Some electronic tags give off repeating signals that are picked up by radio devices or satellites while other electronic tags could include archival tags (or data loggers). Scientists can track the locations and movement of the tagged animals without recapturing them using this RFID technology or satellites. These electronic tags can provide a great deal of data. Modern technologies are also smaller, minimising the negative impact of the tag on the animal.

Recent advancements in tracking technology have improved the ability to monitor animal migration without the need for recapturing. Wildlife Drones, an Australian company, developed a drone-based radio telemetry system to track small, mobile species like the Swift Parrot, one of Australia's most endangered birds. Traditional tracking methods for such species involved very high frequency (VHF) radio-tags and manual tracking with handheld receivers, which were labour-intensive and limited in range. The system allows researchers to collect data remotely from multiple tagged animals over large distances, increasing the efficiency and effectiveness of wildlife monitoring.

== Radio tracking ==
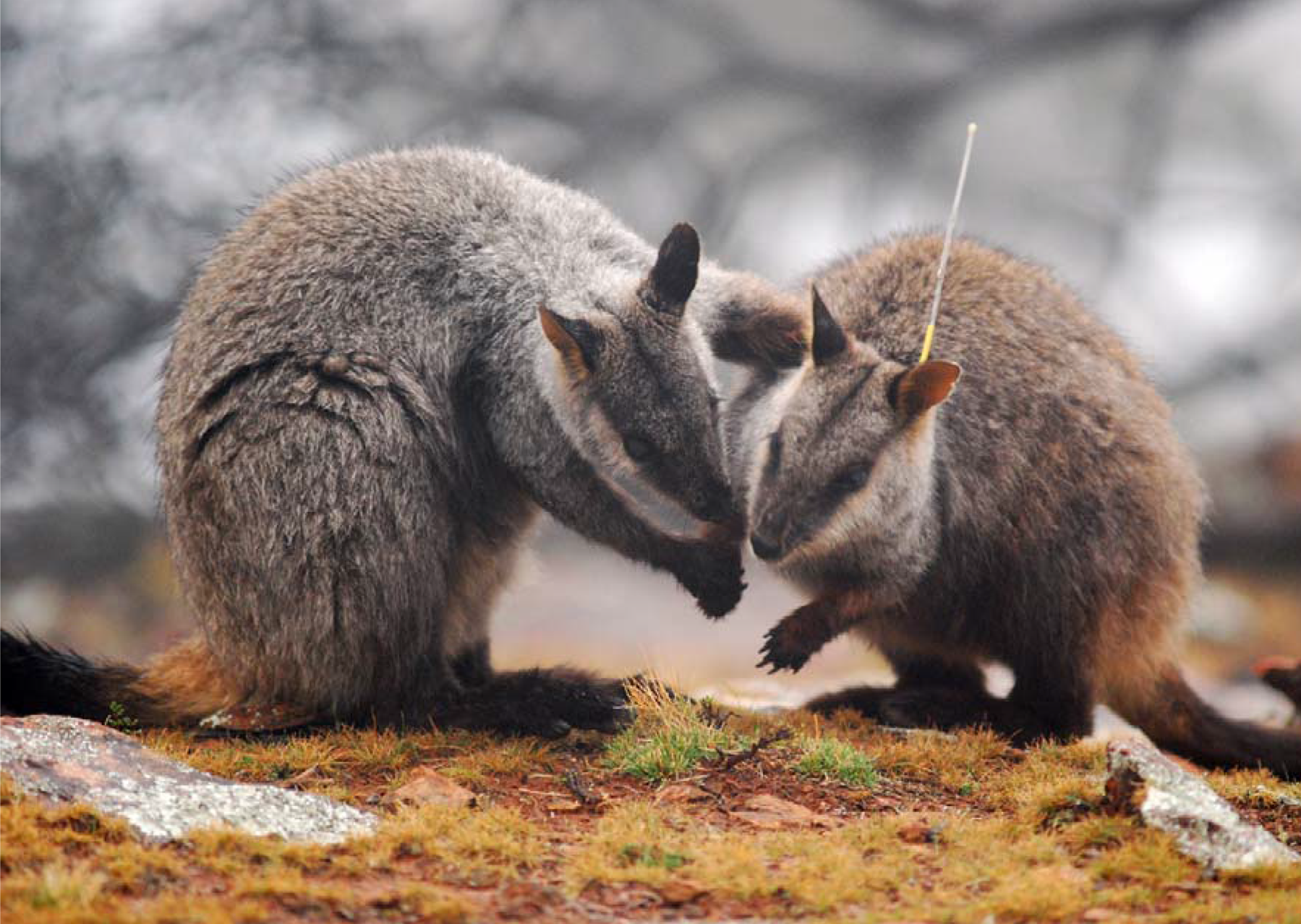
The right one of these two brush-tailed rock-wallabies is wearing a radio tracking collar.

Tracking an animal by radio telemetry involves two devices. Telemetry, in general, involves the use of a transmitter that is attached to an animal and sends out a signal in the form of radio waves, just as a radio station does. A scientist might place the transmitter around an animal's ankle, neck, wing, carapace, or dorsal fin. Alternatively, they may surgically implant it as internal radio transmitters have the advantage of remaining intact and functioning longer than traditional attachments, being protected from environmental variables and wear. The transmitter typically uses a frequency in the VHF band as antennas in this band are conveniently small. To conserve battery power the transmitter usually transmits brief pulses, perhaps one per second. A specialized radio receiver called a radio direction finding (RDF) receiver picks up the signal. The receiver is usually in a truck, an ATV, or an airplane. The receiver has a directional antenna (usually a simple Yagi antenna) which receives most strongly from a single direction, and some means of indicating the strength of the received signal, either by a meter or by the loudness of the pulses in earphones. The antenna is rotated until the received radio signal is strongest; then the antenna is pointing toward the animal. To keep track of the signal, the scientist follows the animal using the receiver. This approach of using radio tracking can be used to track the animal manually but is also used when animals are equipped with other payloads. The receiver is used to home in on the animal to get the payload back.

Another form of radio tracking that can be utilized, especially in the case of small bird migration, is the use of geolocators or "geologgers". This technology utilizes a light sensor that tracks the light-level data during regular intervals in order to determine a location based on the length of the day and the time of solar noon. While there are benefits and challenges with using this method of tracking, it is one of the only practical means of tracking small birds over long distances during migration.

Passive integrated transponders (PIT) are another method of telemetry used to track the movements of a species Passive integrated transponders, or "PIT tags", are electronic tags that allow researchers to collect data from a specimen without the need to recapture and handle the animal. Data is captured and monitored via electronic interrogation antennae, which records the time and location of the individual. Pit tags are a humane method of tracking that has little risk of infection or mortality due to the limited contact necessary to monitor the specimens. They are also cost-efficient in that they can be used repeatedly should the need arise to remove the tag from the animal.

Motus wildlife tracking network is a program by Birds Canada, it was launched in 2014 in the US and Canada, by 2022 there are more than 40,000 transmitters on various animals, mostly birds, and 1,500 receiver stations have been installed in 34 countries, most receivers are concentrated in the United States and Canada.

== Satellite tracking ==
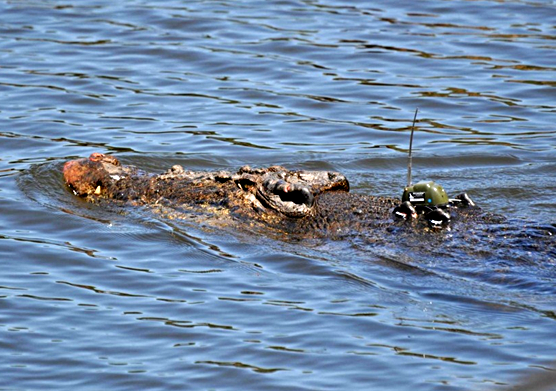
A saltwater crocodile with GPS-based satellite transmitter for migration tracking

Receivers can be placed in Earth-orbiting satellites such as ARGOS. Networks, or groups, of satellites are used to track animals. Each satellite in a network picks up electronic signals from a transmitter on an animal. Together, the signals from all satellites determine the precise location of the animal. The satellites also track the animal's path as it moves. Satellite tracking is especially useful because the scientists do not have to follow after the animal nor do they have to recover the tag to get the data on where the animal is going or has gone. Satellite networks have tracked the migration and territorial movements of caribou, sea turtles, whales, great white sharks, seals, elephants, bald eagles, ospreys and vultures. Additionally Pop-up satellite archival tags are used on marine mammals and various species of fish. There are two main systems, the above-mentioned Argos and the GPS. Thanks to these systems, conservationists can find the key sites for migratory species. Another form of satellite tracking would be the use of acoustic telemetry. This involves the use of electronic tags that emit sound in order for the researchers to track and monitor an animal within three dimensions, which is helpful in instances when large quantities of a species are being tracked at a time.

== IoT tracking ==
IoT or the internet of things proves to be a potential resource for the future of wildlife tracking and research. This technology can range from low-power wide-area LPWA sensor networks attached to wildlife by safe adhesive to cameras connected to the internet using machine learning to determine what images are interesting and categorize the photos. With LPWA, the applications are endless. All that needs to be done is to develop the sensors that attach to any animal. With the sensors' low power, changing their batteries becomes less of a problem. The program Where's The Bear is a wildlife monitoring software by the Computer Science Department at the University of California Santa Barba. They use cameras as their sensors and machine learning to quantify the photos into empty pictures triggered by wind and rain. They are instead reporting those of different species of animals. To make the training process of the algorithm rapid, they used edited photos with animals inserted in the shot of the given sensors view to sense the different animals. This training was able to make the technology more accurate with fewer false positives and false negatives. This method increased the ability to categorize animals' photos, proving a potential new technology for vast groups of people for commercial and public use.

== Stable isotopes ==
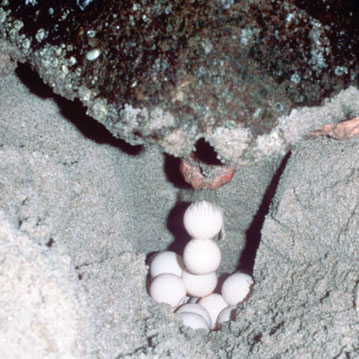
Sea turtle eggs being laid by the mother. Unhatched eggs can be used in stable isotope analysis.

Stable isotopes are one of the intrinsic markers used for studying migration of animals. One of the benefits of intrinsic markers in general, including stable isotope analysis, is that it does not require an organism to be captured and tagged and then recaptured at a later time. Each capture of an organism provides information on where it has been based on diet. The three types of intrinsic markers that can be used as tools for animal migration studies are: (1) contaminants, parasites and pathogens, (2) trace elements, and (3) stable isotopes. Certain geographic regions have specific stable isotope ratios that affect the chemistry of organisms foraging in those locations, this creates "isoscapes" that scientists can use to understand where the organism has been eating. A couple prerequisites must be met in order to use stable isotope analysis successfully: (1) the animal must have at least one light isotope of interest in specific tissues that can be sampled (this condition is almost always met since these light isotopes are building blocks of most animal tissues), and (2) the organism needs to migrate between isotopically different regions and these isotopes must be retained in the tissue in order for the differences to be measured.

Stable isotope analysis has a lot of benefits and has been used in terrestrial and aquatic organisms. For example, stable isotope analysis has been confirmed to work in determining foraging locations of nesting loggerhead sea turtles. Satellite telemetry was used to confirm that the location derived from the analysis were accurate to where these turtles actually traveled. This is important because it allows for greater sample sizes to be used in migration studies, since satellite telemetry is expensive and tissue, blood, and egg samples can be taken from the female turtles laying eggs.

== Importance ==
Electronic tags are giving scientists a complete, accurate picture of migration patterns. For example, when scientists used radio transmitters to track one herd of caribou, they learned two important things. First, they learned that the herd moves much more than previously thought. Second, they learned that each year the herd returns to about the same place to give birth. This information would have been difficult or impossible to obtain with "low tech" tags.

Tracking migrations is an important tool to better understand and protect species. For example, Florida manatees are an endangered species, and therefore they need protection. Radio tracking showed that Florida manatees may travel as far as Rhode Island when they migrate. This information suggests that the manatees may need protection along much of the Atlantic Coast of the United States. Previously, protection efforts focused mainly in the Florida area.

In the wake of the BP oil spill, efforts in tracking animals has increased in the Gulf. Most researchers who use electronic tags have only a few options: pop-up satellite tags, archival tags, or satellite tags. Historically these tags were generally expensive and could cost several thousands of dollars per tag. However, with current advancements in technology prices are now allowing researchers to tag more animals. With this increase in the number of species and individuals that can be tagged it is important to record and acknowledge the potential negative effects these devices might have.

== See also ==
- Acoustic tag
- Bird ringing
- Data storage tag
- History of wildlife tracking technology
- Light level geolocator
- GIS and aquatic science
- Pop-up satellite archival tag
- Tracking collar
- Coded wire tag
- Motus (wildlife tracking network)
