= Geolocator =

Geolocator may refer to:

- Light level geolocator, a lightweight electronic archival tracking device, usually used in bird migration
- Geolocation, the identification of the real-world geographic location of an object
- Geolocation software, software used to deduce the geographic location of another party
- GPS navigation device, a device typically used in cars for navigation
- - Tools for Wikipedians
- Geolocator, a role where the geographical location of a photo, video or data is confirmed and verified using other sources.
