= Montague Island (Alaska) =

Island in Chugach Census Area, Alaska, United States

Coordinates: 60°06′33″N 147°20′28″W

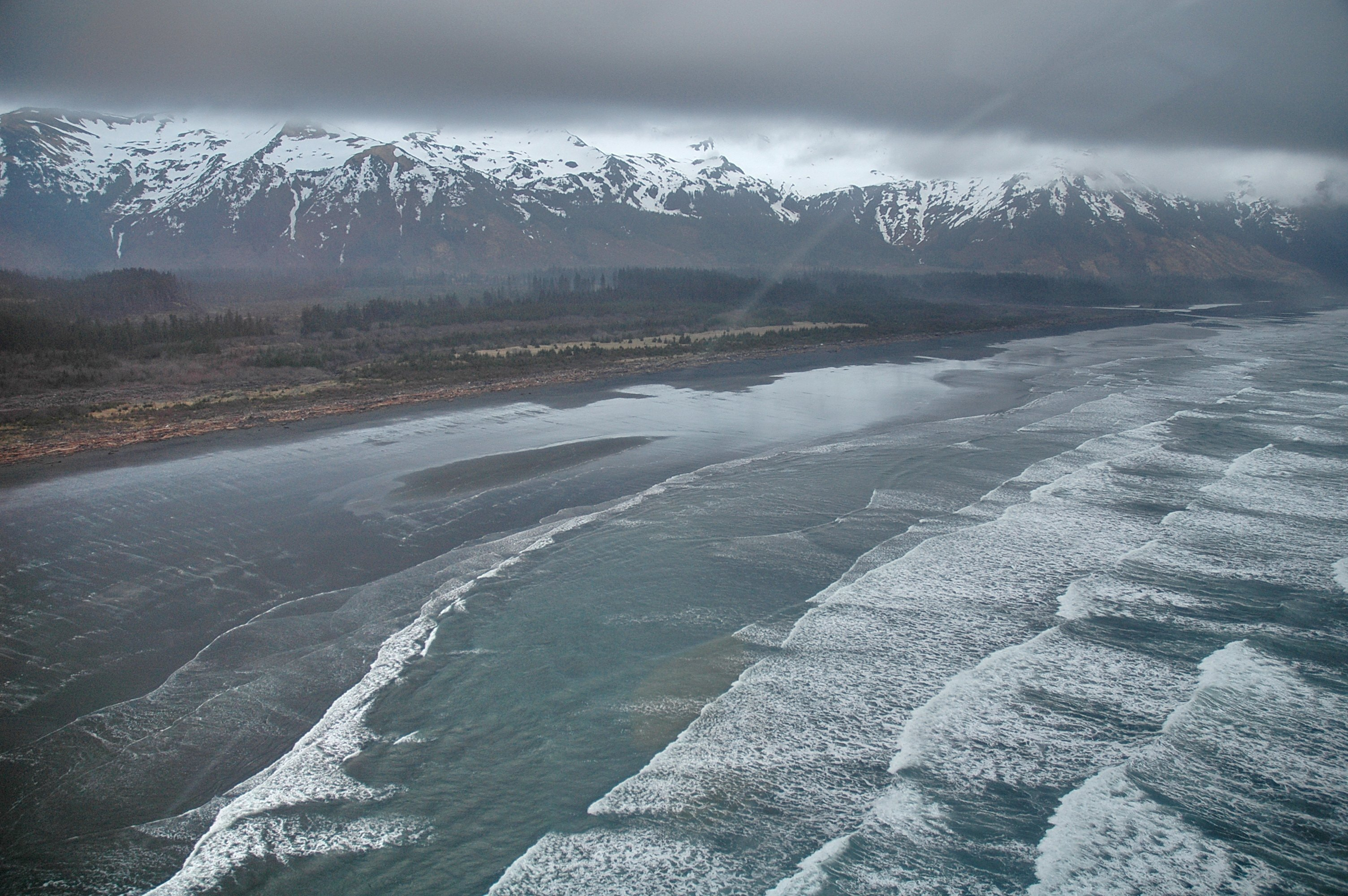
Montague Island at low tide in 2010

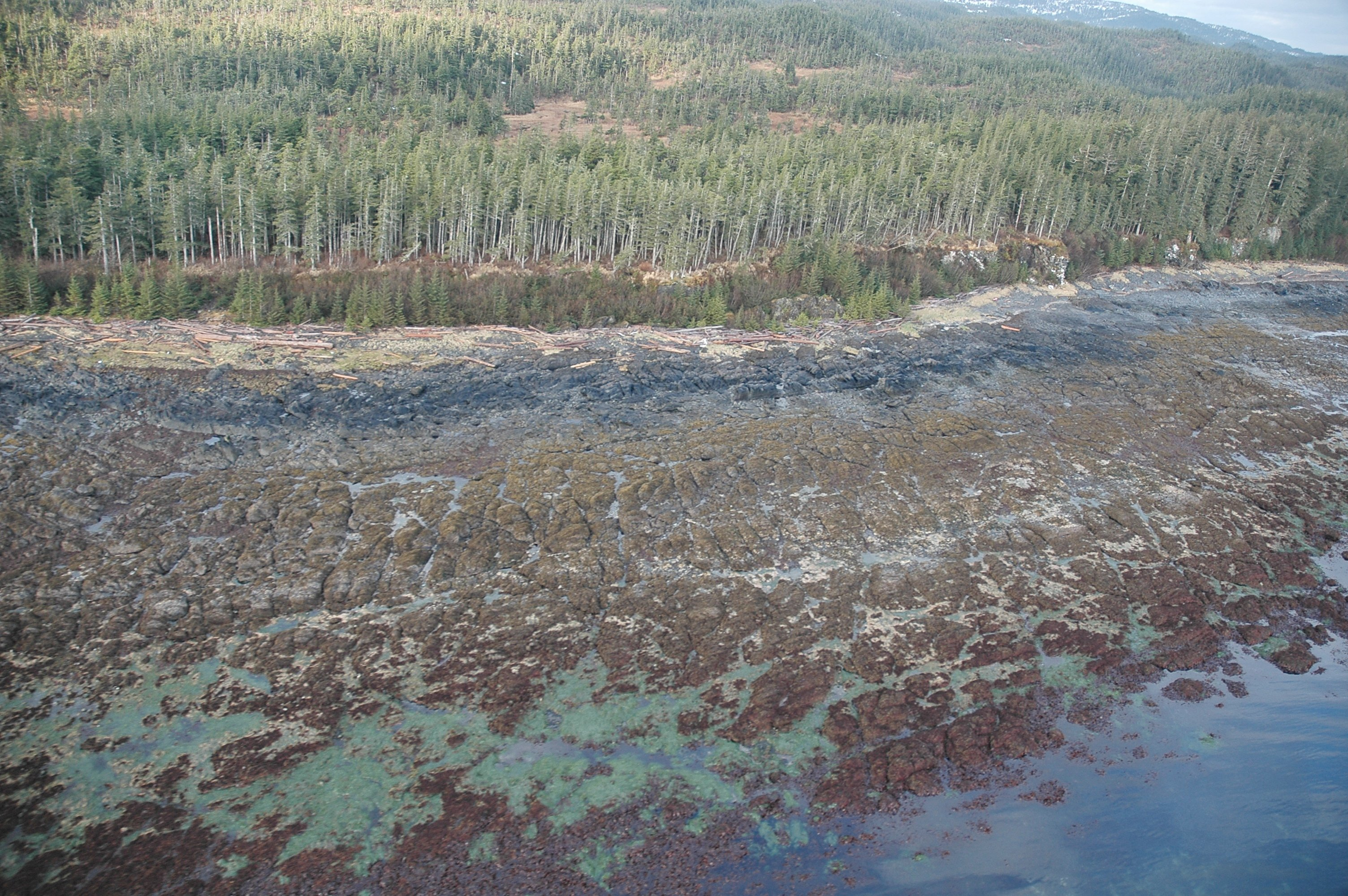
An aerial photograph taken on November 16, 2010, showing erosion patterns in joint patterns of rocks on the shore of Montague Island, with large tide pools showing at the lower limit of low tide.

Montague Island (Sugpiaq: Suklluurniilnguq) lies in the Gulf of Alaska at the entrance to Prince William Sound, Alaska. The island has a land area of 790.88 km^{2} (305.36 sq mi), making it the 25th largest island in the United States. As of the 2000 census, Montague did not have a permanent resident population, making it at that time the largest uninhabited island in the United States. Since then, the 2010 abandonment of the United States Coast Guard station on Attu Island in the Aleutian Islands, which at 892.8 km^{2} (344.7 sq mi) is larger than Montague Island, causes Attu to claim that title. Montague Island was named by Captain James Cook in honor of John Montagu, 4th Earl of Sandwich, one of his greatest supporters.

Montague Island is well known in Seward, Alaska, for its sports fishery, and it is referred to as "The Land of the Giants." In 2007, the waters around the island produced a 350-pound (156-kg) halibut and many boats full of fish weighing over 100 pounds (45 kg) each.

The island's coastal ecology has been subjected to "unprecedented amounts of ocean trash" transported by wind and currents from Japan's March 2011 tsunami, according to the Center for Alaskan Coastal Studies in May 2012. A large-scale clean-up began on 22 May 2012, funded by The Marine Conservation Alliance Foundation.

== Popular culture ==
- Charles Alexander Sheldon's chapters "Montague Island" and "Hunting the Big Bear" in The Wilderness of the North West Pacific Coast Islands
- W. Douglas Burden's chapter "This was Adventure" in his Look to the Wilderness.
