= GIS and aquatic science =

Implementation of Geographic Information System

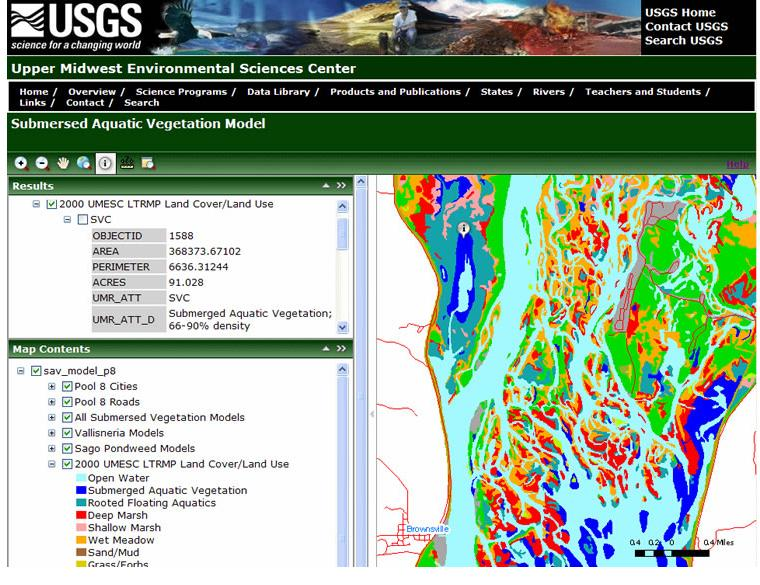
ArcGIS Server website depicting submersed aquatic vegetation

Geographic Information Systems (GIS) has become an integral part of aquatic science and limnology. Water by its very nature is dynamic. Features associated with water are thus ever-changing. To be able to keep up with these changes, technological advancements have given scientists methods to enhance all aspects of scientific investigation, from satellite tracking of wildlife to computer mapping of habitats. Agencies like the US Geological Survey, US Fish and Wildlife Service as well as other federal and state agencies are utilizing GIS to aid in their conservation efforts.

GIS is being used in multiple fields of aquatic science from limnology, hydrology, aquatic botany, stream ecology, oceanography and marine biology. Applications include using satellite imagery to identify, monitor and mitigate habitat loss. Imagery can also show the condition of inaccessible areas. Scientists can track movements and develop a strategy to locate locations of concern. GIS can be used to track invasive species, endangered species, and population changes.

One of the advantages of the system is the availability for the information to be shared and updated at any time through the use of web-based data collection.

== GIS and fish ==
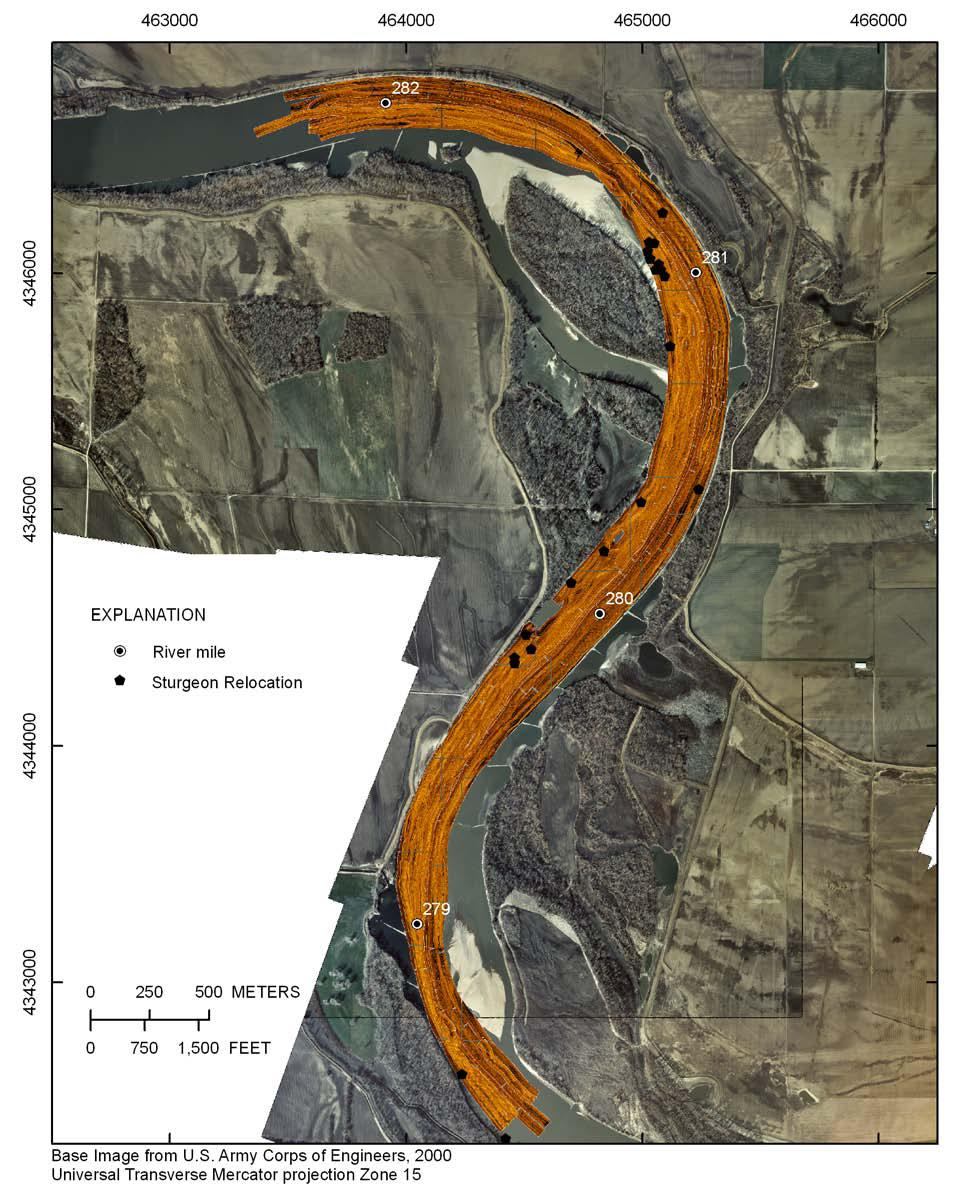
USGS sidescan radar image over base image from Army Corps of Engineers, indicating sturgeon location and river mile

In the past, GIS was not a practical source of analysis due to the difficulty in obtaining spatial data on habitats or organisms in underwater environments. With the advancement of radio telemetry, hydroacoustic telemetry and side-scan sonar biologists have been able to track fish species and create databases that can be incorporated into a GIS program to create a geographical representation. Using radio and hydroacoustic telemetry, biologists are able to locate fish and acquire relatable data for those sites, this data may include substrate samples, temperature, and conductivity. Side-scan sonar allows biologists to map out a river bottom to gain a representation of possible habitats that are used. These two sets of data can be overlaid to delineate the distribution of fish and their habitats for fish. This method has been used in the study of the pallid sturgeon.

Over a period of time large amounts of data are collected and can be used to track patterns of migration, spawning locations and preferred habitat. Before, this data would be mapped and overlaid manually. Now this data can be entered into a GIS program and be layered, organized and analyzed in a way that was not possible to do in the past. Layering within a GIS program allows for the scientist to look at multiple species at once to find possible watersheds that are shared by these species, or to specifically choose one species for further examination. The US Geological Survey (USGS) in, cooperation with other agencies, were able to use GIS in helping map out habitat areas and movement patterns of pallid sturgeon. At the Columbia Environmental Research Center their effort relies on a customized ArcPad and ArcGIS, both ESRI (Environmental Systems Research Institute) applications, to record sturgeon movements to streamline data collection. A relational database was developed to manage tabular data for each individual sturgeon, including initial capture and reproductive physiology. Movement maps can be created for individual sturgeon. These maps help track the movements of each sturgeon through space and time. This allowed these researchers to prioritize and schedule field personnel efforts to track, map, and recapture sturgeon.

== GIS and macrophytes ==
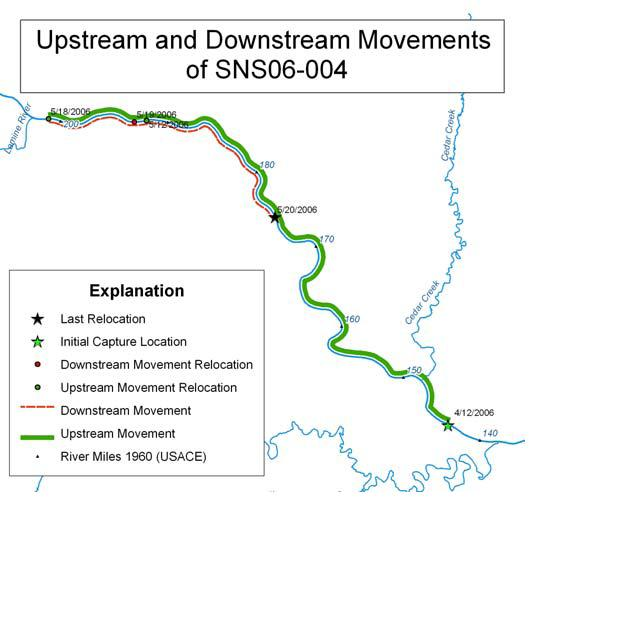
Map created from GIS database depicting the movements of individual sturgeon

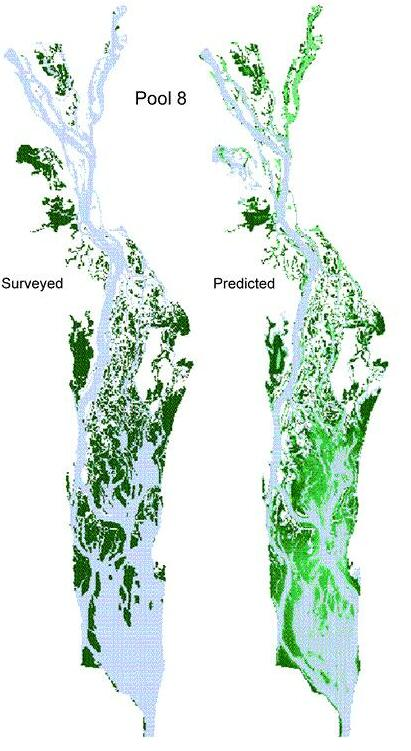
Surveyed (left) and predicted (right) distributions of submersed aquatic vegetation distribution Upper Mississippi River in 1989. The survey data were from the land cover/land use geographic information created by the U.S. Geological Survey Upper Midwest Environmental Sciences Center on the basis of interpretation of aerial photography of 1989.

Macrophytes are an important part of healthy ecosystems. They provide habitat, refuge, and food for fish, wildlife, and other organisms. Though natural occurring species are of great interest so are the invasive species that occur alongside these in our environment. GIS is being used by agencies and their respective resource managers as a tool to model these important macrophyte species. Through the use of GIS resource managers can assess the distributions of this important aspect of aquatic environments through a spatial and temporal scale. The ability to track vegetation change through time and space to make predictions about vegetation change are some of the many possibilities of GIS. Accurate maps of the aquatic plant distribution within an aquatic ecosystem are an essential part resource management.

It is possible to predict the possible occurrences of aquatic vegetation. For example, the USGS has created a model for the American wild celery (Vallisneria americana) by developing a statistical model that calculates the probability of submersed aquatic vegetation. They established a web link to an Environmental Systems Research Institute (ESRI) ArcGIS Server website *Submersed Aquatic Vegetation Model to make their model predictions available online. These predictions for distribution of submerged aquatic vegetation can potentially have an effect on foraging birds by creating avoidance zones by humans. If it is known where these areas are, birds can be left alone to feed undisturbed. When there are years where the aquatic vegetation is predicted to be limited in these important wildlife habitats, managers can be alerted.

Invasive species have become a great conservation concern for resource managers. GIS allows managers to map out plant locations and abundances. These maps can then be used to determine the threat of these invasive plants and help the managers decide on management strategies. Surveys of these species can be conducted and then downloaded into a GIS system. Coupled with this, native species can be included to determine how these communities respond with each other. By using known data of preexisting invasive species GIS models could predict future outbreaks by comparing biological factors. The Connecticut Agricultural Experiment Station Invasive Aquatic Species Program (CAES IAPP) is using GIS to evaluate risk factors. GIS allows managers to georeference plant locations and abundance. This allows for managers to display invasive communities alongside native species for study and management.

== See also ==
- Acoustic tag
- Animal migration tracking
- Data storage tag
- Pop-up satellite archival tag
