= Acoustic tag =

Device that enables detection and tracking of animals

Acoustic tags, also known as acoustic transmitters, are small sound-emitting devices that allow the detection and/or remote tracking of organisms in aquatic ecosystems such as lakes, rivers, tributaries, estuaries, or sea. Acoustic tags are commonly used to monitor behavior and movements of fish by sending information to data-logging computers known as acoustic receivers. Acoustic tags allow researchers to obtain locational data of tagged fish through acoustic telemetry. Depending on tag and receiver array configurations, researchers can receive simple presence/absence data, 2D positional data, or even 3D fish tracks in real-time with sub-meter resolutions.

Acoustic tags have been used to:

- Conduct survival studies and estimate mortality
- Monitor migration, passage, bypass effectiveness, and trajectory
- Describe predator and prey dynamics
- Surveil movement and activity
- Estimate site fidelity
- Quantify habitat preferences

== Sampling ==
Acoustic tags transmit a signal made up of acoustic pulses or "pings" that send positional information of the tagged organism to a hydrophone receiver. By tying the received acoustic frequency to a predetermined and unique signal code, tagged animals can be identified at an individual level. Transmitted signals may propagate up to 1 km (in freshwater) depending on tag model and environmental conditions. Receivers can be actively held by a researcher ("Active Tracking") or affixed to specific locations ("Passive Tracking"). Arrays of receivers can allow the triangulation of tagged individuals over many kilometers.

=== Tags ===
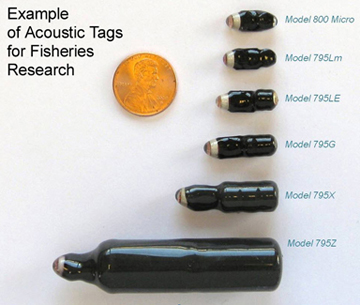
Examples of different acoustic tag sizes

Acoustic tags are produced in many different shapes and sizes depending on the study organism or study environment. The battery life of acoustic tags varies by size, with some larger tags lasting over four years. Sound parameters such as frequency and modulation method are chosen for optimal detectability and signal level. For oceanic environments, frequencies less than 100 kHz range are often used, while frequencies of several hundreds of kilohertz are more common in for studies in rivers and lakes.

A typical acoustic tag consists of a piezoceramic transducer, drive/timing electronics, and a battery power source. Cylindrical or “tube” transducers are often used, which have metalization on the inner and outer walls of the structure. In normal operation, an alternating current (AC) electrical signal generated by the drive/timing electronics is impressed across the two metalization layers. This voltage creates stress in the material, which in turn cause the transducer to emit an acoustic signal or “ping”, which emanates outward from the surface of the tube. An acoustic “ping” can be detected by specialized receivers, and processed using advanced signal processing techniques to determine if a fish swimming into the reception area carries a specific acoustic tag.

Acoustic tags are distinguished from other types of devices such as radio tags or passive inductive transponder (PIT) tags in that they can work in either salt or freshwater (e.g., radio and PIT tags perform poorly in saltwater) and do not depend on steering the fish in a particular path (e.g., PIT tags require the fish to be routed through a restricted sensing area).

Several different methods are used to attach the tag to an organism. In fish, tags are frequently surgically implanted in the abdominal cavity. Surgical implantation generally results in high tag retention, therefore it is regularly used. Electro-immobilization with a TENS unit and chemical immobilization with compounds such as eugenol are commonly used to restrict fish movement during surgery. In some instances, tags are endogastrically implanted by forcing the tag down the gullet. Acoustic tags may also be attached externally using additional braces or tag types.

=== Receivers ===
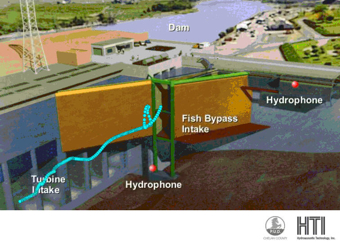
Illustration of juvenile salmonid travelling through a fish by-pass intake.

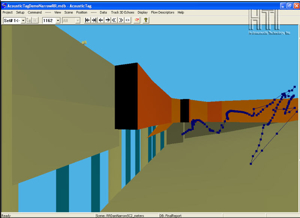
Acoustic tag tracking software screen of fish travelling toward a fish bypass intake (side view).

By determining the sound's time of arrival at each hydrophone, the 3D position of the fish can be calculated. The hydrophone receiver picks up the sound signal and converts it to data that researchers use to plot the resulting tag positions in three dimensions, in real-time. Using a post processing software, such as MarkTags, takes that data and delivers the result, the 3D track.

== Applications ==
=== Freshwater ===
==== Rivers ====
At present, acoustic tags are most commonly used to monitor fish approaching diversion and guidance structures at hydropower dams. This allows hydropowered dam facilities, public utility districts, and municipalities to evaluate specific migration pathways used by the fish (most often salmon smolts), identify where fish mortality occurs, and assess fish behavior in relation to hydrodynamic conditions and/or any other environmental parameters. Ultimately, working to improve bypass effectiveness and protect fish populations, Acoustic Tag Tracking Systems are a significant breakthrough in the preservation of migrating salmon populations.

Acoustic tags have been employed to help public utility agencies, private firms, and state and federal agencies meet fisheries regulations as defined by the Federal Regulations and Oversight of Energy (FERC).

==== Lakes ====
In the Laurentian Great Lakes, acoustic telemetry has addressed a variety of fishery research and management concerns through research conducted through the Great Lakes Acoustic Telemetry Observation System (GLATOS). Estimates of spawning site fidelity have been made for lake trout and walleye.

Acoustic telemetry has also been used to inform invasive species management through the use of Judas fish, or tagged fish used to "betray" the location or behaviors of others. Acoustic tags were used on sea lamprey in the Great Lakes to determine the effectiveness of traps at physical removal and to locate potential spawning locations. They have also been used on common carp throughout North America to identify seasonal aggregations for future exploitation and removal.

== Limitations ==
Although incredibly valuable as a research and management tool, acoustic tags have some limitations. Foremost, the equipment required for acoustic telemetry (e.g., tags, receivers, replacement batteries for receivers, mounting and deployment materials for receivers) can be cost-prohibitive especially in comparison to other techniques such as radio telemetry. For example, acoustic receivers can cost more than US$2,000 per unit while tags can range from $200 - US$1,000 per unit, depending on model. Additionally, acoustic tags have variable detection range depending on habitat type, tag size, and environmental conditions. Variability in detection or poor detection probability could ultimately influence conclusions made from data and therefore is important to account for by range testing. Considerations on project scale and timeframe are necessary before implementing acoustic telemetry.

== See also ==
- Animal migration tracking
- Data storage tag
- GIS and aquatic science
- Pop-up satellite archival tag
