= Pop-up satellite archival tag =

Form of electronic tracking of marine animals

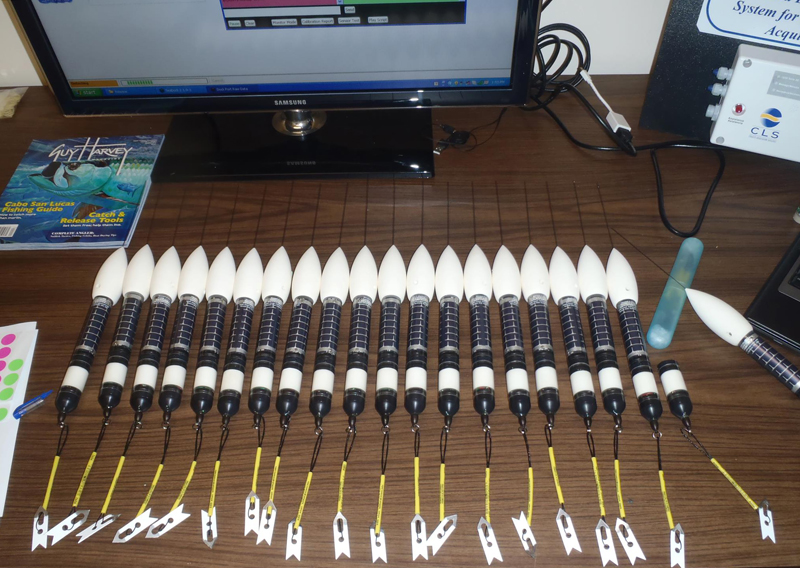
SeaTag-MOD Pop-Up Satellite Tags ready for deployment

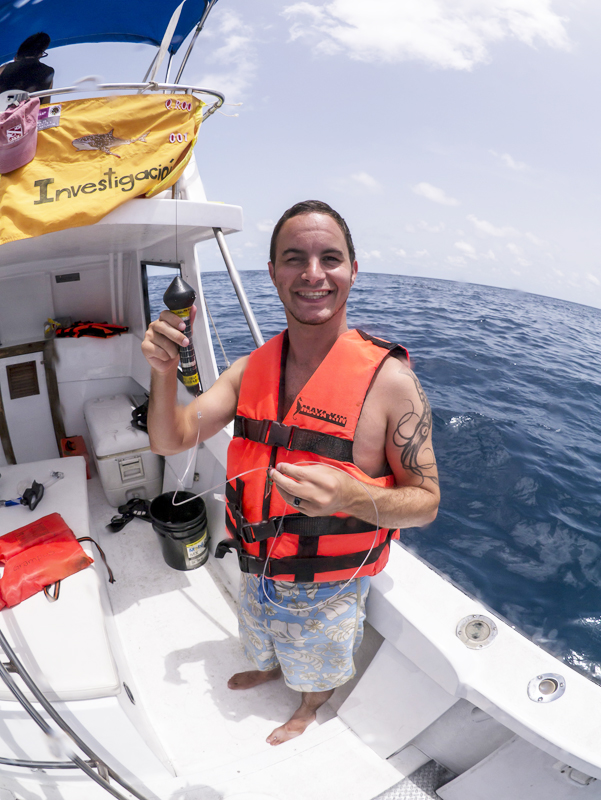
Thomas Gray, CLS America, is holding a SeaTag-MOD pop-up satellite tag which is ready for deployment on a whale shark (Isla Mujeres, MX).

Pop-up satellite archival tags (PSATs) are used to track movements of (usually large, migratory) marine animals. A PSAT (also commonly referred to as a PAT tag) is an archival tag (or data logger) that is equipped with a means to transmit the collected data via the Argos satellite system. Though the data are physically stored on the tag, its major advantage is that it does not have to be physically retrieved like an archival tag for the data to be available making it a viable, fishery independent tool for animal behavior and migration studies. They have been used to track movements of ocean sunfish, marlin, blue sharks, bluefin tuna, swordfish and sea turtles to name a few species. Location, depth, temperature, oxygen levels, and body movement data are used to answer questions about migratory patterns, seasonal feeding movements, daily habits, and survival after catch and release, for example.

A satellite tag is generally constructed of several components: a data-logging section, a release section, a float, and an antenna. The release sections include an energetically popped off release section or a corrosive pin that is actively corroded on a preset date or after a specified period of time. Some limitations of using satellite tags are their depth limitations (2000m), their costs ($499–$4000+), their vulnerability to loss by environmental issues (biofouling), or premature release through ingestion by a predator.

There are two methods of underwater geolocation that PSATs employ. The first method is through light based geolocation which uses the length of the day and a noon time calculation to estimate the tags location while underwater. This method has a functional depth limitation of light penetration which can be as shallow as a few meters to upwards of hundreds of meters. Geolocation estimates based on light are usually coupled with additional satellite data like sea surface temperature or other available data input such as bathymetry, land avoidance, and physical limitations of the tagged animal. The other method available is through measuring ambient light and the Earth's magnetic field. This method has a functional depth limitation equivalent of the maximum depth limitation, generally 1800m. Magnetic based geolocation is generally not coupled with additional satellite data or other inputs, and relies on the Earth's magnetic field for latitude estimations and light (noon time) for longitude estimations.

== General information ==
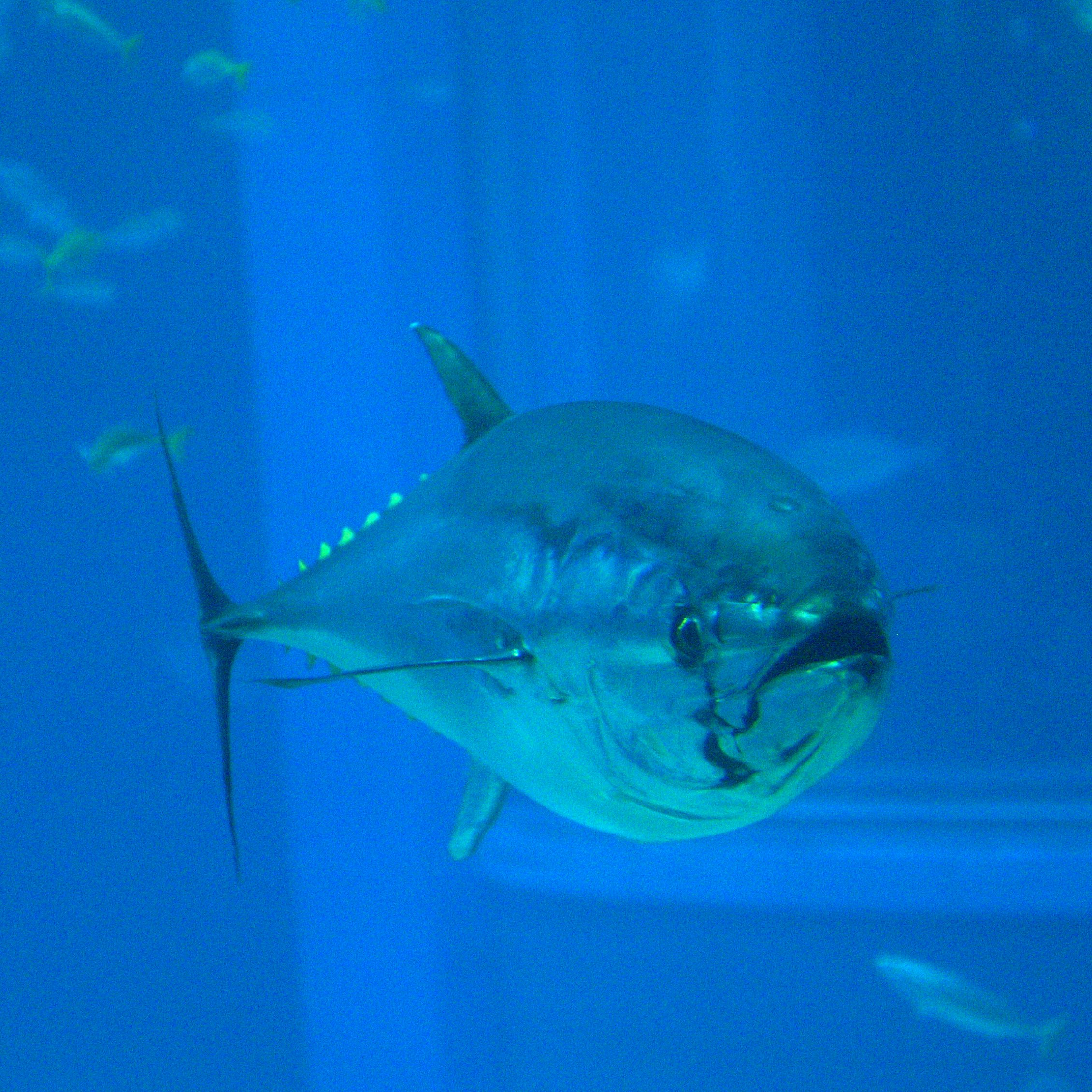
PSATs are usually used on large marine animals and have been used in several studies of the bluefin tuna.

Deployment of a PSAT on a bluefin tuna.

Pop-up satellite tags range in length from about 125–215 mm (4.9–8.5 in) and weigh 36-108 grams in air. A tag must be small compared to the size of the animal, anywhere from 3-5% of the total fish weight, so that it does not interfere with normal behavior.

These tags record information such as temperature, magnetics, acceleration, light level, oxygen levels and pressure at set intervals of a few seconds to several hours. Data are often collected for several weeks or months, but with new advances in memory technology microSD cards tags can store data for centuries. PSATs record data in non-volatile memory so that data are retained even if the power source fails.

When the PSAT releases from the animal on which it was attached, it floats to the surface, and begins to transmit data to the Argos satellites at a frequency of 401.65 MHz +/-. Therefore, the tag does not have to be physically recovered for the data to be obtained. Summarized data illustrating where the fish's migration started and ended is usually recovered from the tag within about seven days; however, tags can transmit significant amounts of oceanic data for months after they release from the fish.

Limitations of PSAT technology are that it is subject to loss by malfunction of the power source, environmental effects such as biofouling, ingestion by a predator, its depth limitation and cost. Most PSATs have internal software designed to detect damaging or sub-optimal conditions that will trigger an early release and transmission of data. For example, PSATs can withstand pressures to depths of 2,000 to 2,500 metres (6,600 to 8,200 ft) depending on the model. If data indicate no change in pressure (depth) for a period of time, this could trigger an early release due to premature release (a tag pulling out of the fish early) or death of the animal to which it was attached. Such internal checks can alert researchers to unexpected or undesirable events. Ingestion by a predator is more difficult to detect in the sense of forcing a tag to report; however, in data processing it is indicated by an immediate loss of light and an increase in temperature that stabilizes while it is inside the predator.

== Types ==
=== Using light level ===
The most popular method of determining an animal's location underwater requires the tag to acquire light levels throughout the day. Observing the length of the day, from when the tag observed the first light until the last light, the tag can determine its latitudinal location (with accuracy exceeding 1 degree). From the length of day the tag computes the noon time which is converted to a longitude location (with accuracy averaging about 0.5 degree or 30–50 nautical miles). This method of geolocation is suitable for animals that inhabit clear waters near the surface. At depths or in turbid waters, light based geolocation does not work as well due to light attenuation. It also does not work well during the equinoxes when the length of day is globally uniform. Manufacturers of this technology include Wildlife Computers, Microwave Telemetry, and Lotek Wireless. Star-Oddi is in the development phase of a pop-up satellite tag as well.

=== Using Earth’s magnetic field and light level ===
Another approach to geolocation couples light and magnetics. This method measures the total Earth's magnetic field for latitude estimations while using light based noon time detection for longitude. These tags measure the Earth's magnetic field on their built-in magnetometers throughout the day and then take the average value as the tag's daily location. Average accuracy of this method is approximately 35 nautical miles. Manufacturers of this technology include Desert Star Systems.

== See also ==
- Acoustic tag
- Argos system
- Animal migration tracking
- Data storage tag
- GIS and aquatic science
