= Northwest Atlantic Marine Alliance =

American non-profit organization

Northwest Atlantic Marine Alliance (NAMA) is a non-profit organization that aims to restore and enhance an enduring marine system supporting a healthy diversity and an abundance of marine life and human uses through a self-organizing and self-governing organization.

== History ==
NAMA was founded in 1995, in New England, United States. A small group of fishermen and fishing community advocates began exploring an alternative management structure, using the decentralized governance model successfully employed by BankAmericard in the 1960s when rebranding as Visa Inc. under the leadership of Dee Hock, VISA's founder and CEO Emeritus.

In 1998, NAMA incorporated as an independent, non-profit organization focused on pursuing community based management to achieve its aims.

Led by Captain Craig Pendleton, Peter Schelley and Jennifer Atkinson of Conservation Law Foundation, Mark Simonitch (commercial fisherman), Rollie Barnaby of University of New Hampshire and other advisors and participants, NAMA set out to perform collaborative research aimed at realizing community and ecosystem-based management.

NAMA advocates for a collaborative process aimed at managing resources on a localized level, and not the entire U.S. eastern seaboard.

== See also ==
- Community supported fishery
