= Minimum landing size =

Smallest fish measurement at which it is legal to keep or sell a fish

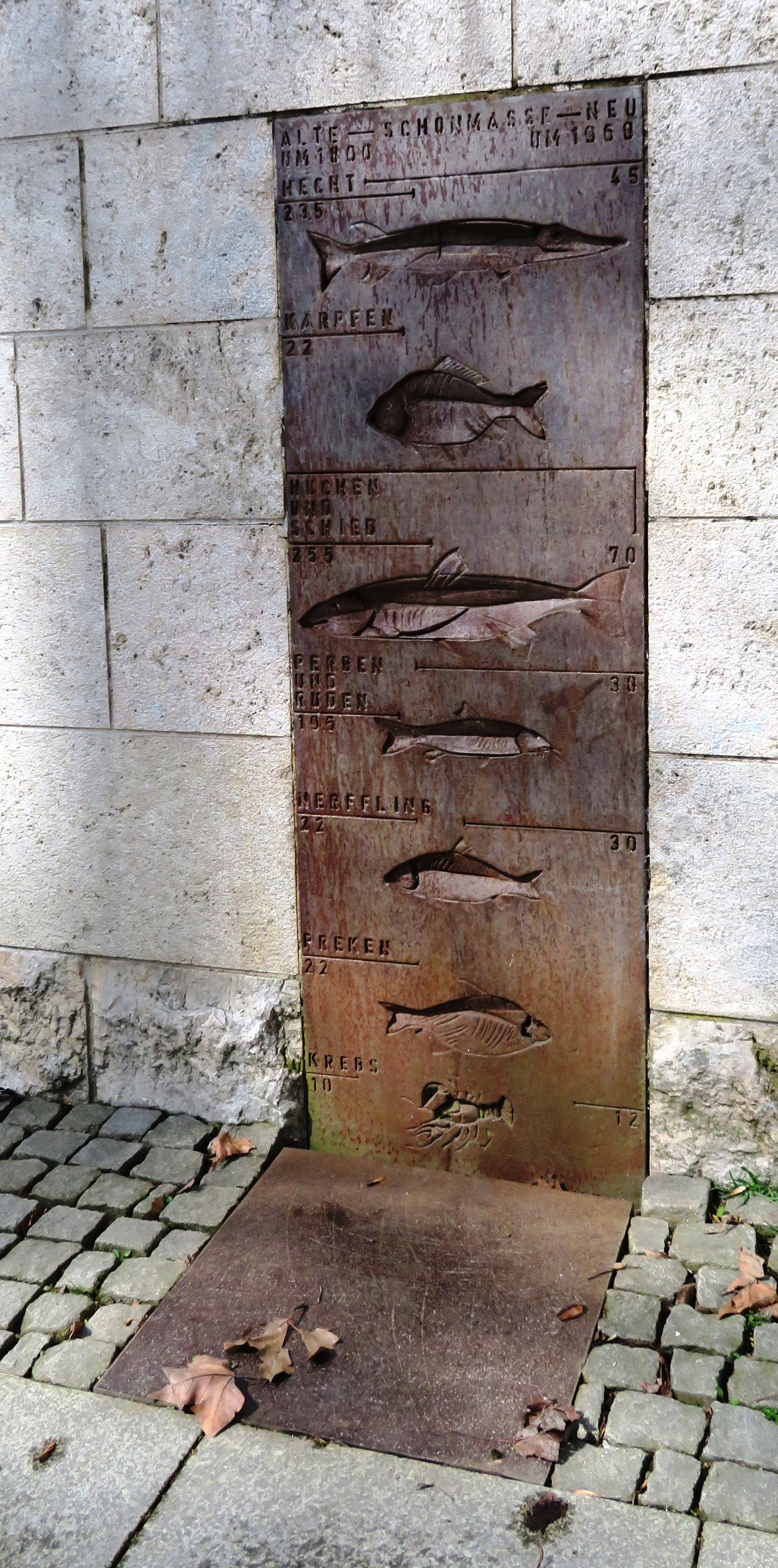
A marker indicating minimum fish landing sizes at a site in Ingolstadt, Germany

The minimum landing size (MLS) is the smallest fish measurement at which it is legal to keep or sell a fish. The MLS depends on the species of fish. Sizes also vary around the world, as they are legal definitions which are defined by the local regulatory authority. Commercial trawl and seine fisheries can control the size of their catch by adjusting the mesh size of their nets.

== Effect of selection on fish sizes ==
The idea behind this limitation is that only the older, mature fish get taken, leaving juveniles behind to continue breeding and propagating their species. There is some criticism of this legal requirement, however, as it applies selection pressure to the fish: as the larger fish get taken, the genes for larger size are reduced or removed from the gene pool, while fish that mature at a smaller size continue breeding. The average size of fish shrinks over time. This has led to a collapse in the amount of fish being caught in some fisheries.

Aboriginal Australians around Moreton Bay had a practice based on traditional knowledge which avoided this pitfall. The mullet is a migratory fish, being present around different areas of Moreton Island at different times of the year. Traditional knowledge said that at some points of their migration path, people could only harvest smaller fish, since the larger (and older) fish needed to pass on their knowledge of the migration path. If the older fish were taken at this point, the mullet would swim away from the shore, to the open sea, and this food source would be lost forever. This explanation does not align with scientific knowledge of fish migration, however, the practice did sustain the fishery for several thousand years. Taking only smaller fish applied selection pressure which encouraged the fish to grow to a larger size faster. The area and season at which the traditional knowledge said that fish of all sizes could be taken just so happened to be a point after the mullets' annual spawn, and so did not have a detrimental effect on the future population size.

== See also ==
- European Fishery MLS
- List of harvested aquatic animals by weight
- Fisheries-induced evolution
