= Light level geolocator =

Electronic tracking device

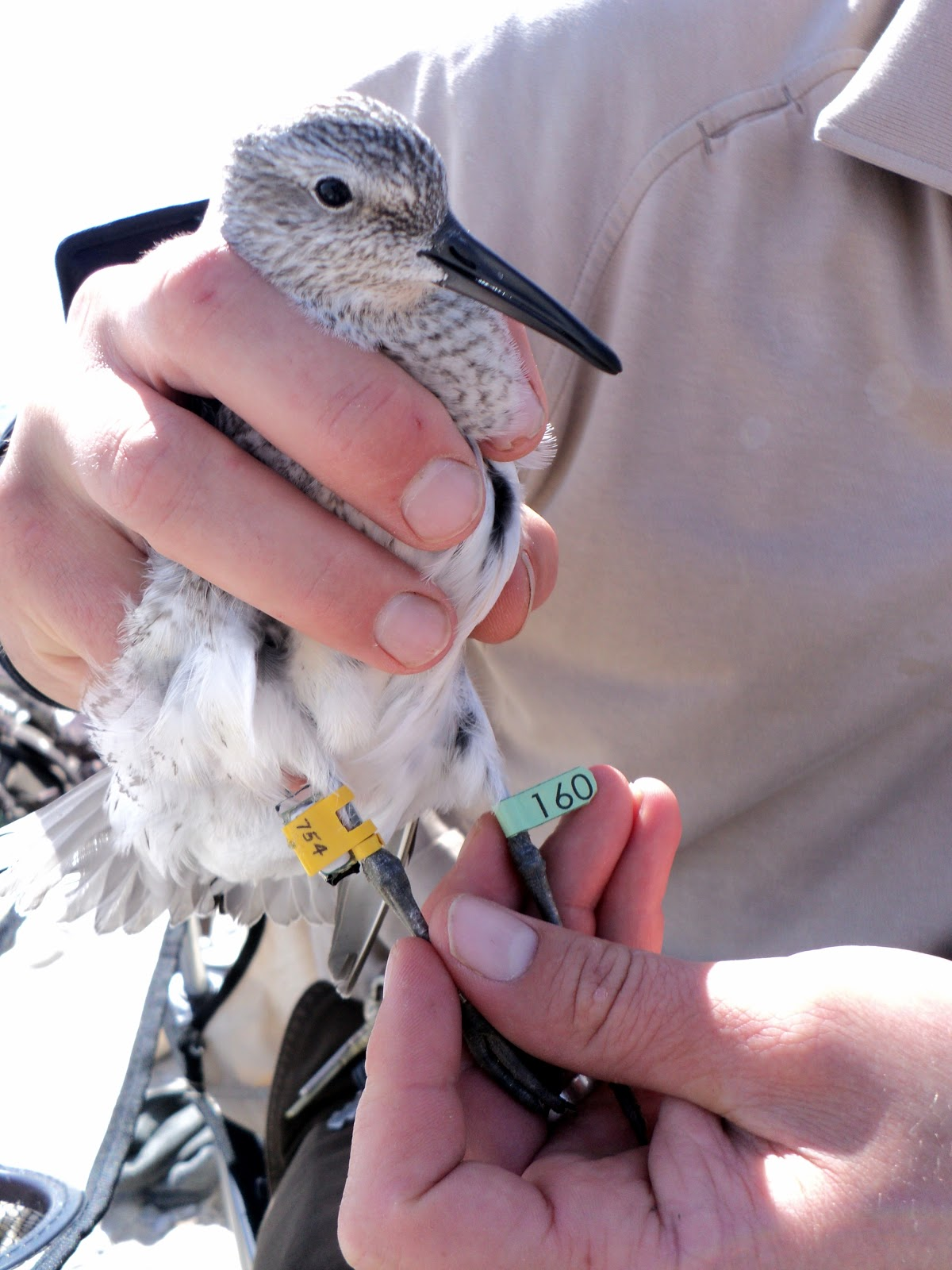
A red knot equipped with a GLS

A light level geolocator, light-level logger or global location sensor (GLS) is a lightweight, electronic archival tracking device, usually used in bird migration research to map migration routes, identify important staging areas, and sometimes provide additional ecological information. A geolocator periodically records ambient light level (solar irradiance) to determine location.

== History ==
Mathematical formulas for calculating global positions based on sunset and sunrise were first described by Gemma Frisius in 1530. Due to the lack of accurate clocks, his theoretical work could not be applied for two centuries before John Harrison produced a sufficiently accurate clock. Animal tracking using light level data appears to have been first carried out on elephant seals. Although not described until 1992, the first device to be developed was reportedly in 1989 as an adaptation of a TDR (time-depth recorder) and called a geographic location, time-depth recorder (GLTDR) weighing 196g. Also in 1992 was a publication by a different group with a similar design (weight 113g) who called it a global location sensor (GLS) though no field use was mentioned.

The use of dedicated light level recorders for tracking birds was pioneered in the 1990s by engineer, Vsevolod Afanasyev, and scientists at the British Antarctic Survey (BAS) who first developed a device in an attempt to record the movements of juvenile wandering albatross during the many years between fledging and returning to their colony to breed. From albatrosses and other seabirds the use of geolocators has been extended to other migratory species, including waders, wildfowl, raptors and songbirds as designs have become gradually smaller and more energy efficient.

== Methods ==
Light level geolocators primarily use an electronic light sensor to record light level and may also make other measurements to aid geolocation (e.g. temperature or water immersion). The smallest are archival types that do not use satellite or radio telemetry to offload data, and recapture of the bird is necessary to obtain the data. The disadvantage of having to recapture is offset by the miniature size to which archival loggers can be made. By using low power design techniques and data compression they can record data for long periods of time.

Recording light levels over time produces data that can be used to calculate latitude and longitude readings of a bird's long-distance movements. The traditionally used 'threshold analysis method' requires only twilight data accurately time-stamped. Typically, daylight length (the time between dawn and dusk) is used to determine latitude, while the mid-time between a dawn and dusk is used to determine longitude. In this way, two position fixes can be obtained daily. Other analysis techniques can include analysis of the dawn and dusk curve (rate of change of light), or use the noon light level to attempt cloud compensation. The location data so derived is not as accurate as that from GPS or PTT (platform transmitter terminal) tracking involving satellites, but the devices can be made considerably lighter and cheaper. Other sensors, such as for recording temperature, or whether the logger is wet or dry, may be used in conjunction with the light-level logging in order to provide further ecological information. The devices may be attached to the bird being tracked by a harness, or to the band on the bird's leg. The weights of geolocators range from 0.3g upwards, with a battery life of 6 months to 5 years.

The main accuracy limitation of light level geolocation is due to the uncertainty in the amount of attenuation of the ambient light level at any particular time. Light attenuation can have many causes e.g. cloud, feathers, foliage, topography. Because of this, the quality of the resulting location calculations varies with species, tag attachment technique, habitat and behaviour.
