= European Fishery MLS =

In European Union member states, there exists a standard set of minimum landing sizes (MLS) for all major species of finfish and shellfish. These MLS are set under EU Council Regulation 850/98.

Species	Image	MLS	MLS Skagerrak/Kattegat
Cod; Gadus morhua		350 mm	300 mm
Haddock; Melanogrammus aeglefinus		300 mm	270 mm
Saithe (Coalfish); Pollachius virens		350 mm	300 mm
Pollock; Pollachius pollachius		300 mm	–
European Hake; Merluccius merluccius		270 mm	300 mm
Megrim; Lepidorhombus spp.		200 mm	250 mm
Sole; Soleidae or solea		240 mm	240 mm
Plaice; Pleuronectes platessa		270 mm	270 mm
Whiting; Merlangius merlangus		270 mm	230 mm
Common ling; Molva molva		630 mm	–
Blue ling; Molva dipterygiall		700 mm	–
Bass; Dicentrarchus labrax		420 mm	–
Norway lobster; Nephrops norvegicus		85 mm	130 (40) mm
Mackerel; Scomber spp.		200 mm (300 mm in North Sea)	200 mm
Herring; Clupea harengus		200 mm	180 mm
Horse mackerel; Trachurus spp.		150 mm	150 mm
Sardine; Sardina pilchardus		110 mm	–
European lobster; Homarus gammarus		87 mm	220 mm (78 mm)
Spinous spider crab; Maia squinado		Male: 130 mm Female: 120 mm	–
Queen scallop; Chlamys spp.		40 mm	–
Grooved carpetshell; Ruditapes decussatus		40 mm	–
Carpetshell; Venerupis pullastra		38 mm	–
Short-necked clam; Ruditapes philippinarum		35 mm	–
Clam; Venus verruosa		40 mm	–
Smooth clam; Callista chione		60 mm	–
Atlantic jackknife clam; Ensis spp.		100 mm	–
Surf clam; Spisula solida		25 mm	–
Donax clam; Donax spp.		25 mm	–
Bean solen; Pharus legumen		65 mm	–
Whelk; Buccinum undatum		45 mm	–
Octopus; Octopus vulgaris		750 grams	–
Swordfish; Xiphias gladius		1250 mm or 25 kg ^{lower mandible}	–
Atlantic bluefin tuna; Thunnus thynnus		700 mm or 6.4 kg	–
Crayfish; Palinurus spp.		95 mm	–
Deepwater rose shrimp; Parapenaeus longirostris		22 mm	–

== See also ==
- List of harvested aquatic animals by weight
