= Mixed stock fishery =

A mixed stock fishery is a fishery whose stock consists of fish that are of a variety of ages, sizes, species, geographic or genetic origins or any combination of these variables. Mixed stock fisheries offer a challenge to fisheries managers due to the difficulty in targeting fish of a specific type using many commercial fishing methods.
