= Marine Conservation Alliance =

Seafood Industry Association

Marine Conservation Alliance (MCA)
- Type: Nonprofit
- Industry: seafood coalition
- Founded: 2001; Alaska
- Defunct: 3 November 2019
- Headquarters: 4005 20th Avenue W Ste 115 Seattle, WA 98199 & 2 Marine Way, Suite 227 Juneau, AK 99801
- Website: marineconservationalliance.org

The Marine Conservation Alliance (MCA) is a Juneau, Alaska-based coalition of seafood processors, harvesters, support industries and coastal communities that participate in Alaska fisheries. The coalition was established in 2001 by fishery associations, communities, Community Development Quota (CDQ) groups, harvesters, processors and support businesses, to promote science-based conservation measures to ensure sustainable Alaska fisheries.

After its initial formation, MCA worked to address regional fisheries management issues and promote science-based fishery management practices. Alaska produces more than half the United States' seafood and MCA looks for practical solutions to conservation concerns to promote long term ocean health, sustainable fisheries, and the communities that depend on them. The organization works with Alaska fishery participants and communities to educate them about regulations and laws that affect Alaska's fisheries such as the reauthorization of the Magnuson-Stevens Fishery Conservation and Management Act, and regulations to address Endangered Species Act issues. Today, MCA is working on issues including habitat protection, catch shares, bycatch, and Coastal and Marine Spatial Planning.

In 2003, MCA created a foundation to tackle issues related to the commercial fishing industry in Alaska such as bycatch and marine debris. The Marine Conservation Alliance Foundation (MCAF) brings fishermen and scientists together to address problems, initiate research and find workable solutions. NOAA has been a strong supporter of this program including a 2009 grant through NOAA's Ocean Service, Office of Response and Restoration, to track, coordinate and fund the disposal or marine debris which washes up on Alaska shores. MCAF has removed over 1.9 million pounds of debris from Alaska beaches so far.

MCA was recognized for its conservation work with the 2008 National Marine Fisheries Service (NMFS) Sustainable fisheries Leadership Award for Coastal Habitat Restoration, and most recently, MCA was awarded the 2010 Alaska SeaLife Center's Award for Stewardship and Sustainability at the Alaska Marine Gala in Anchorage. This award was created to recognize outstanding achievements in marine focused media, industry, research, education and resource management.

== Articles ==
- The Media is the Message Pitchengine.com
- Thanks for Cleaning Up the Coasts Juneau Empire
- Commercial fisheries pack a $6 billion impact in Alaska Alaska Journal
- Alaskan fisheries ninth-largest in the world FIS.com
- A Real Fish Story New York Times
- Bernton, Hal (February 5, 2009). "Global warming spurs commercial fishing moratorium in U.S. Arctic". The Seattle Times. Archived from the original on May 29, 2010.
- Aleutian Images Wavelength Magazine Online
- MCA Receives Alaska Ocean Leadership Award Seward Phoenix Log
- Scientists: Fishery Closure Needed for Sea Lions Associated Press
- 2007 Interview with MCA's Dave Benton Mongabay.com

== See also ==
- Overfishing
