= Kai Chan =

Canadian environmental scientist

- Born: Kai Ming Adam Chan
- Education: University of Toronto (BSc), Princeton University (MA, PhD)
- Known for: Ecosystem services, Relational values, Environmental governance
- Scientific career
- Fields: Ecology, Sustainability science, Environmental ethics
- Workplaces: University of British Columbia
- Doctoral advisor: Simon A. Levin
- Website: CHANS Lab

Kai Ming Adam Chan is a Canadian ecologist and professor at the University of British Columbia (UBC). He is a faculty member at the Institute for Resources, Environment and Sustainability and holds a Canada Research Chair (Tier 1) in Re-Wilding and Social-Ecological Transformation. Chan's work focuses on applied ecology, sustainability science, and environmental ethics.

== Education ==
Chan earned a BSc in Ecology from the University of Toronto in 1997. He later attended Princeton University, where he received a MA in 1999 and a PhD in 2003 in Ecology and Evolutionary Biology. His doctoral dissertation, titled The Effects of Slightly Leaky Prezygotic Isolating Barriers and the Use of Phylogenetic Tree Shape to Study Diversification, was supervised by Simon A. Levin.

== Research interests ==
Chan’s research examines the interactions between human societies and ecological systems, with an emphasis on sustainability and conservation. His work has contributed to the study of ecosystem services, particularly in relation to the social and cultural factors that shape how individuals and communities value nature. He has been involved in developing the concept of relational values, which considers how environmental decisions are influenced by social relationships, identities, and responsibilities.

He directs the Connected Human and Natural Systems (CHANS) Lab at UBC, which conducts interdisciplinary research integrating natural and social sciences. Research areas include biodiversity conservation, ecosystem-based management, environmental ethics, and sustainability transitions. The lab also engages with stakeholders and communities in the context of environmental planning and policy.

== Publications and contributions ==
Chan has published extensively on topics related to ecology, conservation biology, and sustainability science, including peer-reviewed journal articles, book chapters, and technical reports. His research has appeared in academic journals such as Science, Nature Sustainability, Ecology Letters, and Conservation Biology.

He is known for his contributions to the study of cultural ecosystem services and for his role in developing the concept of relational values. This work has informed policy discussions related to ecosystem-based management and environmental governance.

He served as a founding Lead Editor of People and Nature, a journal of the British Ecological Society, which focuses on interdisciplinary research exploring relationships between people and the natural environment.

Chan has been active in international science-policy initiatives, notably as a Coordinating Lead Author for the Intergovernmental Science-Policy Platform on Biodiversity and Ecosystem Services (IPBES). His work with IPBES has included global assessments of biodiversity and ecosystem services and the integration of diverse value frameworks into environmental policy processes.

In addition to his academic contributions, Chan has authored opinion articles for Canadian media outlets such as The Globe and Mail, Vancouver Sun, and the Toronto Star, where he has written on topics including climate change, biodiversity conservation, and sustainability policy.

In 2023, Chan delivered a TEDx talk titled "Special Agents, Rubik’s Cubes, and How to Solve the Climate Crisis" at TEDxSurrey. In the talk, he explored the complexity of the climate crisis and argued that mitigating it will require transformative change across social, political, and ecological systems.

== Community engagement and advocacy ==
Chan is a co-founder of CoSphere (Community of Small-Planet Heroes), a public engagement initiative focused on environmental sustainability and environmental justice. The project supports collaboration among researchers, policy actors, and the general public on challenges such as climate change and biodiversity loss. CoSphere emphasizes science communication, community engagement, and the role of ethical and social considerations in ecological decision-making.
