= Monsoon trawl ban =

Fishing ban in India

The Monsoon trawl ban is a regulatory measure implemented by the Indian government to protect marine biodiversity, conserve aquatic lives, and support sustainability of livelihood in coastal communities. Introduced in the 1980s, the ban restricts fishing activities during the Monsoon of South Asia, coinciding with the breeding and spawning period of many marine animals. With its extensive coastline of over 8,100 kilometres, India has made the monsoon trawling ban a critical strategy for sustainable fishery management.

In 2015, the Government of India, for the first time, imposed a uniform fishing ban across all states from June 1 to July 31, restricting all fishing activities using motorised boats beyond 12 nautical miles away from the western coast. However, states did not support the move, and many defied the ban since fishing is a subject that falls under the state's exclusive jurisdiction as per the Indian Constitution.

== Background ==
India's coastal regions have long depended on marine fishing, with artisanal fishing practices guided by ecological knowledge and traditional customs. However, the mechanisation of fisheries in the 1960s and 1970s led to overfishing and significant ecological degradation. The widespread adoption of trawling and large-scale fishing vessel intensified fishing pressures, depleting key fish stocks and damaging marine habitat.

In response to these challenges, the Government of India began implementing seasonal fishing bans to allow fish populations to recover during critical breeding periods. The first formal monsoon trawling ban was introduced in the 1980s, with Kerala pioneering the initiative in 1988. Over time, other coastal states such as Karnataka, Tamil Nadu, and Maharashtra followed suit, tailoring their bans to local ecological and socio-economic conditions.

== Objectives ==
The objectives of the trawling ban are:

1. Marine Conservation: Protecting spawning fish and juvenils during their breeding cycles to ensure stock replenishment.
2. Sustainable fishery: Stabilising fish stocks so that it can support the viability of fishing. By preventing overfishing during the breeding period, the ban help improve fish resource availability and safeguard the livelihoods of fisherfolk dependent on fishing.
3. Ecosystem management: By stopping fishing by mechanised methods like trawling, which disrupts marine habitats, the ban helps preserve the seabed, coral reefs, and other underwater ecosystems essential for maintaining the productivity of marine life.

== Implementation and enforcement ==
The monsoon trawling bans are state-specific, with varying durations and enforcement mechanisms. Kerala enforces a 52-day ban on mechanised trawling in the first half of June. Tamil Nadu and Karnataka implement bans lasting 45 to 61 days, adjusted to local ecological conditions.

The bans primarily target mechanised trawlers, while artisanal fishing using traditional, less invasive methods are often granted limited access during the period. Enforcement includes coastal patrolling, monitoring by state fisheries departments, and collaboration with local fishermen communities. These efforts are aimed at ensuring compliance while addressing Illegal, unreported and unregulated fishing practices.
