= Alison Shaw =

Alison or Allison Shaw may refer to:

== People ==
- Ali Shaw, Scottish television presenter
- Alison Shaw, musician in the band Cranes
- Allison K. Shaw (born 1984), American ecologist
- Alison Shaw (rower), in the 1993 World Rowing Championships
- Alison Shaw, author of the 1998 book A Friend of the Family

== Characters ==
- Allison Shaw, character in the TV series Zoo
- Alison Shaw, character in the novel Faces of Fear
