= Sally Archibald =

South African scientist

- Education: University of Witwatersrand
- Awards: 2012 George Mercer Award
- Scientific career
- Fields: Botanist and Fire Ecologist

Sally Archibald is a South African scientist and Professor at the University of Witwatersrand. Her research primarily focuses on savanna ecosystems within the context of global climate change as well as the exploration of fire ecology and earth-system feedbacks. Archibald was the recipient of the 2012 Mercer Award for her co-authorship of the paper "Tree cover in sub-Saharan Africa: Rainfall and fire constrain forest and savanna as alternative stable states".

== Early life and education ==
Sally Archibald attended the University of Cape Town in Cape Town, Western Cape from 2000 to 2002 where she received her MSc in botany. In 2010, Archibald received her PhD in ecology from the University of Witwatersrand in Johannesburg, Gauteng.

== Career and research ==
Archibald began her career at the University of Cape Town as a researcher in the Department of Biological Sciences from 1999 to 2000. Her primary research centered on assessing the ecological status and reserve selection of urban freshwater systems. From 2007 to 2009, Archibald served as the Visiting Student Research Collaborator in the Department of Ecology and Evolutionary Biology at Princeton University in Princeton, New Jersey. Archibald was the Principal Researcher at the Council for Scientific and Industrial Research (CSIR), located in Pretoria, Guateng in the Natural Resources and Environmental Research area from 2005 to 2014.

Archibald is currently a Professor of Animal, Plant and Environmental Sciences at the University of Witwatersrand where she has taught since 2012. She teaches undergraduate courses in Fundamentals of Ecology, Whole Plant Physiology, and Functional Ecology in Changing Environments.

Archibald's work incorporates ecological data gathered from the field, remote sensing, biogeochemistry and modeling. Archibald is involved in research projects at Yale University, the University of Edinburgh and the University of Liverpool, and is also working on research projects with the Global Change and Ecosystems group at the CSIR where she studies topics ranging from the relationship between fire and animal grazers, land-atmosphere feedbacks and savannas around the world.

== Awards and honors ==
Sally Archibald and one of her co-authors, Carla Staver, were the 2012 recipients of the George Mercer Award for their paper "Tree cover in sub-Saharan Africa: Rainfall and fire constrain forest and savanna as alternative stable states" which was published in Ecology in 2011. The George Mercer Award is presented to a researcher under the age of 40 who has authored an outstanding ecological research paper within the past two years. The committee selected Archibald and Staver due to their application of ecological theory to the exploration of the feedbacks that impact global vegetation patterns. The research added many contributions to the field of ecology including that transitions from forest to savannah along tropical latitudes result from changing fire patterns and will occur in the near future.

== Selected publications ==
Sally Archibald has published over 120 works which have been cited over 8,000 times. Her research focuses on savanna ecology, global climate change, fire ecology, vegetation dynamics and earth-system feedbacks. Some of Archibald's most cited works are listed here.

- Staver, A. C.; Archibald, S.; Levin, S. A. (2011). "The Global Extent and Determinants of Savanna and Forest as Alternative Biome States". Science. 334 (6053): 230–232. Bibcode:2011Sci...334..230S. doi:10.1126/science.1210465. PMID 21998389. S2CID 11100977.
- Archibald, Sally; Roy, David P.; Van Wilgen, Brian W.; Scholes, Robert J. (2009). "What limits fire? An examination of drivers of burnt area in Southern Africa". Global Change Biology. 15 (3): 613–630. Bibcode:2009GCBio..15..613A. doi:10.1111/j.1365-2486.2008.01754.x. hdl:10019.1/113064. S2CID 53330863.
- Archibald, S.; Bond, W. J.; Stock, W. D.; Fairbanks, D. H. K. (2005). "Shaping the Landscape: Fire–Grazer Interactions in an African Savanna". Ecological Applications. 15 (1): 96–109. Bibcode:2005EcoAp..15...96A. doi:10.1890/03-5210.
- Staver, A. Carla; Archibald, Sally; Levin, Simon (2011). "Tree cover in sub-Saharan Africa: Rainfall and fire constrain forest and savanna as alternative stable states". Ecology. 92 (5): 1063–1072. Bibcode:2011Ecol...92.1063S. doi:10.1890/10-1684.1. PMID 21661567.
- Lehmann, C. E. R.; Anderson, T. M.; Sankaran, M.; Higgins, S. I.; Archibald, S.; Hoffmann, W. A.; Hanan, N. P.; Williams, R. J.; Fensham, R. J.; Felfili, J.; Hutley, L. B.; Ratnam, J.; San Jose, J.; Montes, R.; Franklin, D.; Russell-Smith, J.; Ryan, C. M.; Durigan, G.; Hiernaux, P.; Haidar, R.; Bowman, D. M. J. S.; Bond, W. J. (2014). "Savanna Vegetation-Fire-Climate Relationships Differ Among Continents". Science. 343 (6170): 548–552. Bibcode:2014Sci...343..548L. doi:10.1126/science.1247355. PMID 24482480. S2CID 45942940.
- Lehmann, Caroline E. R.; Archibald, Sally A.; Hoffmann, William A.; Bond, William J. (2011). "Deciphering the distribution of the savanna biome". New Phytologist. 191 (1): 197–209. doi:10.1111/j.1469-8137.2011.03689.x. PMID 21463328.
