= Nandi Olive Leslie =

American mathematician

- Education: Howard University, Princeton University
- Scientific career
- Fields: Mathematics
- Workplaces: Raytheon Technologies
- Doctoral advisor: Simon Asher Levin

Nandi Olive Leslie is an applied mathematician and senior engineering fellow at Raytheon Technologies.

== Early life and education ==
Leslie grew up in Evanston, Illinois where her father, Joshua Leslie, was a professor of mathematics at Northwestern University. She enrolled in university math programs at Northwestern and would accompany her father to various math conferences and speeches around the United States.

Leslie graduated magna cum laude with a B.S. in Mathematics from Howard University and then a M.A. and PhD in Applied and Computational Mathematics and Ecology and Evolutionary Biology from Princeton University. Her thesis at Princeton was Spatial Stochastic Models for Forest Degradation and Deforestation in Bolivia and Brazil.

== Professional career ==
Leslie serves as a Senior Engineering Fellow at Raytheon Technologies and currently serves as the Raytheon Intelligence and Space Internal Research Development Chief Engineer and Chief Data scientist. Her research interests include machine learning, stochastic processes, cybersecurity, and sensor performance. In 2019, Leslie became the first African American woman at Raytheon to achieve the distinction of engineering fellow. She currently serves on five different scientific advisory boards and was received the Black Engineer of the Year Award for Outstanding Technical Contribution in Industry in 2020.

Beginning in 2020, Leslie has served as a Lecturer and Research Advisor for Master's Degree Theses and Computational Mathematics and Data Science Programs at Johns Hopkins University.
