= Simon A. Levin =

American ecologist

- Born: April 22, 1941 (age 85)
- Education: Johns Hopkins University (BA); University of Maryland (PhD)
- Awards: National Medal of Science (2014); Kyoto Prize (2005); Tyler Prize for Environmental Achievement (2014)
- Scientific career
- Fields: Ecology; Mathematical and theoretical biology
- Workplaces: Princeton University; Cornell University; Santa Fe Institute
- Doctoral students: Alan Hastings; Louis J. Gross; Kai Chan; Helene Muller-Landau; Joshua B. Plotkin; Juliet Pulliam; Allison K. Shaw; Carla Staver

Simon Asher Levin (born April 22, 1941) is an American ecologist and the James S. McDonnell Distinguished University Professor in Ecology and Evolutionary Biology and the director of the Center for BioComplexity at Princeton University. He specializes in using mathematical modeling and empirical studies in the understanding of macroscopic patterns of ecosystems and biological diversities.

== Education ==
Levin received his B.A. from Johns Hopkins University. He went on to receive his Ph.D. from University of Maryland in mathematics, which is part of the University of Maryland College of Computer, Mathematical, and Natural Sciences.

== Career ==
At Cornell University 1965–1992, he was chair of the Section of Ecology and Systematics, and then director of the Ecosystems Research Center, the Center for Environmental Research and the Program on Theoretical and Computational Biology, as well as Charles A. Alexander Professor of Biological Sciences (1985–1992).

In 1992, Professor Levin published his highly cited paper, titled "The Problem of Pattern and Scale in Ecology".

Since 1992, he has been at Princeton University, where he is currently the James S. McDonnell Distinguished University Professor in Ecology and Evolutionary Biology and director of the Center for BioComplexity. He retains an adjunct professorship at Cornell, where he still has many valued colleagues, and is a distinguished visiting professor at Arizona State University.

His research interests are in understanding how macroscopic patterns and processes are maintained at the level of ecosystems and the biosphere, in terms of ecological and evolutionary mechanisms that operate primarily at the level of organisms; in infectious diseases; and in the interface between basic and applied ecology.

Levin is a Fellow of the American Academy of Arts and Sciences, the American Association for the Advancement of Science, and the American Mathematical Society, a Member of the National Academy of Sciences and the American Philosophical Society, and a Foreign Member of the Istituto Veneto. He is a University Fellow of Resources for the Future, a Fellow of the Beijer Institute of Ecological Economics, a Fellow of the Society for Industrial and Applied Mathematics, a Fellow of the Society for Mathematical Biology, a Fellow of the American Mathematical Association, and a Distinguished Fellow of the Luohan Academy.

He also has received honorary doctorates from Eastern Michigan University, Whittier College (2004), Michigan State University, McMaster University, and the University of Victoria.

He chaired the governing council for IIASA for more than five years and was vice-chair from 2009 to 2012. He serves on the science board of the Santa Fe Institute, which he co-chaired from 2007 to 2010. He is also vice-chair for mathematics of the Committee of Concerned Scientists. Levin is a former president of the Ecological Society of America and the Society for Mathematical Biology, and a past chair of the board of the Beijer Institute of Ecological Economics.

He won the MacArthur Award (1988), Distinguished Service Citation (1998) and the Eminent Ecologist Award (2010) of the Ecological Society of America, the Okubo Award of the Society for Mathematical Biology and the Japanese Society for Theoretical Biology, and the Distinguished Scientist Award of the American Institute for Biological Sciences. He was honored with the Dr. A.H. Heineken Prize for Environmental Sciences by the Royal Netherlands Academy of Arts and Sciences (2004), the Kyoto Prize in Basic Sciences (2005) by the Inamori Foundation, and the Margalef Prize (2010) of the Government of Catalonia, the Luca Pacioli Prize from Ca’Foscari University of Venice, Italy, the Tyler Prize for Environmental Achievement (2014), the National Medal of Science (2014, announced 2015, awarded 2016), and most recently, the BBVA Foundation Frontiers of Knowledge Award in Ecology and Conservation Biology (2022).

Levin has mentored more than 100 graduate students and postdoctoral fellows, and has published widely. He is the editor of the influential Princeton Guide to Ecology and the landmark Encyclopedia of Biodiversity.

== Awards and distinctions ==
- 1988 – Robert H. MacArthur Award from the Ecological Society of America
- 1998 – Distinguished Service Award from the Ecological Society of America
- 2000 – Elected to the National Academy of Sciences.
- 2001 – Okubo Prize from the Society for Mathematical Biology and the Japanese Society for Mathematical Biology
- 2004 – Heineken Prize for Environmental Sciences from the Royal Netherlands Academy of Arts and Sciences
- 2004 – Honorary Doctor of Humane Letters (L.H.D.) from Whittier College
- 2005 – Kyoto Prize for Basic Sciences.
- 2007 – Beijer Fellow
- 2007 – American Biological Sciences Distinguished Scientist Award.
- 2010 – Ramon Margalef Prize in Ecology and Environmental Sciences of the Generalitat of Catalonia.
- 2010 – Eminent Ecologist Award from the Ecological Society of America.
- 2014 – Tyler Prize for Environmental Achievement.
- 2014 – National Medal of Science.
- 2021 – BBVA Foundation Frontiers of Knowledge Awards in Ecology and Conservation Biology.
- 2026 – Elected Fellow of the Royal Society.
