= World Forum of Fish Harvesters and Fish Workers =

World Forum of Fish Harvesters and Fish Workers: Forum Mondial des Pecheurs et Travaillerurs de la Peche; Foro Mundial de Pescadores y Trabajadores de la Pesca
- Headquarters: Kampala, Uganda
- Official languages: English; French; Spanish
- Membership: 48 national organizations in 42 countries

Leaders
  - Co-Presidents: (Uganda) Margaret Nakato; (Iceland) Arthur Bogasaon

Establishment
- Website

The World Forum of Fish Harvesters and Fishworkers (WFF) is an international non-governmental organization that works towards the establishment and upholding of fundamental human rights, social justice and culture of fish harvesters and fish workers, affirming the sea as the source of all life and committing themselves to sustain fisheries and aquatic resources from the present and future generations in order to protect their livelihood.

The WFF is a response and also a search for alternatives to a kind of globalization that understands that the human sense of life overrides trade and the laws of the neoliberal market. It was founded in Quebec, Canada in 1995 after a number of fishworker organizations and concerned intellectuals, academics and social activists felt that while the World Trade Organization (WTO)’s Doha mandate declared that the priority of the current round of negotiations is to lift people out of poverty and promote sustainable development, the current WTO negotiations fail to incorporate their concerns and priorities, as well as those of traditional fishing communities everywhere.

The WFF currently represents 48 national organizations of traditional small-scale fishing communities in 42 nations, whose livelihoods depend directly on the sustainable management of fisheries resources. It acts as a world body representing the concerns of traditional fishing communities whose survival is directly threatened by the reduction of the role of governments in regulating fisheries.

The organization has four principal organs: the General Assembly (the main deliberative assembly); the Regional Councils (in charge of ensuring the coordination of the regional members); the Coordination Committee (in charge of representing the WFF); and the Executive Committee (in charge of handling all administrative and financial matters). The WFF's most public figures are the WFF's co-presidents, currently Margaret Nakato and Arthur Bogason (both since 2009). The organization is mainly funded from membership fees, donations, grants or any other source deemed acceptable by the Coordination Committee. The organization has three official languages: English, Spanish and French.

== History ==
The WFF was formed in 1995 as the result of a meeting between national organizations for coastal fishing and the fishing industry in the city of Québec. The first general meeting of the forum took place in New Delhi in 1997. Following the actual establishment of the global organization in November 1997, the WFF's Coordinating Committee met in Brussels and, in October 1999, the Committee held its first meeting in the United States at Point Montara, California. A new general assembly was held in Lisbon in 2004. The current Constitution of the WFF replaced the WFF Interim Charter of 1997.

== Organization ==
The WFF is based on four primary organs: the General Assembly, the Coordination Committees, an Executive Committee, and the Regional Councils. The head office of the WWF has been situated in Uganda since February 2010, hosted by the Katosi Women Development Trust (KWDT).

=== General Assembly ===
The General Assembly constitutes the WFF's highest authority. It takes place at least once every three years in a location decided by the Coordination Committee.

The functions of the General Assembly are to make official interpretations of and amendments to the constitution of the WFF, to discuss issues of common interest and adopt resolutions on subjects on the agenda, within a spirit of cooperation and of exchange of ideas, to decide on the action required to implement decisions and fulfill the objectives of the WFF and to assign tasks or duties to the Coordination Committee.

The General Assembly is composed of all the delegates representing members who attend the meeting. Each country, with at least one active member shall be entitled to representation at the General Assembly by two delegates, one of whom shall be male and the other female. Large countries, as designated by the Coordination Committee, shall be entitled to a third delegate. Each active member is entitled to nominate auditors and/or alternate delegates to participate at the General Assembly with the right to speak. This auditors or delegates must be approved by the Coordination Committee. Countries with more than one active member shall try to agree on the delegates’ representation.

Each delegate has the right to vote on any item put before the General Assembly. Votes involving constitutional approval and amendments, suspension or expulsion of a member, and the dissolution of the WFF, shall require a two-thirds majority vote of delegates voting and shall also require the support of a simple majority (50 + 1%) of the countries which are represented by delegates at the General Assembly. All other decisions of the General Assembly shall be made by simple majority of the number of votes cast. However, a consensus should always be tried to be reached in the decision-making process.

=== Coordination Committee ===
The Coordination Committee acts under the authority of the General Assembly to represents the WFF. The mandate for the members of the Coordination Committee lasts for the period until the next General Assembly, which will normally be for three years. Each member of the Coordination Committee has the right to one vote. Decisions by the Committee are taken by simple majority.

Other than the duties that may be delegated by the General Assembly, the Coordination Committee is also in charge of promoting the creation of regional councils, planning and managing the activities of the WFF, organizing the General Assembly, proposing recommendations to the General Assembly, implement measures decided upon by the General Assembly, representing the WFF with other organizations, admitting new members, reporting on its activities to the General Assembly, maintaining close links among members of the WFF during periods in which the General Assembly is not in session and taking any measures deemed necessary to accomplish the objectives set out by the organization.

=== Executive committee ===
The Executive Committee acts under the authority of the Coordination Committee and is in charge of handling all administrative and financial matters of the WFF. It shall be composed of five representatives elected from among the members of the coordination committee. There shall be one president, two vice-presidents, one secretary, and one treasurer. The mandate of the Executive Committee members shall be for a maximum term of three years. Meetings may be called by the President or Secretary without previous notice and should be held in the time and place that they determine.

=== Regional Councils ===
The WFF recognizes any regional council which complies with the objectives of the WFF. The main goal of the regional councils is to ensure the coordination and the consultation of the regional members from the countries representing the regions and continents.

== Membership ==
The WFF currently represents 48 national organizations of traditional small-scale fishing communities in 42 nations located all over the world, whose livelihoods depend directly on the sustainable management of fisheries resources. Such organizations must be democratically constituted and represent one of the following groups: Fish harvesters, crewmembers of fishing units, organizations of women engaged in work in support of the fishery, and fish workers who are engaged in activities related to the processing, sale (excluding merchants) or transport of fish. The Coordination Committee is the one in charge of admitting active members to the organization.

== Stated objectives ==
The WFF works towards the establishment and upholding of fundamental human rights, social justice and culture of fish harvesters and fish workers, affirming the sea as source of all life and committing themselves to sustain fisheries and aquatic resources from the present and future generations, to protect their livelihood. The objectives of the WFF are the ones that follow:

- To protect, defend, and strengthen the economic viability and quality of life for fish harvesters, fish workers and the communities that depend on the fishery for their livelihood.
- To assist member organizations to secure and improve upon the economic viability and quality of life of fish harvesters, fish workers and their communities.
- To create an understanding of the resource as a common heritage of humanity and, through sustainable fishing practices, conservation and the regeneration of marine and inland resources and ecosystems, to ensure that it is passed on to future generations.
- To promote food security, both locally and worldwide, by sustaining fish stocks for the future, and by reserving fish for human consumption.
- To prevent the export of resource collapse crises and of technologies and practices that lead to these crises.
- To acknowledge and enhance the unique culture of fishing communities.
- To protect fishing communities, fish resources and fish habitats such as coastal zones, watersheds and mangroves, from both land-based and sea-based threats. These include displacement by tourism, pollution (including the use of sea as a dumping ground for toxic waste), destructive industrial aquaculture, overfishing and destructive fishing practices.
- To promote a legal regime that will ensure the traditional and customary rights of fishing communities to the fishery under the national jurisdiction.
- To establish and assert the rights of fishing communities to their customary territories in the coastal zone, under their national jurisdiction for fishing and habitation.
- To play a monitoring role to ensure that states and transnational corporations comply with relevant international agreements and to oppose any trade agreements that threaten the livelihood of fishers.
- To promote the primary role of fish harvester and fish worker organizations in managing fisheries and oceans nationally and internationally.
- To promote equitable representation of fish harvester and fish worker organizations in all relevant regional and international fora and to advocate their recognition.
- To provide support for national and international struggles that are consistent with the objectives of the World Forum.
- To encourage, assist and support fish harvesters and fish workers to organize where they have not already done so.
- To promote the right of fish harvesters and fish workers to social security, safe working conditions, fair income and safety at sea, as well as their recognition as seafarers.
- To recognize, protect and enhance the role of women in the fishing economy and in the sustenance of the community.
- To improve the communication between fish harvesters and the scientific community through the exchange of knowledge and science.
