= Sustainable fishery =

Sustainable fishing for the long term fishing

A conventional idea of a sustainable fishery is that it is one that is harvested at a sustainable rate, where the fish population does not decline over time because of fishing practices. Sustainability in fisheries combines theoretical disciplines, such as the population dynamics of fisheries, with practical strategies, such as avoiding overfishing through techniques such as individual fishing quotas, curtailing destructive and illegal fishing practices by lobbying for appropriate law and policy, setting up protected areas, restoring collapsed fisheries, incorporating all externalities involved in harvesting marine ecosystems into fishery economics, educating stakeholders and the wider public, and developing independent certification programs.

Some primary concerns around sustainability are that heavy fishing pressures, such as overexploitation and growth or recruitment overfishing, will result in the loss of significant potential yield; that stock structure will erode to the point where it loses diversity and resilience to environmental fluctuations; that ecosystems and their economic infrastructures will cycle between collapse and recovery; with each cycle less productive than its predecessor; and that changes will occur in the trophic balance (fishing down marine food webs).

== Overview ==
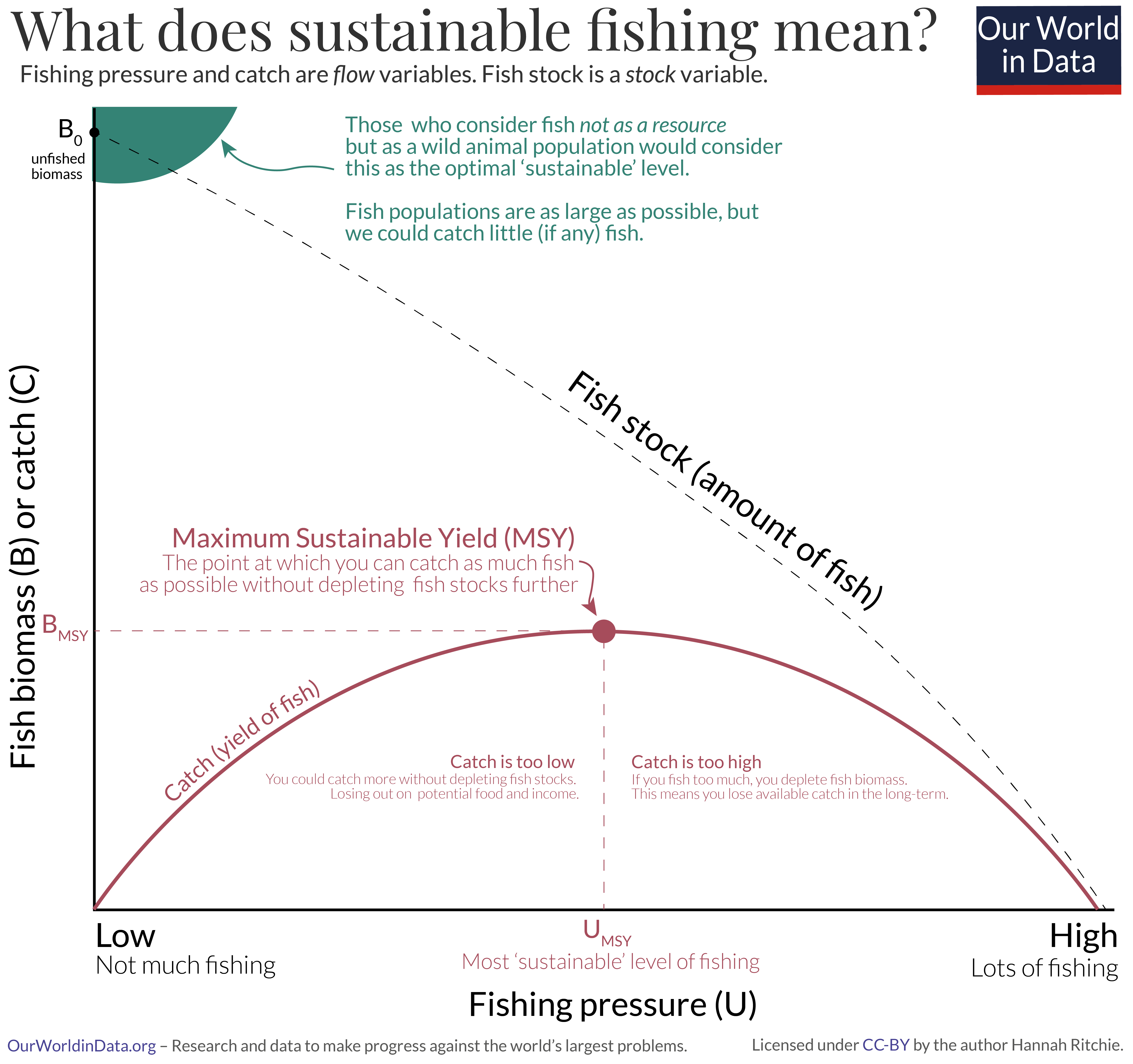
Sustainability can mean different things to different people. Some may view sustainable fishing to be catching very little in order for fish populations to return to their historical levels (represented by the upper left green area), while others consider sustainability to be the maximum amount of fish we can catch without depleting stocks any further (red dot). Most research, industry and policy backs the second view: viewing fish as a resource.

Global wild fisheries are believed to have peaked and begun a decline, with valuable habitats, such as estuaries and coral reefs, in critical condition. Current aquaculture or farming of piscivorous fish, such as salmon, does not solve the problem because farmed piscivores are fed products from wild fish, such as forage fish. Salmon farming also has major negative impacts on wild salmon. Fish that occupy the higher trophic levels are less efficient sources of food energy.

A report at the High-level Political Forum on Sustainable Development in 2021 stated that: "Sustainable fisheries accounted for approximately 0.1 per cent of global GDP in 2017".

== History ==
In his 1883 inaugural address to the International Fisheries Exhibition in London, Thomas Huxley asserted that overfishing or "permanent exhaustion" was scientifically impossible, and stated that probably "all the great sea fisheries are inexhaustible". In reality, by 1883 marine fisheries were already collapsing. The United States Fish Commission was established 12 years earlier for the purpose of finding why fisheries in New England were declining. At the time of Huxley's address, the Atlantic halibut fishery had already collapsed (and has never recovered).

=== Traditional management of fisheries ===
Traditionally, fisheries management and the science underpinning it was distorted by its "narrow focus on target populations and the corresponding failure to account for ecosystem effects leading to declines of species abundance and diversity" and by perceiving the fishing industry as "the sole legitimate user, in effect the owner, of marine living resources." Historically, stock assessment scientists usually worked in government laboratories and considered their work to be providing services to the fishing industry. These scientists dismissed conservation issues and distanced themselves from the scientists and the science that raised the issues. This happened even as commercial fish stocks deteriorated, and even though many governments were signatories to binding conservation agreements.

== Defining sustainability ==
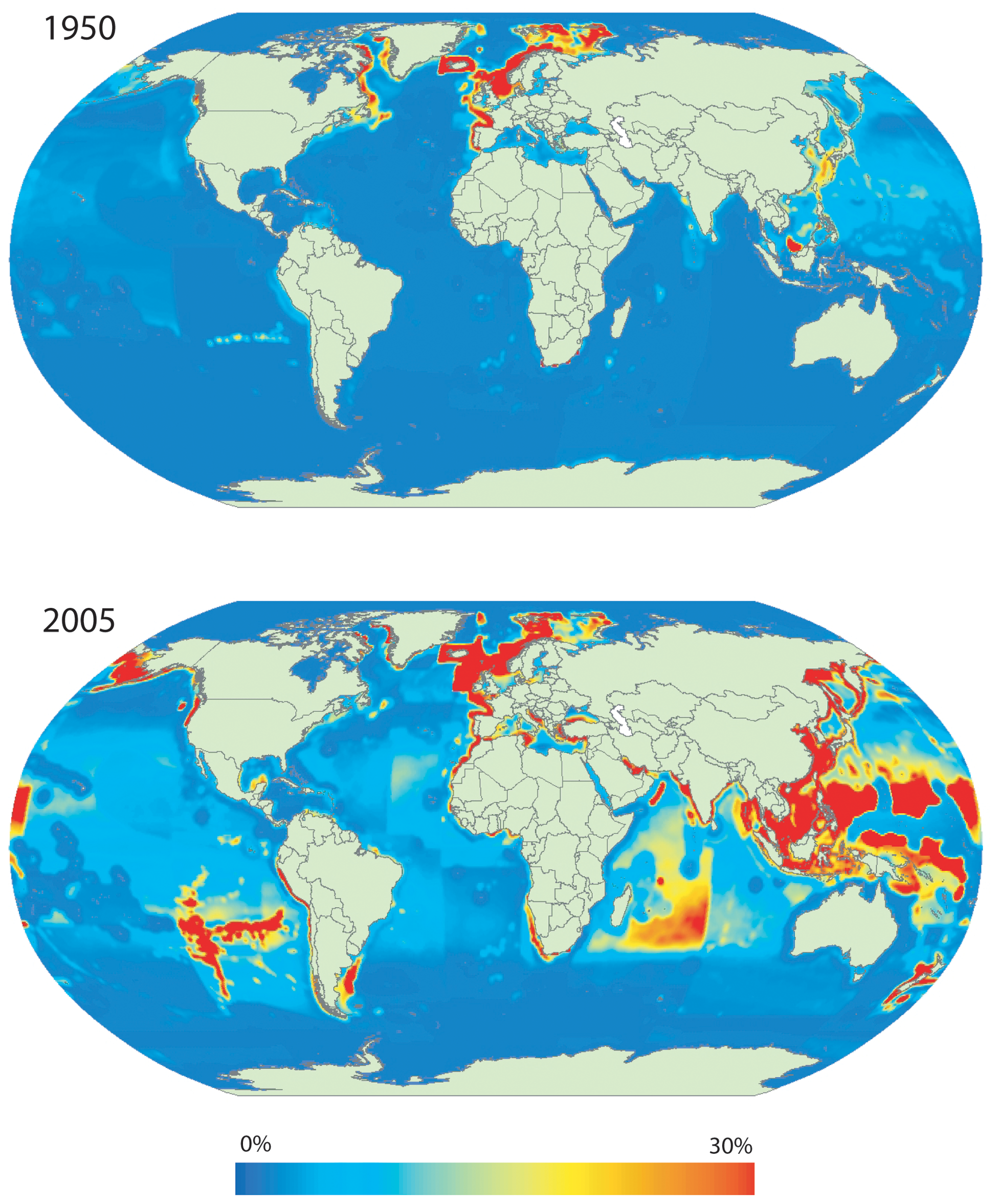
Primary production required (PPR) to sustain global marine fisheries landings expressed as percentage of local primary production (PP). The maps represent total annual landings for 1950 (top) and 2005 (bottom). Note that PP estimates are static and derived from the synoptic observation for 1998.

Three ways of defining a sustainable fishery exist:

- Long term constant yield is the idea that undisturbed nature establishes a steady state that changes little over time. Properly done, fishing at up to maximum sustainable yield allows nature to adjust to a new steady state, without compromising future harvests. However, this view is naive, because constancy is not an attribute of marine ecosystems, which dooms this approach. Stock abundance fluctuates naturally, changing the potential yield over short and long-term periods.
- Preserving intergenerational equity acknowledges natural fluctuations and regards as unsustainable only practices which damage the genetic structure, destroy habitat, or deplete stock levels to the point where rebuilding requires more than a single generation. Providing rebuilding takes only one generation, overfishing may be economically foolish, but it is not unsustainable. This definition is widely accepted.
- Maintaining a biological, social and economic system considers the health of the human ecosystem as well as the marine ecosystem. A fishery which rotates among multiple species can deplete individual stocks and still be sustainable so long as the ecosystem retains its intrinsic integrity. Such a definition might consider as sustainable fishing practices that lead to the reduction and possible extinction of some species.

=== Social sustainability ===
Fisheries and aquaculture are, directly or indirectly, a source of livelihood for over 500 million people, mostly in developing countries.

Social sustainability can conflict with biodiversity. A fishery is socially sustainable if the fishery ecosystem maintains the ability to deliver products the society can use. Major species shifts within the ecosystem could be acceptable as long as the flow of such products continues. Humans have been operating such regimes for thousands of years, transforming many ecosystems, depleting or driving to extinction many species.

According to Hilborn, the "loss of some species, and indeed transformation of the ecosystem is not incompatible with sustainable harvests." For example, in recent years, barndoor skates have been caught as bycatch in the western Atlantic. Their numbers have severely declined and they will probably go extinct if these catch rates continue. Even if the barndoor skate goes extinct, changing the ecosystem, there could still be sustainable fishing of other commercial species.

=== Environmental sustainability ===
The focus of sustainable fishing is often on the fish. Other factors are sometimes included in the broader question of sustainability. The use of non-renewable resources is not fully sustainable. This might include diesel fuel for the fishing ships and boats: there is even a debate about the long term sustainability of biofuels. Modern fishing nets are usually made of artificial polyamides like nylon. Synthetic braided ropes are generally made from nylon, polyester, polypropylene or high performance fibers such as ultra high modulus polyethylene (HMPE) and aramid.

Energy and resources are employed in fish processing, refrigeration, packaging, logistics, etc. The methodologies of life-cycle assessment are useful to evaluate the sustainability of components and systems. These are part of the broad question of sustainability.

== Obstacles ==
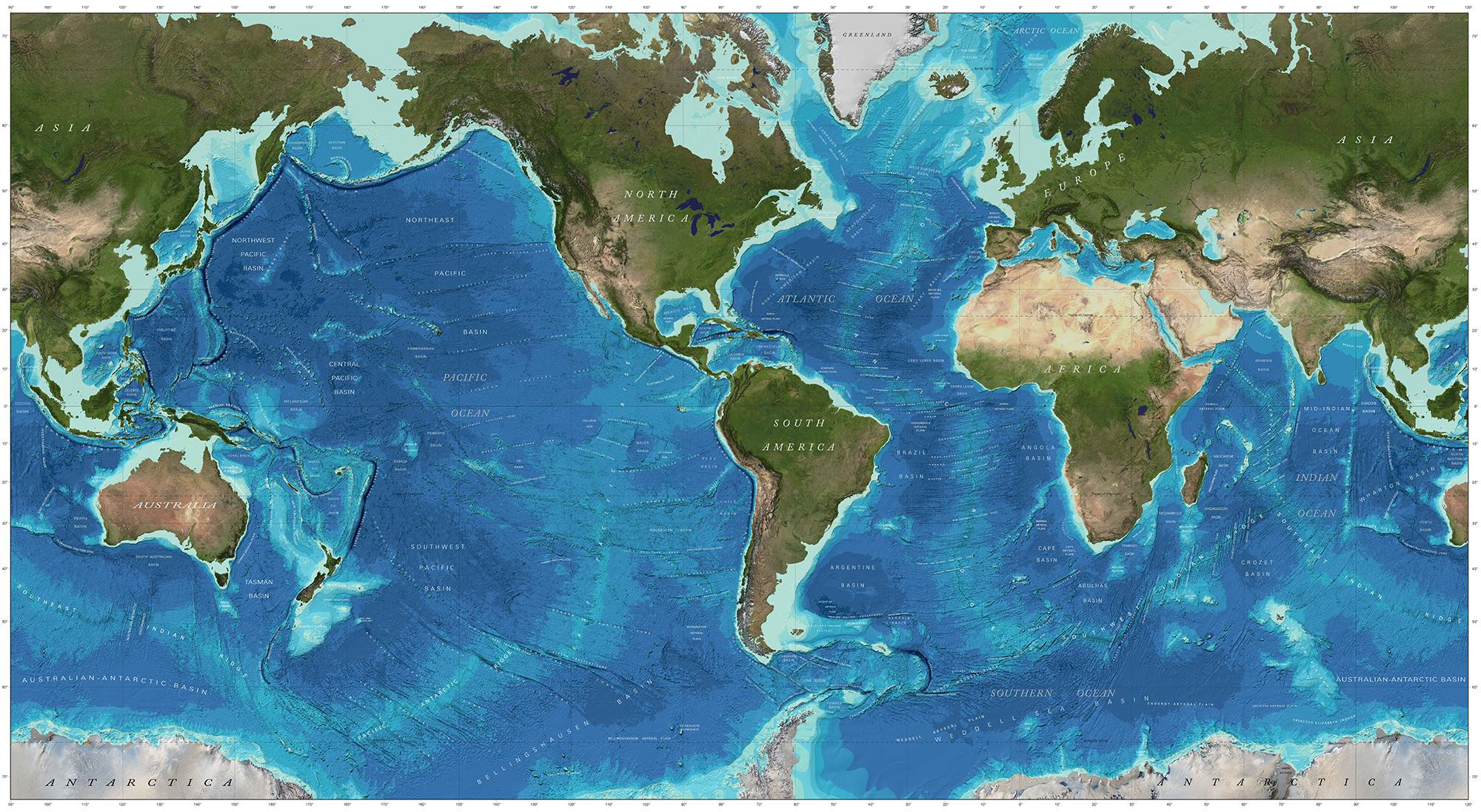
Highlighted in light green are the continental shelves, home to the most productive fishing areas in the world. Large areas have been destroyed by heavy bottom trawls.

=== Overfishing ===
Global trends in the state of the world's marine fishery stocks, 1974 - 2023

Overfishing is traditionally defined as harvesting so many fish that the yield is less than it would be if fishing were reduced. For example, Pacific salmon are usually managed by trying to determine how many spawning salmon, called the "escapement", are needed each generation to produce the maximum harvestable surplus. The optimum escapement is that needed to reach that surplus. If the escapement is half the optimum, then normal fishing looks like overfishing. But this is still sustainable fishing, which could continue indefinitely at its reduced stock numbers and yield. There is a wide range of escapement sizes that present no threat that the stock might collapse or that the stock structure might erode. According to Hilborn, overfishing can be "a misallocation of societies' resources", but it does not necessarily threaten conservation or sustainability".

On the other hand, overfishing can precede severe stock depletion and fishery collapse. Hilborn points out that continuing to exert fishing pressure while production decreases, stock collapses and the fishery fails, is largely "the product of institutional failure". Today over 70% of fish species are either fully exploited, overexploited, depleted, or recovering from depletion. If overfishing does not decrease, it is predicted that stocks of all species currently commercially fished for will collapse by 2048.

A Hubbert linearization (Hubbert curve) has been applied to the whaling industry, as well as charting the price of caviar, which depends on sturgeon stocks. Another example is North Sea cod. Comparing fisheries and mineral extraction tells us that human pressure on the environment is causing a wide range of resources to go through a Hubbert depletion cycle.

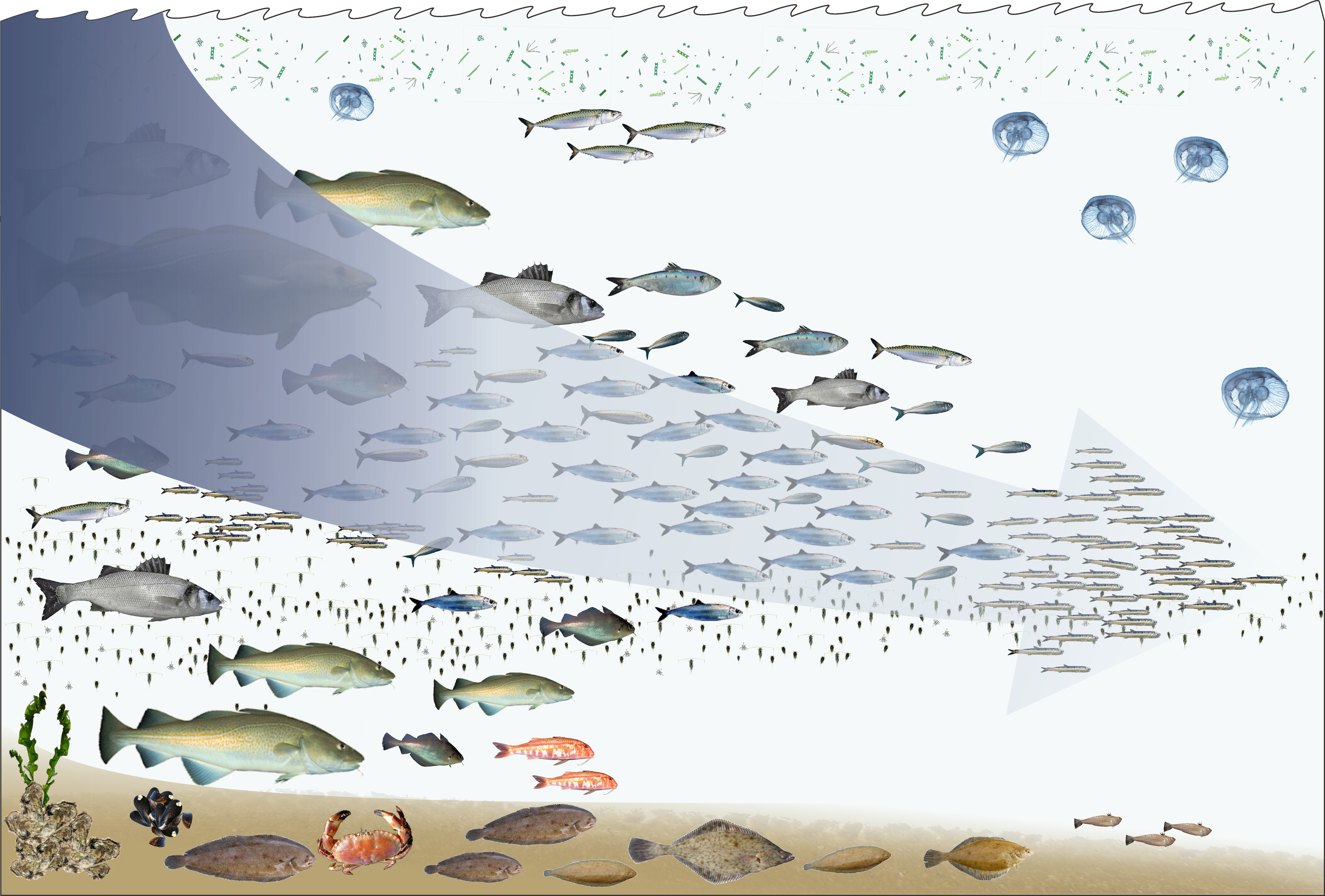
Fishing down the food web

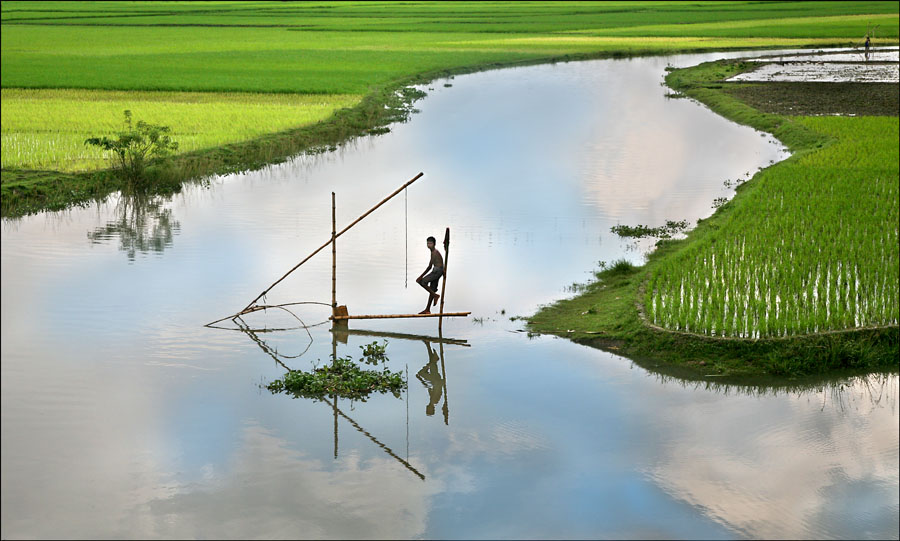
Coastal fishing communities in Bangladesh are vulnerable to flooding from sea-level rises.

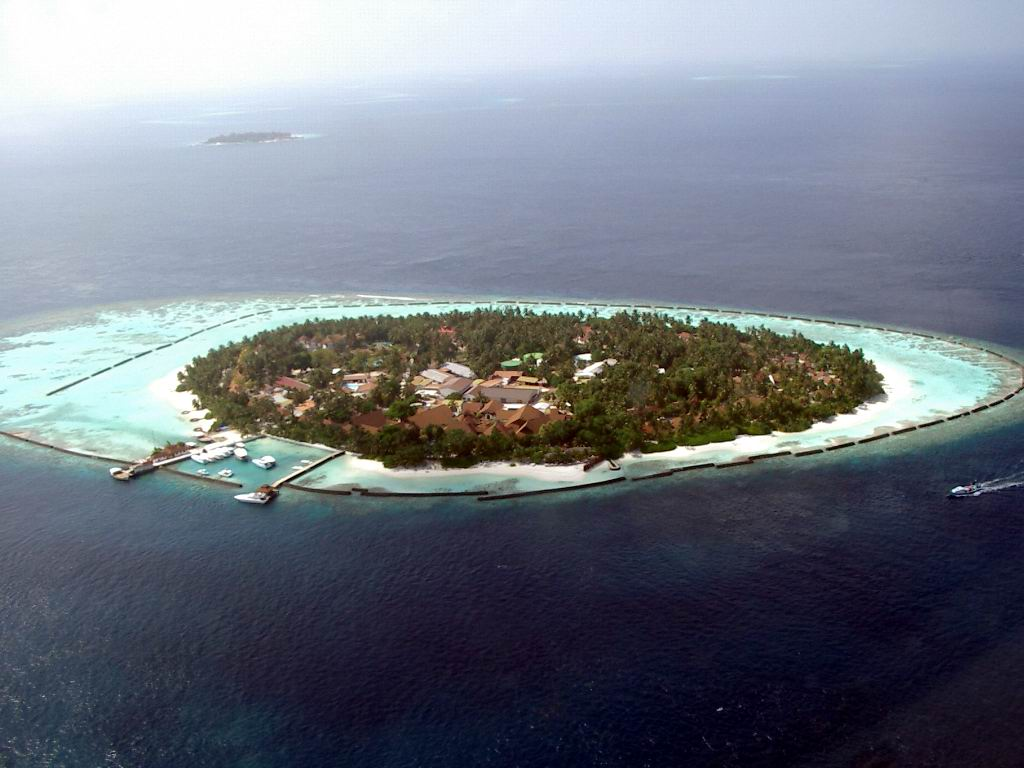
Island with fringing reef in the Maldives. Coral reefs are dying around the world.

Shrinking of the Aral Sea

=== Habitat modification ===
Nearly all the world's continental shelves, and large areas of continental slopes, underwater ridges, and seamounts, have had heavy bottom trawls and dredges repeatedly dragged over their surfaces. For fifty years, governments and organizations, such as the Asian Development Bank, have encouraged the fishing industry to develop trawler fleets. Repeated bottom trawling and dredging literally flattens diversity in the benthic habitat, radically changing the associated communities.

Habitat loss also extends to coastal vegetation. Mangrove forests act as breeding and nursery grounds that support larger numbers of fish, crustaceans and shellfish, which many small-scale fisheries depend on for food and income. More than four million people fish in mangroves worldwide, and the forests are an important source of food security in many countries. Since the 2000s, however, these forests have shrunk by about 0.5 percent a year, and that loss reduces the habitat the fisheries rely on. Since 1950 up until 2009, 90 percent of 25 species of big predator fish have gone.

=== Climate change ===
Rising ocean temperatures and ocean acidification are radically altering aquatic ecosystems. Climate change is modifying fish distribution and the productivity of marine and freshwater species. This reduces sustainable catch levels across many habitats, puts pressure on resources needed for aquaculture, on the communities that depend on fisheries, and on the oceans' ability to capture and store carbon (biological pump). Sea level rise puts coastal fishing communities at risk, while changing rainfall patterns and water use impact on inland (freshwater) fisheries and aquaculture. As climate change causes oceans to warm up, fish are forced to move away, into cooler Northern waters. This can cause overcrowding in these areas.

=== Ocean pollution ===
A recent survey of global ocean health concluded that all parts of the ocean have been affected by human development and that 41 percent has been fouled with human polluted runoff, overfishing, and other abuses. Pollution is not easy to fix, because pollution sources are so dispersed, and are built into the economic systems we depend on.

The United Nations Environment Programme (UNEP) mapped the impacts of stressors such as climate change, pollution, exotic species, and over-exploitation of resources on the oceans. The report shows at least 75 percent of the world's key fishing grounds may be affected.

== Remediation ==
=== Fisheries management ===
Fisheries management draws on fisheries science to enable sustainable exploitation. Modern fisheries management is often defined as mandatory rules based on concrete objectives and a mix of management techniques, enforced by a monitoring control and surveillance system.

- Ideas and rules: Economist Paul Romer believes sustainable growth is possible providing the right ideas (technology) are combined with the right rules, rather than simply hectoring fishers. There has been no lack of innovative ideas about how to harvest fish. He characterizes failures as primarily failures to apply appropriate rules.
- Fishing subsidies: Government subsidies influence many of the world fisheries. Operating cost subsidies allow European and Asian fishing fleets to fish in distant waters, such as West Africa. Many experts reject fishing subsidies and advocate restructuring incentives globally to help struggling fisheries recover.
- Economics: Another focus of conservationists is on curtailing detrimental human activities by improving fisheries' market structure with techniques such as salable fishing quotas, like those set up by the Northwest Atlantic Fisheries Organization, or laws such as those listed below.
- Valorization of by-catch: helping to avoid discards (and their associated adverse ecological impacts) by valorizing by-catch products, as they are good sources for protein hydrolizates, peptones, enzymatic mixtures or fish oil being these products of interest different industrial sectors.
- Payment for Ecosystem Services: Environmental economist Essam Y Mohammed argues that by creating direct economic incentives, whereby people are able to receive payment for the services their property provides, will help to establish sustainable fisheries around the world as well as inspire conservation where it otherwise would not.
- Sustainable fisheries certification: A promising direction is the independent certification programs for sustainable fisheries conducted by organizations such as the Marine Stewardship Council and Friend of the Sea. These programs work at raising consumer awareness and insight into the nature of their seafood purchases.
- Ecosystem based fisheries: See next section

=== Ecosystem based fisheries ===
We propose that rebuilding ecosystems, and not sustainability per se, should be the goal of fishery management. Sustainability is a deceptive goal because human harvesting of fish leads to a progressive simplification of ecosystems in favour of smaller, high turnover, lower trophic level fish species that are adapted to withstand disturbance and habitat degradation.

— Tony Pitcher and Daniel Pauly

According to marine ecologist Chris Frid, the fishing industry points to marine pollution and global warming as the causes of recent, unprecedented declines in fish populations. Frid counters that overfishing has also altered the way the ecosystem works:

Everybody would like to see the rebuilding of fish stocks and this can only be achieved if we understand all of the influences, human and natural, on fish dynamics. ... fish communities can be altered in a number of ways, for example they can decrease if particular-sized individuals of a species are targeted, as this affects predator and prey dynamics. Fishing, however, is not the sole cause of changes to marine life—pollution is another example.... No one factor operates in isolation and components of the ecosystem respond differently to each individual factor.

The traditional approach to fisheries science and management has been to focus on a single species. This can be contrasted with the ecosystem-based approach. Ecosystem-based fishery concepts have been implemented in some regions. In a 2007 effort to "stimulate much needed discussion" and "clarify the essential components" of ecosystem-based fisheries science, a group of scientists offered the following ten commandments for ecosystem-based fisheries scientists:

- Keep a perspective that is holistic, risk-averse and adaptive.
- Maintain an "old growth" structure in fish populations, since big, old and fat female fish have been shown to be the best spawners, but are also susceptible to overfishing.
- Characterize and maintain the natural spatial structure of fish stocks, so that management boundaries match natural boundaries in the sea.
- Monitor and maintain seafloor habitats to make sure fish have food and shelter.
- Maintain resilient ecosystems that are able to withstand occasional shocks.
- Identify and maintain critical food-web connections, including predators and forage species.
- Adapt to ecosystem changes through time, both short-term and on longer cycles of decades or centuries, including global climate change.
- Account for evolutionary changes caused by fishing, which tends to remove large, older fish.
- Include the actions of humans and their social and economic systems in all ecological equations.

=== Marine protected areas ===
Strategies and techniques for marine conservation tend to combine theoretical disciplines, such as population biology, with practical conservation strategies, such as setting up protected areas, as with Marine Protected Areas (MPAs) or Voluntary Marine Conservation Areas. Each nation defines MPAs independently, but they commonly involve increased protection for the area from fishing and other threats.

Marine life is not evenly distributed in the oceans. Most of the really valuable ecosystems are in relatively shallow coastal waters, above or near the continental shelf, where the sunlit waters are often nutrient rich from land runoff or upwellings at the continental edge, allowing photosynthesis, which energizes the lowest trophic levels. In the 1970s, for reasons more to do with oil drilling than with fishing, the U.S. extended its jurisdiction, then 12 miles from the coast, to 200 miles. This made huge shelf areas part of its territory. Other nations followed, extending national control to what became known as the exclusive economic zone (EEZ). This move has had many implications for fisheries conservation, since it means that most of the most productive maritime ecosystems are now under national jurisdictions, opening possibilities for protecting these ecosystems by passing appropriate laws.

Daniel Pauly characterises marine protected areas as "a conservation tool of revolutionary importance that is being incorporated into the fisheries mainstream." The Pew Charitable Trusts have funded various initiatives aimed at encouraging the development of MPAs and other ocean conservation measures.

=== Sustainable Fish Farming ===
Over the years, fish farming has made a name for itself in the fishing industry as a means of ensuring that the world's fish supplies do not deplete so rapidly. Sometimes referred to as "aquaculture", fish farming, when done right, can be one a very environmentally-friendly way to harvest fish. Fish farms are regulated by laws and management plans, which prevents it from falling prey to the same phenomenon of overfishing, which cripples the fish populations and marine ecosystem as a whole. The basic premise of fish farming is just what it sounds like—to breed and raise fish in enclosed environments, then eventually sell the grown fish as food for consumers. Salmon, cod, and halibut are three types of finfish that are often farm-raised. The actual enclosures in which the fish grow and swim are made of mesh "cages" submerged underwater.

Because they are not catching the fish out in the open ocean, fish farmers are able to control the environment in which the fish exist. Sustainable fish farming practices do not use dangerous chemicals, hormones, or antibiotics on their fish, which benefits the surrounding marine environment, and the human consumers themselves. In addition to this, sustainable fish farming is able to control what their fish eat: farmers will take care to keep the fish's diet healthy and balanced. Conversely, one of the most unsustainable practices within the fish farming industry occurs is when farmers feed the fish pellets of animal waste. The quality of ocean water in and around fish farms is up to the farmers to maintain, and due to the fact that the mesh cages take up only a certain amount of space in the ocean, fish farmers can ensure that waste and other byproducts are not polluting the water. Everything from fish oils to fish skin may be incorporated into something new: for example, fish oils can become a beneficiary supplement for both animals and humans.

=== Laws and treaties ===
International laws and treaties related to marine conservation include the 1966 Convention on Fishing and Conservation of Living Resources of the High Seas. United States laws related to marine conservation include the 1972 Marine Mammal Protection Act, as well as the 1972 Marine Protection, Research and Sanctuaries Act which established the National Marine Sanctuaries program. Magnuson-Stevens Fishery Conservation and Management Act.

=== Reconciling fisheries with conservation ===
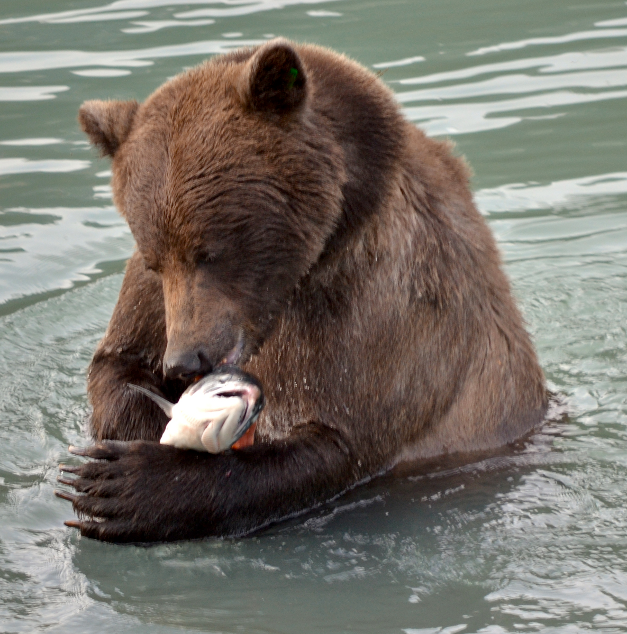
Management goals might consider the impact of salmon on bear and river ecosystems.

At the Fourth World Fisheries Congress in 2004, Daniel Pauly asked, "How can fisheries science and conservation biology achieve a reconciliation?", then answered his own question, "By accepting each other's essentials: that fishing should remain a viable occupation; and that aquatic ecosystems and their biodiversity are allowed to persist."

A relatively new concept is relationship farming. This is a way of operating farms so they restore the food chain in their area. Re-establishing a healthy food chain can result in the farm automatically filtering out impurities from feed water and air, feeding its own food chain, and additionally producing high net yields for harvesting. An example is the large ranch Veta La Palma in Spain's Guadalquivir Marshes, which for some years had a productive fishery. Relationship farming was first made popular by Joel Salatin who created a 220 hectare relationship farm featured prominently in Michael Pollan's book The Omnivore's Dilemma (2006) and the documentary films, Food, Inc. and Fresh. The basic concept of relationship farming is to put effort into building a healthy food chain, and then the food chain does the hard work.

=== Awareness campaigns ===
Various organizations promote sustainable fishing strategies, educate the public and stakeholders, and lobby for conservation law and policy. The list includes the Marine Conservation Biology Institute and Blue Frontier Campaign in the U.S., The U.K.'s Frontier (The Society for Environmental Exploration) and Marine Conservation Society, Australian Marine Conservation Society, International Council for the Exploration of the Sea (ICES), Langkawi Declaration, Oceana, PROFISH, and the Sea Around Us Project, International Collective in Support of Fishworkers, World Forum of Fish Harvesters and Fish Workers, Frozen at Sea Fillets Association and CEDO.

Some organizations certify fishing industry players for sustainable or good practices, such as the Marine Stewardship Council and Friend of the Sea. Other organizations offer advice to members of the public who eat with an eye to sustainability. According to the marine conservation biologist Callum Roberts, four criteria apply when choosing seafood:

- Is the species in trouble in the wild where the animals were caught?
- Does fishing for the species damage ocean habitats?
- Is there a large amount of bycatch taken with the target species?
- Does the fishery have a problem with discards—generally, undersized animals caught and thrown away because their market value is low?

The following organizations have download links for wallet-sized cards, listing good and bad choices:

- Monterey Bay Aquarium Seafood Watch, USA
- Blue Ocean Institute, USA
- Marine Conservation Society, UK
- Australian Marine Conservation Society
- The Southern African Sustainable Seafood Initiative

=== Global goals ===
The United Nations Millennium Development Goals (MDGs) include, as goal number 7: target 2, the intention to "reduce biodiversity loss, achieving, by 2010, a significant reduction in the rate of loss", including improving fisheries management to reduce depletion of fish stocks.

In 2015, the MDGs then evolved to become the Sustainable Development Goals with Goal 14 aimed at conserving life below water. Its Target 14.7 states that "By 2030, increase the economic benefits to small island developing States and least developed countries from the sustainable use of marine resources, including through sustainable management of fisheries, aquaculture and tourism".

== Data issues ==
=== Data quality ===
One of the major impediments to the rational control of marine resources is inadequate data. According to fisheries scientist Milo Adkison (2007), the primary limitation in fisheries management decisions is poor data. Fisheries management decisions are often based on population models, but the models need quality data to be accurate. Scientists and fishery managers would be better served with simpler models and improved data. Estimates of illegal catch losses range between $10 billion and $23 billion annually, representing between 11 and 26 million tonnes.

=== Shifting baselines ===
Shifting baselines is the way significant changes to a system are measured against previous baselines, which themselves may represent significant changes from the original state of the system. The term was first used by the fisheries scientist Daniel Pauly in his paper "Anecdotes and the shifting baseline syndrome of fisheries". Pauly developed the term in reference to fisheries management where fisheries scientists sometimes fail to identify the correct "baseline" population size (e.g. how abundant a fish species population was before human exploitation) and thus work with a shifted baseline. He describes the way that radically depleted fisheries were evaluated by experts who used the state of the fishery at the start of their careers as the baseline, rather than the fishery in its untouched state. Areas that swarmed with a particular species hundreds of years ago, may have experienced long-term decline, but it is the level of decades previously that is considered the appropriate reference point for current populations. In this way large declines in ecosystems or species over long periods of time were, and are, masked. There is a loss of perception of change that occurs when each generation redefines what is "natural".

== See also ==
- Community-supported fishery
- The End of the Line
- Ocean Conservancy
- International Seafood Sustainability Foundation
- Worldwatch Institute
- Marine Life Protection Act
- Ocean Outcomes
- Aral Sea
- List of commercially important fish species
- Aquaculture Stewardship Council
- Marine Stewardship Council
- Sustainable seafood
