= Joshua B. Plotkin =

American biologist

- Education: Harvard University (A. B.), Princeton University (Ph.D.)
- Scientific career
- Workplaces: University of Pennsylvania
- Doctoral advisor: Simon A. Levin

Joshua B. Plotkin is an evolutionary biologist and applied mathematician. He is the Walter H. and Leonore C. Annenberg Professor of Natural Sciences at the University of Pennsylvania. Plotkin's research includes the study of the evolution of adaptation in populations, virus ecology, genetic drift, protein translation, and social norms.

He serves on the editorial boards for Science Magazine and Cell Reports.
