= Louis J. Gross =

American mathematician

- Born: January 6, 1952 (age 74); Philadelphia, Pennsylvania, US
- Education: Cornell University
- Scientific career
- Fields: Mathematics; Ecology; Evolutionary Biology
- Workplaces: University of Tennessee; Cornell University; University of California Davis; Grassland Research Institute, UK; International Centre for Theoretical Physics, Italy
- Thesis: Models of the Photosynthetic Dynamics of Fragaria virginiana (1979)
- Doctoral advisor: Simon A. Levin
- Website: www.tiem.utk.edu/~gross/

Louis J. Gross (born January 6, 1952) is distinguished professor of ecology and evolutionary biology and mathematics at the University of Tennessee. He is the founding director of the National Institute for Mathematical and Biological Synthesis and the Institute for Environmental Modeling. His research focuses on computational and mathematical ecology, with applications to plant physiological ecology, conservation biology, natural resource management, and landscape ecology.

== Education ==
Gross received a BSc degree in Mathematics from Drexel University in 1974 and a Phd in applied mathematics, with a minor in ecology and systematics from Cornell University in 1979 under the supervision of Simon A. Levin. From 1986 to 2000, while a faculty member at the University of Tennessee, he co-directed of a series of courses and workshops on mathematical aspects of ecology and environmental science at the International Centre for Theoretical Physics in Italy. These involved participants from over sixty countries, with an objective of building the scholarly infrastructure in the Third World to address environmental problems using their own talent.

== Research ==
Gross has co-edited five books, including the Encyclopedia of Theoretical Ecology and Individual-Based Models and Approaches in Ecology. He has been a leader in the development the ATLSS (Across Trophic Level System Simulation) project, one of the largest ecological modeling projects ever constructed, which has provided a critical tool in the ongoing complex restoration planning for the Everglades. The National Science Foundation has funded his research in parallel and grid computing for ecological models, ecological multi-modeling and spatial control of natural systems. He was the recipient of the 2006 Distinguished Scientist Award from the American Institute of Biological Sciences. Gross has been President of the Society for Mathematical Biology, Chair of the Board of Governors of the Mathematical Biosciences Institute, President of the Faculty Senate at UTK and Chair of the National Research Council Committee on Education in Biocomplexity Research, and Program Chair for the 2008 annual meeting of the Ecological Society of America.

He was elected a Fellow of the Ecological Society of America (2023).
