= Juliet Pulliam =

American epidemiologist (born 1979)

Juliet Rachel Crowder Pulliam (born 1979) is an American epidemiologist specializing in disease vectors and animal–human disease transmission, and in the mathematical modeling and analysis of disease outbreaks. She was formerly the head of the South African DSI-NRF Centre of Excellence in Epidemiological Modelling and Analysis (SACEMA).

== Education and career ==
Pulliam majored in biology at Duke University, graduating in 2002 with minors in mathematics and linguistics. She went to Princeton University for graduate study in ecology and evolutionary biology, earning a master's degree in 2004 and completing her Ph.D. in 2007. Her Ph.D., Determinants & Dynamics of Viral Host Jumps, was jointly supervised by Andrew P. Dobson and Simon A. Levin.

After postdoctoral research with Leslie Real at Emory University and as a RAPIDD Program Fellow at the University of California, Los Angeles and the John E. Fogarty International Center in Maryland, working with F. Ellis McKenzie & James O. Lloyd-Smith, she became an assistant professor at the University of Florida, in the Department of Biology and the Emerging Pathogens Institute.

She served as head of the South African DSI-NRF Centre of Excellence in Epidemiological Modelling and Analysis (SACEMA) from 2016 to 2023, holding at the same time an affiliation as professor of applied mathematics at Stellenbosch University. As head of SACEMA, she helped guide responses to the COVID-19 pandemic in South Africa.

== Recognition ==
Pulliam was elected to the Academy of Science of South Africa in 2023.
