= PROFISH =

Sustainable fisheries program

The Global Program on Fisheries (PROFISH) is a global program on sustainable fisheries established by the World Bank in 2005. It has been set up in conjunction with key donors and stakeholders to meet the challenge of a growing crisis in the world fisheries sector.

The World Bank characterises this crisis in the following way:

Increasing population pressures, growing demand for fish and failures of governance are leading to unsustainable levels of exploitation of living aquatic resources and destruction of aquatic ecosystems. In many developing countries the sustainable benefits are in decline, perpetuating a spiral into poverty for many small-scale fishers and communities dependent on fishing.

PROFISH is a programming and funding partnership between key fishery sector donors, international financial institutions, developing countries, stakeholder organizations, and international agencies. PROFISH currently receives financial and in-kind support from Iceland, France, Norway, Finland, Japan, FAO, World Bank, International Union for Conservation of Nature (IUCN) and WorldFish Center.

As of November 2018, the PROFISH trust fund is now part of the World Bank's Program for the Blue Economy (PROBLUE) umbrella program.

== Objectives ==
The overall objective of PROFISH is "to improve sustainable livelihoods in the fisheries sector and to make concrete progress towards meeting the goals of the WSSD's goals in fisheries".

The specific objectives are to strengthen governance of the world's marine fisheries by: (i) improving the quality of investments made by both public and private sectors; (ii) assisting countries and regions to establish roadmaps to achieve effective sector governance and reform using improved fisheries management tools; and (iii) aligning donor interventions

It is intended that PROFISH would improve sustainable livelihoods in the fisheries sector and to make concrete progress towards meeting the 2002 fisheries goals of the World Summit on Sustainable Development through three complementary activities: (i) ensuring sustainable fisheries initiatives are included in national plans and poverty reduction strategies; (ii) building national and regional consensus on pro-poor sustainable fisheries initiatives and priority activities to implement the Code of Conduct for Responsible Fisheries; and (iii) aligning and enhancing international assistance on fisheries and sustainable use of aquatic ecosystems and catalyzing implementation of agreed initiatives.

== Studies ==
A 2008 joint publication by the World Bank and the FAO, entitled The Sunken Billions: The Economic Justification for Fisheries Reform, concludes that global marine capture fisheries are an underperforming global asset and shows that the difference between the potential and actual net economic benefits from marine fisheries is in the order of $50 billion per year. This is equivalent to more than half the value of the global seafood trade. The cumulative economic loss to the global economy over the last three decades is estimated to be in the order of two trillion dollars. In many countries the catching operations are buoyed up by subsidies, so that the global fishery economy to the point of landing (the harvest sub-sector), is in deficit.
