= National Institute for Mathematical and Biological Synthesis =

- Established: March 2009
- Focus: science mathematics biology
- Key people: Nina H. Fefferman (Director); Louis J. Gross (Founding Director)
- Location: University of Tennessee, Knoxville

The National Institute for Mathematical and Biological Synthesis is a research institute focused on the science of mathematics and biology, located on the University of Tennessee, Knoxville, campus. Known by its acronym NIMBioS (pronounced NIM-bus), the Institute is a National Science Foundation (NSF) Synthesis Center supported through NSF's Biological Sciences Directorate via a Cooperative Agreement with UT-Knoxville, totaling more than $35 million over ten years.

== Background ==
The Institute opened in September 2008, with additional support from the U.S. Department of Homeland Security and the U.S. Department of Agriculture.

Since March 2009 when NIMBioS programs officially began, more than 5,000+ individuals from more than 50 countries and every U.S. state have participated in various research and educational activities.

== Goals ==
Primary goals of NIMBios are:

- to address key biological questions using cross-disciplinary approaches in mathematical biology
- to foster the development of a cadre of researchers who are capable of conceiving and engaging in creative and collaborative connections across disciplines.

To achieve its goals, NIMBioS advances a wide variety of research and outreach/education activities designed to facilitate interaction between mathematicians and biologists to arrive at innovative solutions to environmental problems. Two primary mechanisms for research are Working Groups and Investigative Workshops. Working Groups are composed of 10-15 invited participants focusing on specific questions related to mathematical biology. Each group typically meets at the Institute two to three times over the course of two years. Investigative workshops may include 30-40 participants with some invited by organizers and others accepted through an open application process. Workshops are more general in focus and may lead to working group formation. NIMBioS also provides support for post-doctoral and sabbatical fellows, short-term visitors, graduate research assistants, and faculty collaborators at UT.

== Function ==
One area of particular emphasis at NIMBioS has been modeling animal infectious diseases, such as white-nose syndrome in bats, pseudo-rabies virus in feral swine, Toxoplasma gondii in cats, and malaria from mosquitoes. As a leading international center for animal infectious disease modeling, NIMBioS has contributed significantly to global needs in analyzing the potential spread, impact and control of diseases that can move from animals to humans, such as West Nile virus, anthrax, swine flu and mad cow disease. NIMBioS also collaborates with the Great Smoky Mountains National Park to develop methods of particular interest for natural area management that are transferable to numerous U.S. locations.

NIMBioS encourages multidisciplinary participation in all its activities. Participants at NIMBioS have included behavioral biologists, ecologists, evolutionary biologists, computational scientists, anthropologists, geneticists, psychologists, bioinformaticians, mathematicians, statisticians, veterinarians, epidemiologists, and wildlife biologists.

NIMBioS has an active Education and Outreach program geared toward learners of all ages, from elementary school students through college and graduate school and the general public. NIMBioS organizes a Summer Research Experience for Undergraduates and Teachers program for eight weeks each summer. Participants live on campus and conduct research in teams with UT professors, NIMBioS researchers, and collaborators on projects at the interface of math and biology. NIMBioS also hosts the annual Undergraduate Research Conference at the Interface of Biology and Mathematics each fall, featuring student talks and posters as well as panel discussions. Programs for graduate students include the Visiting Graduate Student Fellowship offering training and research visits for up to several months by graduate students interested in pursuing research with NIMBioS senior personnel, postdoctoral fellows or working group participants.

NIMBioS provides varying levels of tutorial workshops designed to enlighten biologists about key quantitative methods, such as optimal control and optimization or high performance computing methods for analyzing biological problems involving large data sets, spatial information, and dynamics.

== Director ==
NIMBioS’ director is Nina H. Fefferman, Professor of Ecology & Evolutionary Biology and Mathematics at the UT. Louis J. Gross, Professor of Ecology & Evolutionary Biology and Mathematics at the UT served as the previous Director. NIMBioS leadership team also includes associate directors and a deputy director. NIMBioS has an external Board of Advisors from academic institutions from around the world. In addition, NIMBioS has a group of senior personnel consisting of UT faculty and Oak Ridge National Laboratory (ORNL) scientists, as well as a group of additional associated faculty and staff collaborators from UT and ORNL.

== Research ==
The need for the Institute arose out of the significant growth of the field of mathematical biology over the last decade with research becoming more closely linked to observation and experiment. Rather than starting from mathematical abstractions, it is now common for researchers to:

1. Begin with observations;
2. Use those to suggest promising methods, tools and models; and
3. Proceed to analysis, simulation, evaluation and application.

Across the spectrum of the life sciences in which mathematics has been contributing new insights, data are increasingly used to focus conceptual models as the first step in problem formulation.

== Website description ==
The NIMBioS website includes descriptions of working groups, investigative workshops, post-doctoral fellowships, sabbaticals, short-term visits, graduate assistantships, and faculty positions and information on how to submit requests for support. The web site also describes education and outreach opportunities for undergraduates, teachers, and K-12 students. The web site also has an extensive video library including interviews with visiting scientists, full-length seminars tutorials, and workshops, and short narrative science features.

== Sponsorship ==
From 2010 to 2012, NIMBioS, in conjunction with the UT's James R. Cox Endowment Fund, sponsored a Songwriter-in-Residence Program to encourage the creation and production of songs involving ideas of modern biology and the lives of scientists who pursue research in biology. A total of five songwriters were supported. Each songwriter created and produced a minimum of two songs as a result of his or her four-week residency.
