= Nina Fefferman =

American evolutionary biologist

Nina H. Fefferman (born December 20, 1978) is an American applied mathematician and theoretical biologist. Her research uses mathematical modeling to explore the behavior, evolution, and control of complex systems with application in areas from basic science (evolutionary sociobiology and epidemiology) to direct real-world applications (bio-security, cyber-security, bio-inspired design, and wildlife conservation). She studies how individual behaviors can affect an entire population, frequently focusing on a networks approach. She has written over 150 peer-reviewed journal articles and book chapters and been funded by a variety of US governmental agencies and private foundations throughout her career.

Fefferman is the founding director and PI of the US NSF Center for Analysis and Prediction of Pandemic Expansion (APPEX) and also serves as the director of the National Institute for Modeling Biological Systems (NIMBioS) (previously the National Institute for Mathematical and Biological Synthesis). Both of these organizations are based at the University of Tennessee, Knoxville, where Fefferman is also a professor in the Department of Ecology & Evolutionary Biology and the Department of Mathematics.

== Early life and education ==
Nina Fefferman is the daughter of Julie and Charles Fefferman, a mathematician at Princeton University. She is the sister of composer Lainie Fefferman.

She earned a bachelor's degree in mathematics at Princeton in 1999. She later received her master's degree in the same subject from Rutgers University in 2001 and her Ph.D. in biology from Tufts University in 2005. Her thesis focused on the use of mathematical models in evolutionary biology and epidemiology.

== Publications ==
Her most cited papers are:

- Lofgren E, Fefferman NH, Naumov YN, Gorski J, Naumova EN. Influenza seasonality: underlying causes and modeling theories. Journal of virology. 2007 Jun 1;81(11):5429-36.
- Wilson-Rich N, Spivak M, Fefferman NH, Starks PT. Genetic, individual, and group facilitation of disease resistance in insect societies. Annual review of entomology. 2009 Jan 7;54:405-23.
- Parham PE, Waldock J, Christophides GK, Hemming D, Agusto F, Evans KJ, Fefferman N, Gaff H, Gumel A, LaDeau S, Lenhart S. Climate, environmental and socio-economic change: weighing up the balance in vector-borne disease transmission. Philosophical Transactions of the Royal Society B: Biological Sciences. 2015 Apr 5;370(1665):20130551.
- Lofgren ET, Fefferman NH. The untapped potential of virtual game worlds to shed light on real world epidemics. The Lancet Infectious Diseases. 2007 Sep 1;7(9):625-9.

== Affiliation with various centers and institutes ==
In addition to serving as director of APPEX and NIMBioS, Fefferman was the director/PI and lead investigator for the PREEMPT Institute which was an NSF funded PPIP Phase I pandemic preparedness research institute.

Fefferman has also been involved in numerous other research centers. She was a principal investigator at START (US Dept of Homeland Security Center for the Study of Terrorism and Responses to Terrorism) in a research team working to understand the social behavior and algorithms involved in the extremism of terrorism. She was an active participant at DIMACS (The Center for Discrete Mathematics and Theoretical Computer Science) to aid in collaborations and conferences about mathematical macrobiology. She served as a principal investigator at CCICADA (US Dept of Homeland Security Command, Control, and Interoperability Center for Advanced Data Analysis) to research various applications of complex systems.

Fefferman was a center co-director at InForMID (Tufts University Initiative for the Forecasting and Modeling of Infectious Diseases) as a researcher and lead in the area of mathematical modeling of infectious disease epidemiology.
