= Ecosystem approach =

The ecosystem approach is a conceptual framework for resolving ecosystem issues. The idea is to protect and manage the environment through the use of scientific reasoning. Another point of the ecosystem approach is preserving the Earth and its inhabitants from potential harm or permanent damage to the planet itself. With the preservation and management of the planet through an ecosystem approach, the future monetary and planetary gain are the by-product of sustaining and/or increasing the capacity of that particular environment. This is possible as the ecosystem approach incorporates humans, the economy, and ecology to the solution of any given problem. The initial idea for an ecosystem approach would come to light during the second meeting (November 1995) at the Conference of the Parties (COP) it was the central topic in implementation and framework for the Convention on Biological Diversity (CBD), it would further elaborate on the ecosystem approach as using various methodologies for solving complex issues.

Throughout, the use and incorporation of ecosystem approaches, two similar terms have been created in that time: ecosystem-based management and ecosystem management. The Convention on Biological Diversity has seen ecosystem-based management as a supporting topic/concept for the ecosystem approach. Similarly, ecosystem management has a minor difference with the two terms. Conceptual the differences between the three terms come from a framework structure and the different methods used in solving complex issues. The key component and definition between the three terms refer to the concept of conservation and protection of the ecosystem.

The use of the ecosystem approach has been incorporated with managing water, land, and living organisms ecosystems and advocating the nourishment and sustainment of those ecological space. Since the ecosystem approach is a conceptual model for solving problems, the key idea could combat various problems.

== History ==
On December 29, 1993, the Convention on Biological Diversity (CBD) was signed and applied as a multilateral treaty. With the purpose of achieving:

1. Biodiversity
2. Sustainability of species diversity
3. Endorse genetic diversity (e.g. to maintain and endorses livestock, crops, and wildlife)

Two years after the CBD was signed, during the second meeting of the Conference of the Parties (November 1995) the representatives of the signed treaty would agree upon employing a strategy to combat the intricate and actively changing ecosystem. The ecosystem approach would represent as the equalizer for obtaining knowledge and creating countermeasures in preventing the endangerment of any ecological environment.

With the acknowledgment of the ecosystem approach, during the fifth meeting of the Conference of the Parties, a group consensus agreed on a concrete definition and elaboration for the ecosystem approach would be needed, and the Parties would request Subsidiary Body on Scientific Technical and Technological Advice (SBSTTA) to create a guideline with 12 principles and a description of the ecosystem approach. The final results are given at COP 5 Decision V/6 summary.

During the seventh meeting of the Conference of the Parties, further iteration on the ecosystem approach would be seen as a priority, during the meeting the parties would agree new implementation and strategical development could be incorporated with the ecosystem approach into the CBD. Furthermore, creating a new relationship with sustaining forest organization and the ecosystem approach was talked about. All topics and discussion regarding seventh meeting are given at COP 7 Decision Vll/11 summary.

== Ecosystem approach and management ==
With the development and use of the ecosystem approach, different variation to that form have been created and used. The two being ecosystem management and ecosystem-based management, the framework of the three methods are still the same (the conservation and protection of the ecosystem). The distinguishing part beings with how to initiate the approach of solving the problem. Ecosystem-based management (EBM) is used for projects that incorporate interaction of different levels: organisms, the ecosystem, and the human component; however, its varies from the other methods as the scale of the problem is larger and intricate. The objectives should be straightforward and condensed with important systematic information. Also, EBM considers social and cultural aspects into the solution not just only scientific reasoning. With ecosystem management, the process is similar to EBM; however, factors such as socioeconomics and politics can impact the decision and solution. A cultural aspect is also considered when creating a solution.

== Ecosystem approach for self-reliance ==
The ecosystem approach is currently being used in the fields of environmental and ocean management (i.e. the ecosystem approach does not stop there; it is being used in various fields and sub-fields as well). The goal is to address the current problems facing those fields through the use of conceptual thinking and approach that would determine a viable and sustaining solution. One example, in particular, would be pertaining to Fishery (a commercial industry in capturing and selling of fishes). In recent years, inland fisheries have quintupled from 2 million metric tons to 11 million metric tons in the span of 60 years from 1950 to 2010. Through the use of the ecosystem approach more specifically the ecosystem approach to fisheries (EAF), sometimes referred to as Ecosystem-based fisheries. EAF is seen as a framework to creating local strategies for each specific fishery ecosystem and implementing the new strategies gradually with the already existing rules and regulation. With the use of EAF if successful fishery industries could generate substantial income; as well as, improve the fragile ecosystem of aquarium species.

== See also ==
- Ecosystem
- Convention on Biological Diversity
- The Conference of the Parties
- Ecosystem management
- Ecosystem-based management
- Fishery
- Ecosystem based fisheries
