= Allison K. Shaw =

American ecologist

- Born: December 12, 1984 (age 41); Massachusetts
- Education: Brown University (Bachelors in Sciences) 2006 Princeton (Masters) 2009 Princeton (PhD) 2012
- Scientific career
- Fields: Ecology

Allison K. Shaw is an American ecologist and professor at the University of Minnesota. She studies the factors that drive the movements of organisms.

== Early life and education ==
Shaw grew up among a family of physicists; her parents, siblings, and some of her grandparents were involved in the field of physics, so she was exposed to the sciences from a young age. She received her bachelor's degree in Science in Applied Mathematics-Biology from Brown University in 2006, and went on to earn her master's degree in ecology and Evolutionary Biology from Princeton University in 2009. She continued her graduate studies at Princeton, and earned her PhD in Ecology and Evolutionary Biology in 2012. Shaw's doctoral advisers were Iain Couzin and Simon Levin.

== Career and research ==
Shaw holds the position of associate professor in the Ecology, Evolution, and Behavior department at University of Minnesota. She is also a member of the graduate faculty in Ecology, Evolution and Behavior. She is an Affiliate Fellow at the Minnesota Center for Philosophy of Science. She holds a certificate from the National Academies as an education fellow in the Life Sciences, and is currently a member of the Ecological Society of America, American Society of Naturalists, Society for Mathematical Biology, and the International Society of Behavioral Ecology.

Shaw's dissertation (titled Modeling Motives of Movement) was written with the intention of examining migration as an adaptive practice in organisms, and attempting to gain an understanding of the conditions favoring migration, spanning taxonomic boundaries. Shaw continues this same type of research at the University of Minnesota. Shaw researches what ecological factors drive changes in dispersal, and how changes in dispersal affect ecological aspects. In addition to ecological factors, Shaw has researched how environmental changes affect selective pressures of migration.

Awarded the early career fellowship from ESA in 2018 for her "innovative contributions to the fields of ecology, evolution, and behavior through the development of cutting-edge modeling approaches to answer general questions about dispersal, animal migration, disease ecology, conservation, and invasion biology', Shaw continues to study the drivers of movement of individuals, species, and communities.

== Honors, awards, and fellowships ==
- 2018: Early Career Fellow of the Ecological Society of America
- 2016 Outstanding Postdoctoral Mentor Award from the University of Minnesota Postdoctoral Association
- 2014 MCED (Modelling Complex Ecological Dynamics) Award for Innovative Contributions to Ecological Modelling
- 2012–2014 NSF International Research Postdoctoral Fellow
- 2009–2012 NSF Graduate Research Fellow
- 2007–2008 First Year Fellowship in Science and Engineering, Princeton University
- 2006–2007 Fulbright Research Fellow

== Publications ==
- Shaw AK, Kokko H (2015) "Dispersal evolution in the presence of Allee effects can speed up or slow down invasions." American Naturalist 185(5):631-639.
- Shaw AK, Stanton DE (2012) "Leaks in the pipeline: separating structural inertia from ongoing gender differences in academia." Proceedings of the Royal Society B. 279:3736-3741. -
- Shaw, A. K., & Levin, S. A. (2011). To breed or not to breed: a model of partial migration. Oikos, 120(12), 1871–1879.
- Miller TEX, Shaw AK, Inouye BD, Neubert MG (2011) "Sex-biased dispersal and the speed of two-sex invasions." American Naturalist 177:549-561..
- Shaw, A. K., Halpern, A. L., Beeson, K., Tran, B., Venter, J. C., & Martiny, J. B. (2008). It's all relative: ranking the diversity of aquatic bacterial communities. Environmental microbiology, 10(9), 2200–2210. -
