= Ecosystem-based management =

Environmental management paradigm focusing on entire ecosystems

Ecosystem-based management is an environmental management approach that recognizes the full array of interactions within an ecosystem, including humans, rather than considering single issues, species, or ecosystem services in isolation. It can be applied to studies in the terrestrial and aquatic environments with challenges being attributed to both. In the marine realm, they are highly challenging to quantify due to highly migratory species as well as rapidly changing environmental and anthropogenic factors that can alter the habitat rather quickly. To be able to manage fisheries efficiently and effectively it has become increasingly more pertinent to understand not only the biological aspects of the species being studied, but also the environmental variables they are experiencing. Population abundance and structure, life history traits, competition with other species, where the stock is in the local food web, tidal fluctuations, salinity patterns and anthropogenic influences are among the variables that must be taken into account to fully understand the implementation of a "ecosystem-based management" approach. Interest in ecosystem-based management in the marine realm has developed more recently, in response to increasing recognition of the declining state of fisheries and ocean ecosystems. However, due to a lack of a clear definition and the diversity involved with the environment, the implementation has been lagging. In freshwater lake ecosystems, it has been shown that ecosystem-based habitat management is more effective for enhancing fish populations than management alternatives.

Terrestrial ecosystem-based management (often referred to as ecosystem management) came into its own during the conflicts over endangered species protection (particularly the northern spotted owl), land conservation, and water, grazing and timber rights in the western United States in the 1980s and 1990s.

== History ==
The systemic origins of ecosystem-based management are rooted in the ecosystem management policy applied to the Great Lakes of North America in the late 1970s. The legislation created, the "Great Lakes Basin and the Great Lakes Water Quality Agreement of 1978", was based on the claim that "no park is an island", with the purpose to show how strict protection of the area is not the best method for preservation. This type of management system was however an idea that began long before and evolved through the testing and challenging of common ecosystem management practices.

Before its complete synthesis, the management system's historical development can be traced back to the 1930s. During this time, the scientific communities who studied ecology realized that current approaches to the management of national parks did not provide effective protection of the species within. In 1932, The Ecological Society of America's Committee for the Study of Plant and Animal Communities recognized that US national parks needed to protect all the ecosystems contained within the park in order to create an inclusive and fully functioning sanctuary, and be prepared to handle natural fluctuations in its ecology. Also the committee explained the importance for interagency cooperation and improved public education, as well as challenged the idea that proper park management would "improve" nature. These ideas became the foundation of modern ecosystem-based management.

As the understanding of how to manage ecosystems shifted, new tenets of the management system were produced. Biologists George Wright and Ben Thompson accounted for the size and boundary limitations of parks and contributed to the re-structuring of how park lines were drawn. They explained how large mammals for example could not be supported within the restricted zones of a national park and in order to protect these animals and their ecosystems a new approach would be needed. Other scientists followed suit, but none were successful in establishing a well-defined ecosystem-based management approach.

In 1979, the importance of ecosystem-based management resurfaced in ecology from two biologists: John and Frank Craighead. The Craigheads found that grizzly bears of Yellowstone National Park could not sustain a population if only allowed to live within park boundaries. This reinforced the idea that a broader definition of what defines an ecosystem needed to be created, suggesting that it be based on the biotic requirements of the largest mammal present.

The idea of ecosystem-based management began to catch on and projects throughout American National Parks reflected the idea of protecting an ecosystem in its entirety and not based on legal or ecological restrictions as previously used. Jim Agee and Darryll Johnson published a book-length report on managing ecosystems in 1988 explaining the theoretical framework management. While they did not fully embrace ecosystem-based management by still calling for "ecologically defined boundaries", they stated the importance of "clearly stated management goals, interagency cooperation, monitoring of management results, and leadership at the national policy levels". Most importantly they demanded the recognition of human influence. It was argued that scientists must keep in mind the "complex social context of their work" and always be moving towards "socially desirable conditions". This need to understand the social aspects of scientific management is the fundamental step from ecological management to ecosystem-based management.

Although it continues to become recognized, a debate over ecosystem-based management continues. Grumbine (1994) believes, while the approach has evolved, it has not been fully incorporated into management practices because the most effective forms of it have yet to be seen. He articulates that the current ecological climate calls for the most holistic approach of ecological management. This is in part due to the rapid decline in biodiversity and because of the constant state of flux in societal and political views of nature. Conflicts over public interest and understanding of the natural world have created social and political climates that require interagency cooperation, which stands as a backbone for ecosystem-based management.

== Implementation ==
Because ecosystem-based management is applied to large, diverse areas encompassing an array of interactions between species, ecosystem components, and humans, it is often perceived as a complex process that is difficult to implement. Slocombe (1998b) also noted that in addition, uncertainty is common and predictions are difficult. However, in light of significant ecosystem degradation, there is a need for a holistic approach that combines environmental knowledge and co-ordination with governing agencies to initiate, sustain and enforce habitat and species protection, and include public education and involvement. As a result, ecosystem-based management will likely be increasingly used in the future as a form of environmental management. Some suggestions for implementing ecosystem-based management and what the process may involve are as follows:

=== Goals and objectives ===
Defining clear and concise goals for ecosystem-based management is one of the most important steps in effective ecosystem-based management implementation. Goals must move beyond science-based or science-defined objectives to include social, cultural, economic and environmental importance. Of equal importance is to make sure that the community and stake-holders are involved throughout the entire process. Slocombe (1998a) also stated that a single, end-all goal cannot be the solution, but instead a combination of goals and their relationships with each other should be the focus.

As discussed by Slocombe (1998a), goals should be broadly applicable, measurable and readily observable, and ideally be collectively supported in order to be achievable. The idea is to provide direction for both thinking and action and should try to minimize managing ecosystems in a static state. Goals should also be flexible enough to incorporate a measure of uncertainty and be able to evolve as conditions and knowledge change. This may involve focusing on specific threatening processes, such as habitat loss or introduced invasive species, occurring within an ecosystem. Overall the goals should be integrative, to include the structure, organization and processes of the management of an area. Correct ecosystem-based management should be based in goals that are both "substantive", to explain the aims and importance of protecting an area, and "procedural", to explain how substantive goals will be met.

As described by Tallis et al. (2010), some steps of ecosystem-based management may include:

Scoping

This step involves the acquisition of data and knowledge from various sources in order to provide a thorough understanding of critical ecosystem components. Sources may include literature, informal sources such as aboriginal residents, resource users, and/or environmental experts. Data may also be gained through statistical analyses, simulation models, or conceptual models.

Defining indicators

Ecological indicators are useful for tracking or monitoring an ecosystem's status and can provide feedback on management progress as stressed by Slocombe (1998a). Examples may include the population size of a species or the levels of toxin present in a body of water. Social indicators may also be used such as the number or types of jobs within the environmental sector or the livelihood of specific social groups such as indigenous peoples.

Setting thresholds

Tallis et al. (2010) suggest setting thresholds for each indicator and setting targets that would represent a desired level of health for the ecosystem. Examples may include species composition within an ecosystem or the state of habitat conditions based on local observations or stakeholder interviews. Thresholds can be used to help guide management, particularly for a species by looking at the conservation status criteria established by either state or federal agencies and using models such as the minimum viable population size.

Risk analysis

A range of threats and disturbances, both natural and human, often can affect indicators. Risk is defined as the sensitivity of an indicator to an ecological disturbance. Several models can be used to assess risk such as population viability analysis.

Monitoring

Evaluating the effectiveness of the implemented management strategies is very important in determining how management actions are affecting the ecosystem indicators. Evaluation: This final step involves monitoring and assessing data to see how well the management strategies chosen are performing relative to the initial objectives stated. The use of simulation models or multi-stakeholder groups can help to assess management.

Many of these steps for implementing ecosystem-based management are limited by the governance in place for a region, the data available for assessing ecosystem status and reflecting on the changes occurring, and the time frame in which to operate.

== Challenges ==
Because ecosystems differ greatly and express varying degrees of vulnerability, it is difficult to apply a functional framework that can be universally applied. These outlined steps or components of ecosystem-based management can, for the most part, be applied to multiple situations and are only suggestions for improving or guiding the challenges involved with managing complex issues. Because of the greater amount of influences, impacts, and interactions to account for, problems, obstacles and criticism often arise within ecosystem-based management. There is also a need for more data, spatially and temporally to help management make sound decisions for the sustainability of the stock being studied.

The first commonly defined challenge is the need for meaningful and appropriate management units. Slocombe (1998b) noted that these units must be broad and contain value for people in and outside of the protected area. For example, Aberley (1993) suggests the use of "bioregions" as management units, which can allow peoples involvement with that region to come through. To define management units as inclusive regions rather that exclusive ecological zones would prevent further limitations created by narrow or restricting political and economic policy created from the units. Slocombe (1998b) suggests that better management units should be flexible and build from existing units and that the biggest challenge is creating truly effect units for managers to compare against.

Another issue is in the creation of administrative bodies. They should operate as the essence of ecosystem-based management, working together towards mutually agreed upon goals. Gaps in administration or research, competing objectives or priorities between management agencies and governments due to overlapping jurisdictions, or obscure goals such as sustainability, ecosystem integrity, or biodiversity can often result in fragmented or weak management. In addition, Tallis (2010) stated that limited knowledge of ecosystem components and function and time constraints that can often limit objectives to only those that can be addressed in the short-term.

The most challenging issue facing ecosystem-based management is that there exists little knowledge about the system and its effectiveness. Slocombe (1998b) stated that with limited resources available on how to implement the system it is hard to find support for its use.

Slocombe (1998a) said that criticism of ecosystem-based management include its reliance on analogy and comparisons, too broadly applied frameworks, its overlap with or duplication of other methods such as ecosystem management, environmental management, or integrated ecosystem assessment, its vagueness in concepts and application, and its tendency to ignore historical, evolutionary or individual factors that may heavily influence ecosystem functioning.

Tallis (2010) stated that ecosystem-based management is seen as a critical planning and management framework for conserving or restoring ecosystems though it is still not widely implemented. An ecosystem approach addresses many relationships across spatial, biological, and organizational scales and is a goal-driven approach to restoring and sustaining ecosystems and functions. In addition, ecosystem-based management involves community influence as well as planning and management from local, regional and national government bodies and management agencies. All must be in collaboration in order to develop a desired future of ecosystem conditions, particularly where ecosystems have undergone radical degradation and change. Slocombe (1998b) said that to move forward, ecosystem-based management should be approached through adaptive management, allowing flexibility and inclusiveness to deal with constant environmental, societal, and political change.

== Marine systems ==
Ecosystem-based management of marine environments has begun to move away from the traditional strategies which focus on conservation of single species or single sectors in favor of an integrated approach which considers all key activities, particularly anthropogenic, that affect marine environments. Management must take into account the life history of the fish being studied, its association with the surrounding environment, its place in the food web, where it prefers to reside in the water column, and how it is affected by human pressures. The objective is to ensure sustainable ecosystems, thus protecting the resources and services they provide for future generations.

In recent years there has been increasing recognition of anthropogenic disruption to marine ecosystems resulting from climate change, overfishing, nutrient and chemical pollution from land runoff, coastal development, bycatch, and habitat destruction. The effect of human activity on marine ecosystems has become an important issue because many of the benefits provided to humans by marine ecosystems are declining. These services include the provision of food, fuel, mineral resources, pharmaceuticals, as well as opportunities for recreation, trade, research and education.

Guerry (2005) has identified an urgent need to improve the management of these declining ecosystems, particularly in coastal areas, to ensure sustainability. Human communities depend on marine ecosystems for important resources, but without holistic management, these ecosystems are likely to collapse. Olsson et al. (2008) suggest that the degradation of marine ecosystems is largely the result of poor governance and that new approaches to management are required. The Pew Oceans Commission and the United States Commission on Ocean Policy have indicated the importance of moving from current piecemeal management to a more integrated ecosystem-based approach.

=== Stock assessment ===
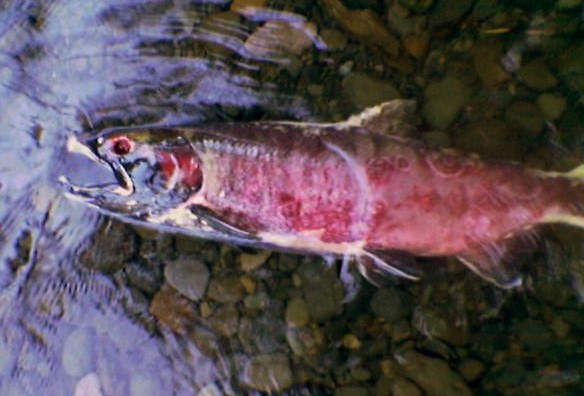
Dead salmon in spawning season

Stock assessment is a critically important aspect of fisheries management, but it is a highly complex, logistically difficult, and expensive process and can thus be a contentious issue, particularly when competing parties disagree on the findings of an assessment. Accurate stock assessments require knowledge of reproductive and morphological patterns, age-at-stage progressions, and movement ecology.

=== Bottom up or top down ===
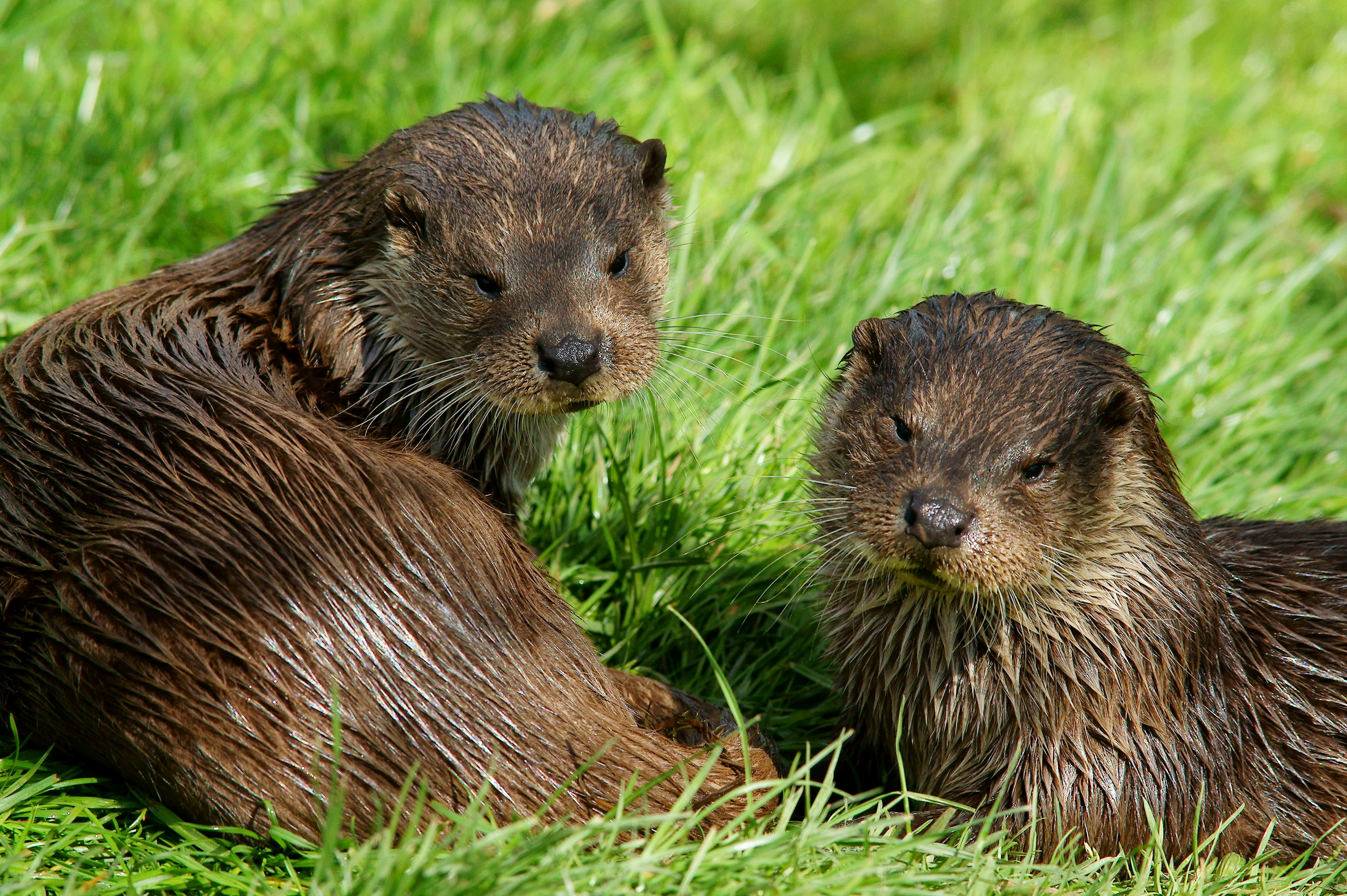
Post-dip pose

All members of an ecosystem are affected by other organisms within that ecosystem, and proper management of wildlife requires knowledge of an organism's trophic level and its effects on other organisms within its food web. Top-down and bottom-up controls represent one method by which the numbers of wild populations of plants and animals are limited. Top-down controls have been seen in the explosion of sea urchins and subsequent decline in kelp beds due to the near-extirpation of sea otters.As otters were hunted nearly to extinction, sea urchins - preyed on by sea otters and which themselves feed on the kelp - boomed, resulting in the near-disappearance of kelp beds. Bottom-up controls are best illustrated when autotrophic primary producers such as plants and phytoplankton, which represent the lowest trophic level of an ecosystem, are limited, impacting all organisms in higher trophic levels, but bottom-up changes can also be seen in higher trophic levels. For example, the decline of North Sea puffins has been attributed to overexploitation of sand eels, an important prey item.

=== Bycatch ===
Red snapper is a species of enormous economic importance in the Gulf of Mexico. Management of this species is complicated by the large impact of bycatch associated with the shrimping industry. Rates of red snapper mortality are not explained by fishery landings, but are instead associated with large numbers of juvenile red snapper caught as bycatch in the fine mesh used by trawlers.

=== Key elements ===
==== Connections ====
At its core, ecosystem-based management is about acknowledging interdependency connections, including the linkages between marine ecosystems and human societies, economies and institutional systems, as well as those among various species within an ecosystem and among ocean places that are linked by the movement of species, materials, and ocean currents. In the Caribbean, the spiny lobster is managed based on a classic population model that for most fishery species works quite well. However, this species will grow and then halt its growth when it need to molt its shell and thus instead of a continuous growth cycle, it will pause its growth and invest its energy in a new shell. It slows this process down as it gets older to invest more energy into reproduction thus further deviating itself from the von Bertalanffy model of growth that was applied to it.

==== Cumulative impacts ====
Ecosystem-based management focuses on how individual actions affect the ecosystem services that flow from coupled socio-ecological systems in an integrated fashion, rather than considering these impacts in a piecemeal manner. Loss of biodiversity in marine ecosystems is an example of how cumulative effects from different sectors can impact on an ecosystem in a compounding way. Overfishing, coastal development, filling and dredging, mining and other human activities all contribute to the loss of biodiversity and therefore degradation of the ecosystem. Work is needed prior to the carrying out of the research to understand the total effects that each species can have on each other and also on the environment. It must be carried out every year as well as species are changing their life history traits and their relationship with the environment as humans are continually modifying the environment.

==== Interactions between sectors ====
The only way to deal with the cumulative effects of human influences on marine ecosystems is for various contributing sectors to set common goals for the protection or management of ecosystems. While some policies may only affect a single sector, others may affect multiple sectors. A policy for the protection of endangered marine species, for example, could affect recreational and commercial fisheries, mining, shipping and tourism sectors to name a few. More effective ecosystem management would result from the collective adoption of policies by all sectors, rather than each sector creating their own isolated policies. For example, in the Gulf of Mexico there are oil rigs, recreational fisheries, commercial fisheries and multiple tourist attractions. One of the main fisheries is that of the Red Snapper which inhabits much of the Gulf and employs thousands of people in the commercial and recreational fishery. During the Deepwater oil spill it became abundantly obvious that it negatively affected the population numbers as well as the integrity of the catch that was being made. The species not only suffered higher mortality rates but the market was less trusting of the product. An environmental disaster interacted with the commercial, recreational, and economic sector for a specific species.

==== Changing public perceptions ====
Not all members of the public will be properly informed, or be fully aware, of current threats to marine ecosystems and it is therefore important to change public perceptions by informing people about these issues. It is important to consider the interest of the public when making decisions about ocean management and not just those who have a material interest because community support is needed by management agencies in order to make decisions. The Great Barrier Reef Marine Park Authority (GBRMPA) faced the issue of poor public awareness in their proposed management strategy which included no-take fishing zones. Olssen (2008) addressed this problem by starting a 'reef under pressure' information campaign to prove to the public that the Great Barrier Reef is under threat from human disturbances, and in doing so were successful in gaining public support.

==== Bridging science and policy ====
To ensure that all key players are on the same page, it is important to have communication between managers, resource users, scientists, government bodies and other stakeholders. Leslie and McLeod (2007) stated that proper engagement between these groups will enable the development of management initiatives that are realistic and enforceable as well as effective for ecosystem management. If certain small-scale players are not involved or informed, it is highly unlikely and equally challenging to get them to cooperate as well as to follow the rules that need to be put in place. It is of the utmost importance to have every stakeholder involved with every step of the process to increase the cohesion of the process.

==== Embracing change ====
Coupled social-ecological systems are constantly changing in ways that cannot be fully predicted or controlled. Understanding the resilience of ecosystems, i.e. the extent to which they can maintain structure, function, and identity in the face of disturbance, can enable better prediction of how ecosystems will respond to both natural and anthropogenic perturbations, and to changes in environmental management. With how much modification humans are doing to environments, it is important to understand these changes on a yearly basis as well. Some species are changing their life histories, Flounder, due to the increased pressures that humans are placing on the environment. Thus, when a manager or government does an assessment on the ecosystem for a given year, the relationship that a species has to others can change very quickly and thus negate the model that you use for an ecosystem very quickly if not redefined.

==== Multiple objectives ====
Ecosystem-based management focuses on the diverse benefits provided by marine systems, rather than on single ecosystem services. Such benefits or services include vibrant commercial and recreational fisheries, biodiversity conservation, renewable energy from wind or waves and coastal protection. The goal is to provide a sustainable fisheries while incorporating the impacts of other aspects on that resource. When managed correctly, an ecosystem-based model can greatly improve not only the resource being managed, but those associated with it.

==== Learning and adaptation ====
Because of the lack of control and predictability of coupled social-ecological systems, an adaptive management approach is recommended. There can be multiple different factors that must be overcome (fisheries, pollution, borders, multiple agencies, etc.) to create a positive outcome. Managers must be able to react and adapt as to limit the variance associated with the outcome.

== Other examples ==
=== Great Bear Rainforest - Canada ===
The Land and Resource Management Planning (LRMP) was implemented by the British Columbia Government (Canada) in the mid-1990s in the Great Bear Rainforest in order to establish a multiparty land-use planning system. The aim was to "maintain the ecological integrity of terrestrial, marine and freshwater ecosystems and achieve high levels of human well-being". The steps described in the programme included: protect old-growth forests, maintain forest structure at the stand level, protect threatened and endangered species and ecosystems, protect wetlands and apply adaptive management. MacKinnon (2008) highlighted that the main limitation of this program was the social and economic aspects related to the lack of orientation to improve human well-being.

=== The Great Lakes - Canada and United States ===
A Remedial Action Plan (RAP) was created during the Great Lakes Water Quality Agreement that implemented ecosystem-based management. The transition, according to the authors, from "a narrow to a broader approach " was not easy because it required the cooperation of both the Canadian and American governments. This meant different cultural, political and regulatory perspectives were involved with regards to the lakes. Hartig et al. (1998) described eight principles required to make the implementation of ecosystem-based management efficacious: "broad-based stakeholder involvement; commitment of top leaders; agreement on information needs and interpretation; action planning within a strategic framework; human resource development; results and indicators to measure progress; systematic review and feedback; and stakeholder satisfaction".

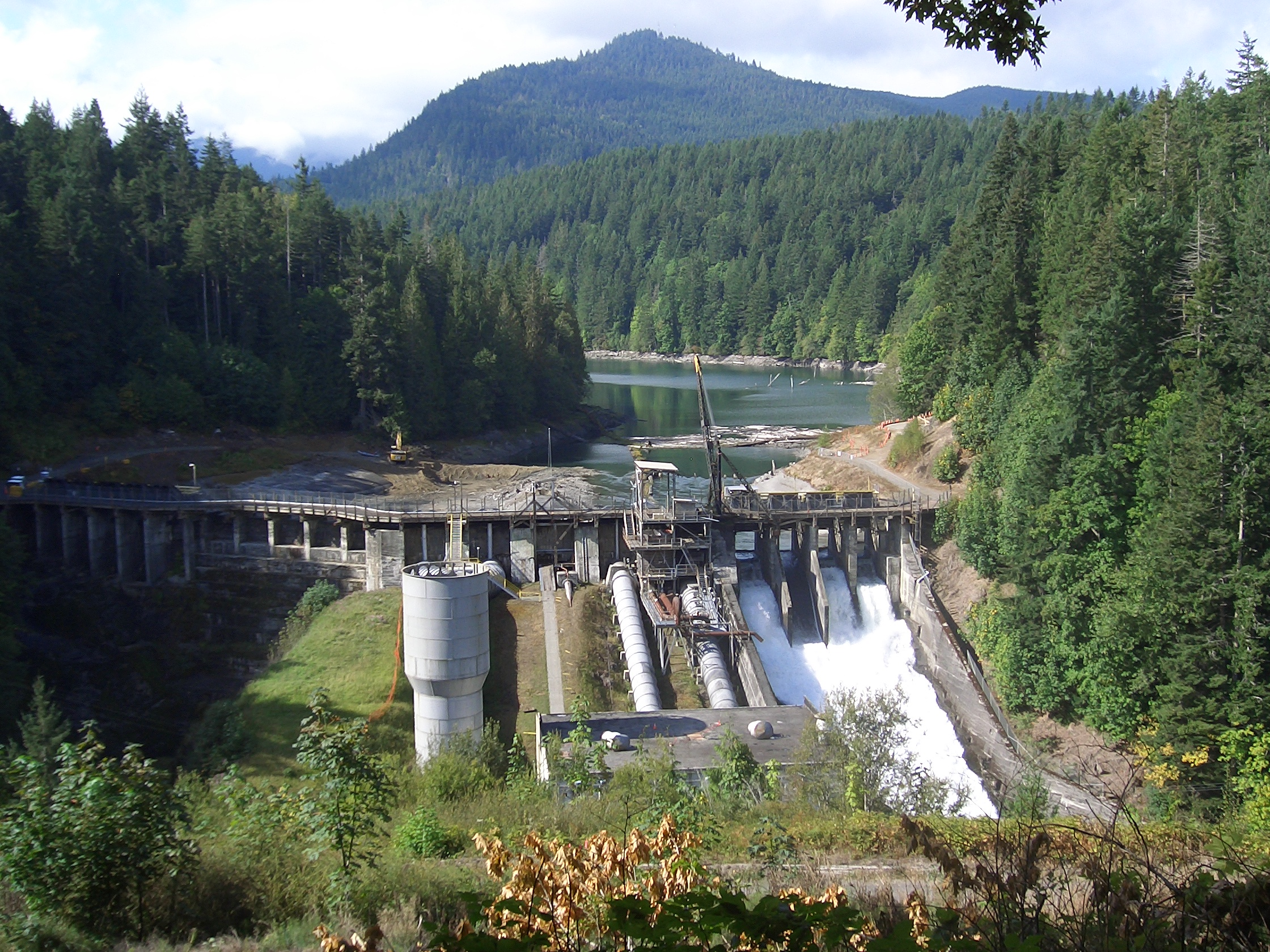
Elwha Dam under deconstruction

=== Dam removal in the Pacific Northwest ===
The Elwha dam removal in Washington state is the largest dam removal project in the United States. Not only was it blocking several species of salmon from reaching their natural habitat, it also had millions of tons of sediment built up behind it.

=== Scallop aquaculture in Sechura Bay, Peru ===
Peruvian Bay Scallop is grown in the benthic environment. Intensity of the fishery has caused concern over recent years and there has been a shift to more of an environmental management scheme. They are now using food web models to assess the current situation and to calibrate the stocking levels that are needed. The impacts of the scallops on the ecosystem and on other species are now being taken into account as to limit phytoplankton blooms, overstocking, diseases and overconsumption in a given year. This study is proposed to help guide both fisherman and managers in their goal of providing long-term success for the fishery as well as the ecosystem they are utilizing.

=== Enhancing lake fish populations - Germany ===
Scientists and numerous angling clubs have collaborated in a large-scale set of whole-lake experiments (20 gravel pit lakes monitored over a period of six years) to assess the outcomes of ecosystem-based habitat enhancement compared to alternative management practices in fisheries. In some of the lakes, additional shallow water zones were created. In other lakes, coarse wood bundles were added to enhance structural diversity. Other study lakes were stocked with five fish species of interest to fisheries. Unmanipulated lakes served as controls to allow for a comprehensive before-after-control-impact study design. The study was based on a sample of more than 150,000 fish. Radinger et al. (2023) found that fish stocking was ineffectual, whereas ecosystem-based habitat management through creating shallow zones increased fish abundance, especially that of juvenile fish. The authors argue that restoring ecological processes and key habitats have a larger potential to meet conservation goals than narrow, species-focused actions.

== See also ==
- Deep ecology
- Ecosystem management
- Ecosystem based fisheries
- Sustainable forest management
- Sustainable land management
- Ecosystem health
- Marine Ecology
