= Carla Staver =

American ecologist

Ann Carla Staver
- Education: University of Cape Town, Princeton University
- Scientific career
- Thesis: Spatial and temporal variability in Acacia population dynamics (2007)

Ann Carla Staver is an American researcher and a professor of Ecology at Princeton University. She is known for her research on the ecology of tropical savannas and forests

== Education and career ==
Staver had her undergraduate education at Columbia University where she obtained a B.A in Ecology, Evolution and Environmental Biology in 2005. She then pursued a Master of Science degree in Botany at the University of Cape Town. She went on to complete her doctoral studies at Princeton University where she was awarded a Ph.D. in Ecology and Environmental Biology in 2012.

Following the completion of her doctoral studies, she became a Prize Postdoctoral Fellow at Columbia University before joining Yale University in 2014 where she was promoted to full professor in 2024. In 2020, she testified to the US House of Representatives Natural Resource Committee. In July 2025 Staver moved to Princeton University.

== Research ==
Staver is a fire ecologist whose research expertise is focused in savanna ecosystems, especially at the boundary between savanna and forest. She uses a combination of empirical and modeling approaches to understand how local interactions of trees with their resource and disturbance environment (usually fire and herbivory) could predict regional and global patterns in tree cover and biome distribution. A portion of her work centers on the concept of tropical forest and savanna bi-stability, the idea that under the same climatic envelope, tropical savannas and forests could exist as alternative stable states maintained by fire-vegetation feedback.

== Awards and honors ==
In 2012 Staver received the George Mercer Award from the Ecological Society of America. The American Society of Naturalists named her the 2013 Jasper Loftus-Hill Young Investigator. In 2016 she was named an Early Career Fellow by the Ecological Society of America.

== Selected publications ==
- Staver, A. Carla; Bond, William J.; Stock, William D.; van Rensburg, Sue J.; Waldram, Matthew S. (2009). "Browsing and fire interact to suppress tree density in an African savanna". Ecological Applications. 19 (7): 1909–1919. doi:10.1890/08-1907.1. ISSN 1051-0761.
- Staver, A. Carla; Archibald, Sally; Levin, Simon A. (2011-10-14). "The Global Extent and Determinants of Savanna and Forest as Alternative Biome States". Science. 334 (6053): 230–232. doi:10.1126/science.1210465. ISSN 0036-8075.
- Staver, A. Carla; Archibald, Sally; Levin, Simon (2011). "Tree cover in sub-Saharan Africa: Rainfall and fire constrain forest and savanna as alternative stable states". Ecology. 92 (5): 1063–1072. doi:10.1890/10-1684.1. ISSN 0012-9658.
- Staver, Ann Carla; Bond, William J. (2014). "Is there a 'browse trap'? Dynamics of herbivore impacts on trees and grasses in an African savanna". Journal of Ecology. 102 (3): 595–602. doi:10.1111/1365-2745.12230. ISSN 0022-0477.
- Staver, A. Carla; Abraham, Joel O.; Hempson, Gareth P.; Karp, A. Tyler; Faith, J. Tyler (2021). "The past, present, and future of herbivore impacts on savanna vegetation". Journal of Ecology. 109 (8): 2804–2822. doi:10.1111/1365-2745.13685. ISSN 0022-0477.
