= Ninney Rise =

Ninney Rise and John Busst Memorial
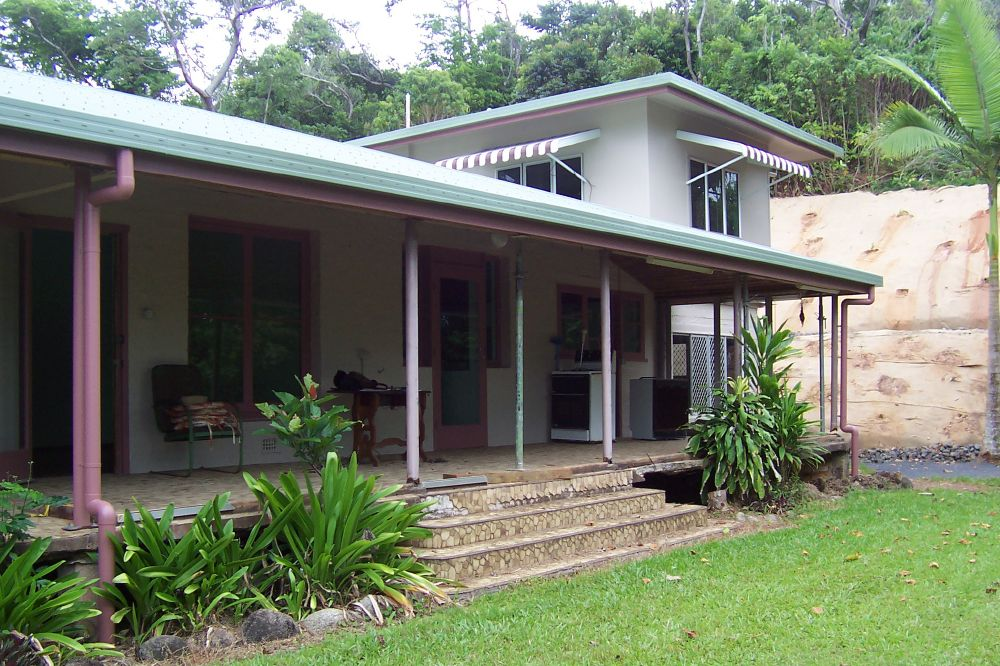
- Ninney Rise, 2003

- Location within Queensland Location within Australia
- 17.8279°S 146.1007°E
- Location: 405 Alexander Drive and Esplanade, Bingil Bay, Cassowary Coast Region, Queensland, Australia

History
- Design period: 1940s – 1960s (post-World War II)
- Built: c.1960

Site notes
- Architect: John Busst

Queensland Heritage Register
- Official name: Ninney Rise and John Busst Memorial, John and Alison Busst's Residence
- Type: state heritage (built)
- Designated: 6 August 2010
- Reference no.: 602499
- Significant period: 1960s onwards
- Builders: John Busst

Ninney Rise and John Busst Memorial are a heritage-listed house and memorial at 405 Alexander Drive and Esplanade, Bingil Bay, Cassowary Coast Region, Queensland, Australia. It was designed by John Busst and built circa 1960 by John Busst. It is also known as John and Alison Busst's Residence. It was added to the Queensland Heritage Register on 6 August 2010.

== History ==
Ninney Rise at Bingil Bay, north of Mission Beach, in northern Queensland was built c. 1960 by artist and environmentalist John Horatio Busst, using locally made bricks and locally sourced bamboo. He lived in the house with his wife Alison until his death in 1971. It was from here that Busst master-minded a passionate, determined and ultimately successful campaign to protect Queensland's Great Barrier Reef and its tropical rainforests from development and mining pressures and exploitation.

Ninney Rise and its grounds are located on what had been part of a 160-acre (65 ha) block first taken up in the name of Sidney B Cutten in 1884. The Cutten family were the area's first non-Indigenous settlers and became well known horticulturists. (They built their family home, Bicton House, on the site now occupied by Ninney Rise, retaining it until the late 1930s).

Mission Beach, Bingil Bay, Dunk and Bedarra Islands remained relatively undeveloped during the first half of the twentieth century, due to their isolation and frequent destructive cyclones. These factors ensured that the area retained much of its outstanding natural beauty which, along with idyllic accounts from Queensland author Edmund James Banfield, attracted artists and naturalists to the area including John Busst and his sister Phyllis, who leased the south-eastern corner of Bedarra Island in 1940 and later purchased almost the whole island (apart from 15 acres (6.1 ha) owned by artist Noel Wood).

John Busst's interest in art, architecture and advocacy began in his youth, which he spent in Victoria. After attending Wesley College, he studied at Melbourne University. He then shared a house with Arthur Munday and future prime minister Harold Holt, before Busst and Munday studied art with draughtsman-turned-painter Justus Jorgensen, who was influential in Melbourne art circles. In 1934 Busst followed Jorgensen to Eltham, an outer suburb of Melbourne, which had attracted artists since the early 1900s, to help build the community of painters, sculptors, musicians and crafts-people later known as Montsalvat. Their architectural vision included the use of natural and local materials, such as pise de terre and mud bricks. As one of Monsalvat's builders, Busst acquired skills in creative and organic building. This artistic background and its associated philosophies influenced Busst's building practices when he moved to north Queensland with his sister in 1940: his first house (since demolished) on Bedarra Island being constructed with hand-made mud bricks.

After 1947 Busst subdivided his Bedarra Island land and sold 86 acres (35 ha). Phyllis returned to Melbourne and John married Alison Shaw Fitchett who joined him on Bedarra in the early 1950s. In 1957 John and Alison Busst sold their home on Bedarra Island and moved to Bingil Bay on just less than 10 acres (4.0 ha) which extended to the beach with views over the Coral Sea and Great Barrier Reef. They also acquired portion 19V to the north, a 154-acre (62 ha) block that included extensive areas of tropical lowland rainforest and the rocky headland known as Ninney Point. In the late 1950s or early 1960s the Bussts erected a new residence on the site.

John Busst designed their new home to be strong enough to withstand cyclones, and utilised locally sourced materials. He employed a local builder to erect the shell of the building using bricks from the Silkwood Brickworks, and then used bamboo, an exotic that had been planted in the district in the nineteenth century, to create decorative ceiling features, architraves and fittings throughout the residence and to make furniture. Patricia Clare, who visited the Busst's new home at Bingil Bay in the 1960s, later wrote:

"The white house stood on its own cliff, the rainforest behind it, and in front the satin shine of blue water stretching away to where the reefs of lime lay hidden. It was the traditional Australian country house, a core of rooms surrounded by wide verandahs, with a roof like a shady hat pulled down over the lot ... Busst had built it ... [as] a fortress, built of brick and reinforced concrete to outlast the cyclones which periodically smashed into this coast... [explaining] ... 'I am not interested in making anything that won't last for a thousand years.' We stepped off the verandah ... into a room with ceiling lined in a sort of bamboo parquetry."

Busst's artistic individualism and interest in the aesthetics of nature and in using nature in art and architecture gradually evolved into an awareness of the ecological reasons for conserving the natural world, and in the 1960s, to environmental activism.

During the late 1950s and 1960s, Queensland's coastal environments were under threat from rapid development stimulated by a boom in resource exploitation. Busst observed large areas of rainforest being felled for sugar and banana cultivation and cattle, with subsequent wet season rain pouring topsoil out into the ocean. This resulted in pesticides, nutrients and phosphates being flushed out to sea and onto the Great Barrier Reef, which was also under pressure from unsustainable fishing practices and infestations of the crown-of-thorns starfish (Acanthaster planci).

Busst was a founding member, Chairman and Secretary of the Committee for the Preservation of Tropical Rainforest. In 1965 he convinced the Australian government to engage rainforest scientists Dr. Leonard Webb and Geoff Tracey to undertake the first systematic vegetation survey of north Queensland's rainforests. The 1966 survey resulted in: the first ever scientific reference to the international significance of Queensland's lowland rainforests; the first proposal for protection of the full range of North Queensland forests; and the first actual protection of lowland tropical Queensland rainforest.

- Australian Rainforests: Webb and Tracey, who stayed with Busst at his Bingil Bay house to do all their work on medicinal drugs from rainforest plants, were pioneers in Australian rainforest ecology and conservation. They promoted the conservation of lowland rainforest through the establishment of national parks and were joined by the Bussts in their campaign.

John Busst's Great Barrier Reef campaign received much publicity and has been well documented in Australian ecology and conservation literature. Following public notice of a cane grower's intention to harvest coral from 84 acres (34 ha) of supposedly dead reef (as a cheap source of agricultural lime) in 1967, Busst lodged an objection and gathered evidence to prove that Ellison Reef was alive. The ensuing battle involved a number of influential environmentalist groups including the: Australian Conservation Foundation, Queensland Wildlife Preservation Society, the Queensland Littoral Society (renamed the Australian Marine Conservation Society), and the Wildlife Conservation Society (US). Busst also circulated an objection (addressed to the minister for mines) to the premier and the ministers for tourism and conservation and the director-general of the Queensland Government Tourist Bureau. He attracted wide press coverage for the case and enlisted the help of his long-time friend Prime Minister Harold Holt who, after being introduced to Bingil Bay by John Busst, built a holiday home nearby. Six months after the hearings in the Innisfail Courthouse, Queensland Mines Minister Ron Camm rejected the mining application. This landmark case set a precedent for not mining the reef, brought the question of exploiting the Reef's resources into the public arena and served as a cornerstone for the conservation movement in Queensland.

Busst's other major battle involved protecting the Great Barrier Reef from oil drilling. By September 1967 the Queensland Government had leased 80,920 square miles (nearly 21 million hectares) of the Great Barrier Reef to companies that intended to drill there for oil. Busst wrote to both Harold Holt and Opposition Leader Gough Whitlam proposing a moratorium on drilling on the reef and their support for a tropical marine science research centre for Townsville. The ensuing campaign was highly political, with Busst and his supporters linking the leases to the Queensland government through the shareholdings in Exoil No Liability held by a number of ministers as well as the Queensland Premier, Joh Bjelke-Petersen. The campaign broadened and pressed for the Australian Government to wrest control of the reef from the state. Despite failing health, Busst worked with trade unions and parliamentarians, notably Senator George Georges, to pressure the Queensland Government and the oil companies. He planned, and widely publicized, the issue of a writ on the Queensland Government on the grounds that it had colluded with business to promote drilling. Public support grew and the "Save the Reef" campaign attracted support from both sides of politics. The campaign became international as Busst dispatched up to 4,000 letters around the globe. In March 1970 an oil tanker ran aground in the Torres Strait and an alarmed federal government upgraded the Inquiry to a Royal Commission into mining in the Great Barrier Reef. In the meantime legislation was drafted for sovereign control over underwater resources on the Continental Shelf.

During these hard-fought campaigns waged during the 1960s to conserve Queensland's Great Barrier Reef and its tropical rainforests, Busst's house at Bingil Bay, Ninney Rise, became a centre for the movement. It hosted a range of influential visitors, including: politicians such as Harold Holt; noteworthy scientists such as marine biologist Dr Don McMichael, Japanese ornithologist Dr Jiro Kikkawa, rainforest ecologists Webb and Tracey, and United States marine collector and littoral zoologist Eddie Hegerl and his dive team; numerous conservation workers; and author Judith Wright. Wright, the inaugural president of the Wildlife Preservation Society of Queensland in 1962, was intimately involved in the activism and documented it in her book The Coral Battleground, which she dedicated to Busst. In a letter to Wisenet in the 1990s Wright described Busst as "the man whose energy and devotion had first sparked off, and largely continued" the fight to save the reef.

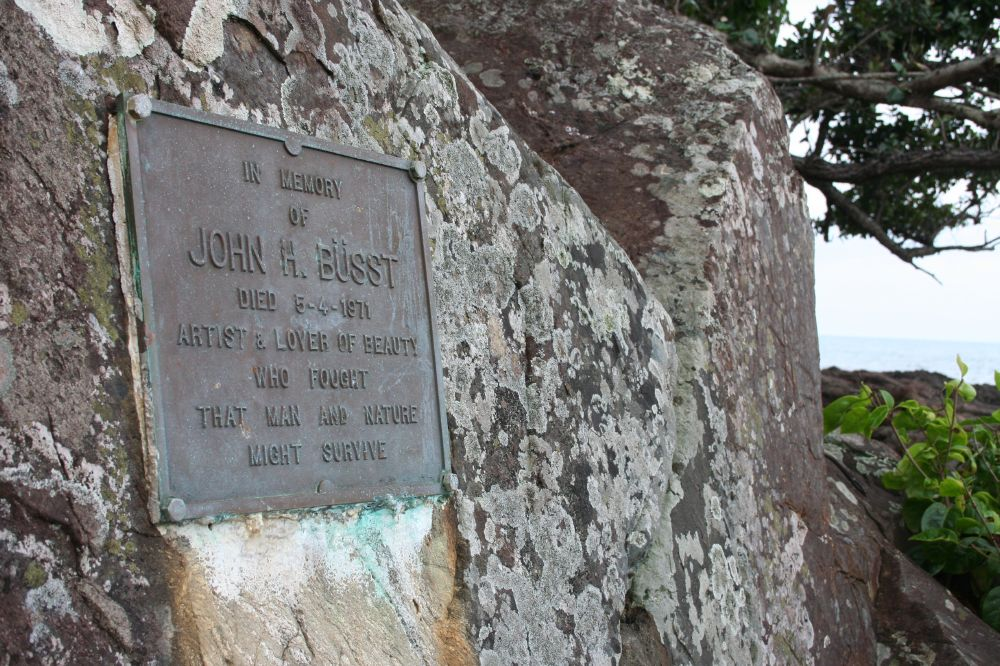
John Busst Memorial, 2008

Busst died in 1971 as he prepared his evidence for the Royal Commission. Wright composed the words for a memorial plaque at Bingil Bay overlooking the ocean just below Ninney Point, to commemorate his passionate commitment to conservation and nature. Four years later the Commonwealth took over management of the Great Barrier Reef with the establishment of the Great Barrier Reef Marine Park Act and the world's largest marine protected area.

Alison Busst subdivided the land around Ninney Rise at Bingil Bay in 1975 and donated the northern rainforest headland around Ninney Point to the State of Queensland as Lot 115 NPW 502. Four years later she sold the house to an American conservationist, Kate Tode.

Kate Tode and friend, Jean Rentoul, moved into Ninney Rise in October 1979. Tode conserved the Bussts' home and built an additional level above the garage at the northern end of the house. During the early 1980s she also arranged for the construction of a tool storage shed and driveway, the installation of a swimming pool, and re-tiled the bathrooms and kitchen. In 1982 Tode excised 3.8 hectares (9.4 acres) of the property, which she donated to the State. This was gazetted as National Park 1828 (now part of the Clump Mountain National Park) on 17 March 1984. At her death on 22 February 1990, Tode bequeathed the remainder of the property (including the house) to the Queensland Parks and Wildlife Service (QPWS). Ninney Rise passed to her executors in late 1993 and was handed over to QPWS in 1995.

In the early 2000s QPWS proposed to sell the property; however conservation groups successfully objected to various Queensland Ministers on the grounds that the place retained significant cultural and natural heritage values. In 2008, QPWS undertook some repairs to the building, mainly the verandah ceilings, floor and foundations. John and Alison Busst's former Bingil Bay residence remains the property of the people of Queensland.

== Description ==
=== Ninney Rise ===
Ninney Rise is located on a 1.98-hectare (4.9-acre) block just south of Ninney Point at Bingil Bay approximately 160 kilometres (99 mi) south of Cairns and 35 kilometres (22 mi) south of Innisfail. The property comprises a main residence, separate garage, and extensive grounds that include indigenous rain forest and a landscaped garden with swimming pool, walkways and driveways. The site is bounded by Clump Mountain National Park to the north, an esplanade and Bingil Bay to the east, and residential properties to the south and west.

The house is accessed via an ascending driveway which winds northward from Alexandra Drive through park-like grounds with some mature trees. Adjacent to the house and covering the northern third of the lot is lush tropical lowland rainforest. The house and grounds, including an in-ground pool at the southern end of the house, are only 20 metres (66 ft) from the foreshore of Bingil Bay, and provide views to the Coral Sea. About 50 metres (160 ft) to the west of the house there is a concrete-block, hipped-roof structure containing garage with work area and water closet. Neither the swimming pool nor the garage is considered to contribute to the cultural heritage significance of the place.

The core of the house is T-shaped in plan and is aligned roughly north-south with the long eastern side facing the ocean.

The house is low-set with a core of load-bearing brickwork walls supporting a concrete ring beam to which the timber-framed roof, clad in metal sheeting, is fixed. The hipped roof extends over the core to form the verandah roof, which is supported by a concrete verandah plate on steel posts fixed to the suspended concrete verandah floor slab. The verandah slab is supported at its edge by concrete piers. At each corner of the verandah a brick supporting walls extends diagonally from the corner of the brick house foundations to the outside edge of the verandah slab. Three sets of concrete steps lead from the verandah to the garden: two on the front (eastern side) and one on the western side. The verandah floor and stairs are finished with tiles and the verandah ceiling is lined with split bamboo.

The walls of the core are of cavity brick, laid on edge in stretcher bond with a header brick every two or three bricks. The brick work pattern is a variation of the Rat-trap or Chinese bond with the bricks laid on edge, and laid with two stretcher bricks then one header brick joining the two skins of the wall together making an approximately 50-millimetre (2.0 in) cavity. The walls are painted on the outside and rendered on the inside. Many of the exterior window and door frames are of painted timber but some have been replaced with aluminium frames and flyscreens.

Midway along the western side of the core a single-storeyed, hipped- roofed wing joins at right angles. This has a skillion extension on the northern side. At the northern end of the core adjoining what was formerly the northern verandah, there is a two-storeyed, hipped roof structure, consisting of a ground floor former garage above which is a later addition.

The layout of the house comprises a living room at the southern end, shaded by verandah on three sides, with glassed doors opening to the verandahs on the east and west and a picture window to the south. A hallway extends north from the living room. Off this hall, facing the sea is a bedroom with an ensuite bathroom, dining room, and kitchen. The dining room and kitchen also have doors opening to the east (front) verandah. The former northern verandah beyond the kitchen is now a breezeway and storage area, and a laundry has been created on the west verandah near the northern corner.

The rear (west) wing is accessed via a short hall at right angles to the main hallway. Opening off this secondary hall is a small bedroom to the south; a bathroom to the north; and a studio or bedroom to the west. This studio/bedroom has an ensuite bathroom accommodated under the skillion-roofed extension. The studio's main light comes from the south. From the secondary hall, between the two bathrooms, there is access to a small porch and beyond this to a brick-enclosed courtyard with an arched entry in the western wall.

With the exception of the kitchen, laundry and bathrooms, rooms have split bamboo ceilings with ceiling lights and fans set in patterned cane or bamboo panels. Architraves and skirtings are also of bamboo, as is the door into the studio. This use of split bamboo is a particularly striking feature of the house. A long strip of what appears to be batik is set into the studio ceiling. The interior timber-framed floor is lined generally with timber boards.

The northern two-storeyed section of the house consists of a large store room and garage on the ground floor with a living area, bedroom and bathroom on the upper level, accessed via an internal timber staircase. It is lined throughout with plasterboard.

=== Busst Memorial ===
The Busst Memorial is located on road reserve just below Ninney Point, close to the beach, approximately 200 metres (660 ft) north of John and Alison Busst's former home, Ninney Rise. It comprises a small brass plaque attached to a natural rock formation, with the plaque facing the ocean. The inscription on the plaque reads:

IN MEMORY Of JOHN H BUSST DIED 5 – 4 – 1971 ARTIST AND LOVER OF BEAUTY WHO FOUGHT THAT MAN AND NATURE MIGHT SURVIVE

== Heritage listing ==
Ninney Rise and John Busst Memorial was listed on the Queensland Heritage Register on 6 August 2010 having satisfied the following criteria.

The place is important in demonstrating the evolution or pattern of Queensland's history.

Ninney Rise is significant as the base from which the artist and environmentalist John Busst organized the "Save the Reef" and other important environmental campaigns during the 1960s and early 1970s. Set within the landscape being fought for, it was a meeting place for the campaigners and scientists involved with him in these efforts and became a focal point for all their struggles. These deeply contentious campaigns were supported by local and international scientists and aimed to protect the Great Barrier Reef and the area's tropical rainforests from development and mining pressures. As influential in the formation of the Great Barrier Reef Marine Park Authority and to the eventual declaration of the Wet Tropics World Heritage Area, these campaigns demonstrate the history of Queensland's environmental conservation movement with Busst's home at Bingil Bay a key place associated with this activism.

The place is important because of its aesthetic significance.

Ninney Rise, its park-like grounds within an area of coastal lowland rainforest and the property's views to the Great Barrier Reef World Heritage Area, have aesthetic significance. The outlook from the place takes in this marine environment, which is now recognised for the natural universal values that John Busst fought to protect during the 1960s before these values had been widely recognised and appreciated.

The place has a special association with the life or work of a particular person, group or organisation of importance in Queensland's history.

A home and a focal point for the early environmental conservation movement in Queensland, Ninney Rise is closely associated with the artist and eco-campaigner John Busst who designed and built it in c. 1960. He worked intimately with the Australian Conservation Foundation, the Queensland Littoral Society (Australian Marine Conservation Society) and the Queensland Wildlife Preservation Society in the campaign to save the Great Barrier Reef. Busst's environmental activism illustrated his transition from being an artist interested in the aesthetics of nature to a conservationist promoting the ecological reasons to conserve the natural environment. The inscription on the memorial to John Busst near Ninney Point reflects his appreciation for art, nature and conservation.
