= John Busst =

Australian artist and conservationist

John Horatio Busst (1909–5 April 1971) was an artist and conservationist in Queensland, Australia. He is best known for leading a successful campaign to protect Queensland's Great Barrier Reef and its tropical rainforests from development, mining pressures and exploitation.

== Early life ==
Busst was born in 1909 in Bendigo, Victoria, the son of Horatio Busst and his wife Emily Kate (née Woodward).

His interest in art, architecture and advocacy began in his youth, which he spent in Victoria. After attending Wesley College, he studied at Melbourne University. He then shared a house with Arthur Munday and future Prime Minister Harold Holt, before Busst and Munday studied art with draughtsman-turned-painter Justus Jorgensen, who was influential in Melbourne art circles. In 1934, Busst followed Jorgensen to Eltham, an outer suburb of Melbourne, which had attracted artists since the early twentieth century, to help build the community of painters, sculptors, musicians and crafts-people, later known as Montsalvat. Their architectural vision included the use of natural and local materials, such as pise de terre and mud bricks. As one of Monsalvat's builders, Busst acquired skills in creative and organic building.

Mission Beach, Bingil Bay, Dunk and Bedarra Islands remained relatively undeveloped during the first half of the twentieth century, due to their isolation and frequent destructive cyclones. Consequently, the area retained much of its outstanding natural beauty which, along with idyllic accounts from Queensland author Edmund James Banfield, attracted artists and naturalists to the area, including John Busst and his sister Phyllis, who leased the south-eastern corner of Bedarra Island in 1940 and later purchased almost the whole island, apart from 15 acres (6 ha) owned by the artist Noel Wood. Busst's artistic background and its associated philosophies influenced his building practices, and his first house (since demolished) on Bedarra Island was constructed with hand-made mud bricks.

After 1947, Busst subdivided his Bedarra Island land and sold 86 acres (35 ha). Phyllis returned to Melbourne and John married Alison Shaw Fitchett, who joined him on Bedarra in the early 1950s. In 1957, John and Alison sold their home on Bedarra Island and moved to Bingil Bay, on a property of just less than 10 acres (4 ha), but which extended to the beach and had views over the Coral Sea and Great Barrier Reef. They also acquired portion 19V to the north, a 154-acre (62 ha) block that included extensive areas of tropical lowland rainforest and the rocky headland known as Ninney Point. In the late 1950s or early 1960s, the Bussts erected a new residence on the site, which they called Ninney Rise.

=== Ninney Rise ===
Busst designed their new home to be strong enough to withstand cyclones, and utilised locally sourced materials. He employed a local builder to erect the shell of the building, using bricks from the Silkwood Brickworks, and then used bamboo, an exotic species that had been planted in the district in the nineteenth century, to create decorative ceiling features, architraves and fittings throughout the residence, and to make furniture. Patricia Clare, who visited the Busst's new home at Bingil Bay in the 1960s, later wrote:

"The white house stood on its own cliff, the rainforest behind it, and in front the satin shine of blue water stretching away to where the reefs of lime lay hidden. It was the traditional Australian country house, a core of rooms surrounded by wide verandahs, with a roof like a shady hat pulled down over the lot ... Busst had built it ... [as] a fortress, built of brick and reinforced concrete to outlast the cyclones which periodically smashed into this coast... [explaining] ... 'I am not interested in making anything that won't last for a thousand years.' We stepped off the verandah ... into a room with ceiling lined in a sort of bamboo parquetry."

Busst's artistic individualism and interest in the aesthetics of nature, and in using nature in art and architecture, gradually evolved into an awareness of the ecological reasons for conserving the natural world and, in the 1960s, to environmental activism.

== Activism ==
=== Development ===
During the late 1950s and 1960s, Queensland's coastal environments were under threat from rapid development stimulated by a boom in resource exploitation. Busst observed large areas of rainforest being felled for sugar and banana cultivation and cattlegrazing, with subsequent wet season rain depositing the topsoil into the ocean. That resulted in pesticides, nutrients and phosphates being flushed out to sea and onto the Great Barrier Reef, which was also under pressure from unsustainable fishing practices and infestations of the crown-of-thorns starfish (Acanthaster planci).

Busst was a founding member, chairman and secretary of the Committee for the Preservation of Tropical Rainforest. In 1965, he convinced the Australian government to engage rainforest scientists Dr. Leonard Webb and Geoff Tracey to undertake the first systematic vegetation survey of north Queensland's rainforests. The 1966 survey resulted in: the first-ever scientific reference to the international significance of Queensland's lowland rainforests, the first proposal for protection of the full range of North Queensland forests, and the first actual protection of lowland tropical Queensland rainforest. Webb and Tracey, who stayed with Busst at his Bingil Bay house to do all their work on medicinal drugs from rainforest plants associated with the Australian Phytochemical Survey, were pioneers in Australian rainforest ecology and conservation. They promoted the conservation of lowland rainforest through the establishment of national parks and were joined by the Bussts in their campaign.

Busst's Great Barrier Reef campaign received a good deal of publicity and has been well documented in Australian ecology and conservation literature. In 1967, following public notice of a cane grower's intention to harvest coral from 84 acres (34 ha) of supposedly dead reef as a cheap source of agricultural lime), Busst lodged an objection and gathered evidence to prove that Ellison Reef was alive. The ensuing battle involved a number of influential environmentalist groups including the: Australian Conservation Foundation, the Queensland Wildlife Preservation Society, the Queensland Littoral Society (renamed the Australian Marine Conservation Society), and the Wildlife Conservation Society (US).

Busst also circulated an objection, addressed to Ernie Evans, the Minister for Mines, to the Premier Frank Nicklin, the Ministers for Tourism and Conservation, and the Director-General of the Queensland Government Tourist Bureau. He attracted wide press coverage for the case and enlisted the help of his long-time friend, Prime Minister Harold Holt, who, after being introduced to Bingil Bay by Busst, built a holiday home nearby. Six months after the hearings in the Innisfail Courthouse, Queensland Mines Minister Ron Camm rejected the mining application. That landmark case set a precedent that the reef should not be mined, brought the question of exploiting the Reef's resources into the public arena, and served as a cornerstone for the conservation movement in Queensland.

=== Oil drilling ===
Busst's other major battle involved protecting the Great Barrier Reef from oil drilling. By September 1967, the Queensland Government had leased 80,920 square miles (209,600 km^{2}) of the Great Barrier Reef to companies that intended to drill for oil. Busst wrote to both Harold Holt and Opposition Leader Gough Whitlam proposing a moratorium on drilling on the reef, and asking for their support for a tropical marine science research centre for Townsville. The ensuing campaign was highly political, with Busst and his supporters linking the leases to the Queensland government through the shareholdings in Exoil No Liability held by a number of Queensland ministers as well as the Queensland Premier, Joh Bjelke-Petersen. The campaign broadened and pressured for the Australian Government to wrest control of the reef from the state.

Despite failing health, Busst worked with trade unions and parliamentarians, notably Senator George Georges, to pressure the Queensland Government and the oil companies. He planned, and widely publicised, the issuing of a writ against the Queensland Government on the grounds that it had colluded with businesses to promote drilling. Public support grew and the "Save the Reef" campaign attracted backing from both sides of politics. The campaign became international when Busst dispatched up to 4,000 letters around the globe. In March 1970, an oil tanker ran aground in the Torres Strait and an alarmed federal government upgraded the inquiry to become the Royal Commission into Exploratory and Production Drilling for Petroleum in the Area of the Great Barrier Reef. In the meantime, legislation was drafted for sovereign control over underwater resources on the continental shelf.

During the campaigns waged in the 1960s to conserve Queensland's Great Barrier Reef and its tropical rainforests, Busst's house at Bingil Bay, Ninney Rise, became a centre for the movement. It hosted a range of influential visitors, including: politicians such as Harold Holt, noteworthy scientists such as marine biologist Dr Don McMichael, Japanese ornithologist Dr Jiro Kikkawa, rainforest ecologists Len Webb and Geoff Tracey, United States marine collector and littoral zoologist Eddie Hegerl and his dive team, numerous conservation workers, and author Judith Wright. Wright, the inaugural president in 1962 of the Wildlife Preservation Society of Queensland, was intimately involved in the activism, and documented it in her book The Coral Battleground, which she dedicated to Busst. In a letter to Wisenet in the 1990s Wright described Busst as "the man whose energy and devotion had first sparked off, and largely continued" the fight to save the reef.

== Death ==
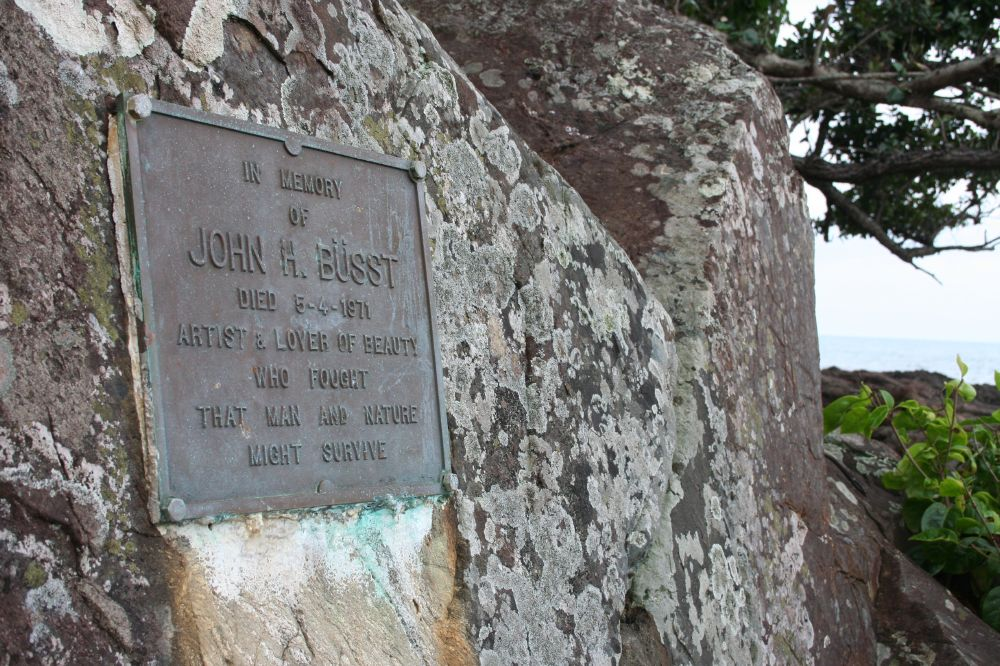
John Busst Memorial, 2008

Busst died on 5 April 1971 at Tully Hospital, as he prepared his evidence for the Royal Commission. Wright composed the words for a memorial plaque, located on road reserve just below Ninney Point, close to the beach, approximately 200m north of their home Ninney Rise. The memorial comprises a small brass plaque attached to a natural rock formation, with the plaque facing the ocean. The inscription on the plaque reads:

IN MEMORY Of JOHN H BUSST DIED 5 - 4 - 1971 ARTIST AND LOVER OF BEAUTY WHO FOUGHT THAT MAN AND NATURE MIGHT SURVIVE

== Legacy ==
Four years after Busst's death the Commonwealth took over management of the Great Barrier Reef with the establishment of the Great Barrier Reef Marine Park Act and the world's largest marine protected area.

Busst's house Ninney Rise, and the Busst Memorial, were added to the Queensland Heritage Register on 6 August 2010.
