= Peter Stanton =

Australian landscape ecologist and biogeographer

Peter Stanton AM PSM
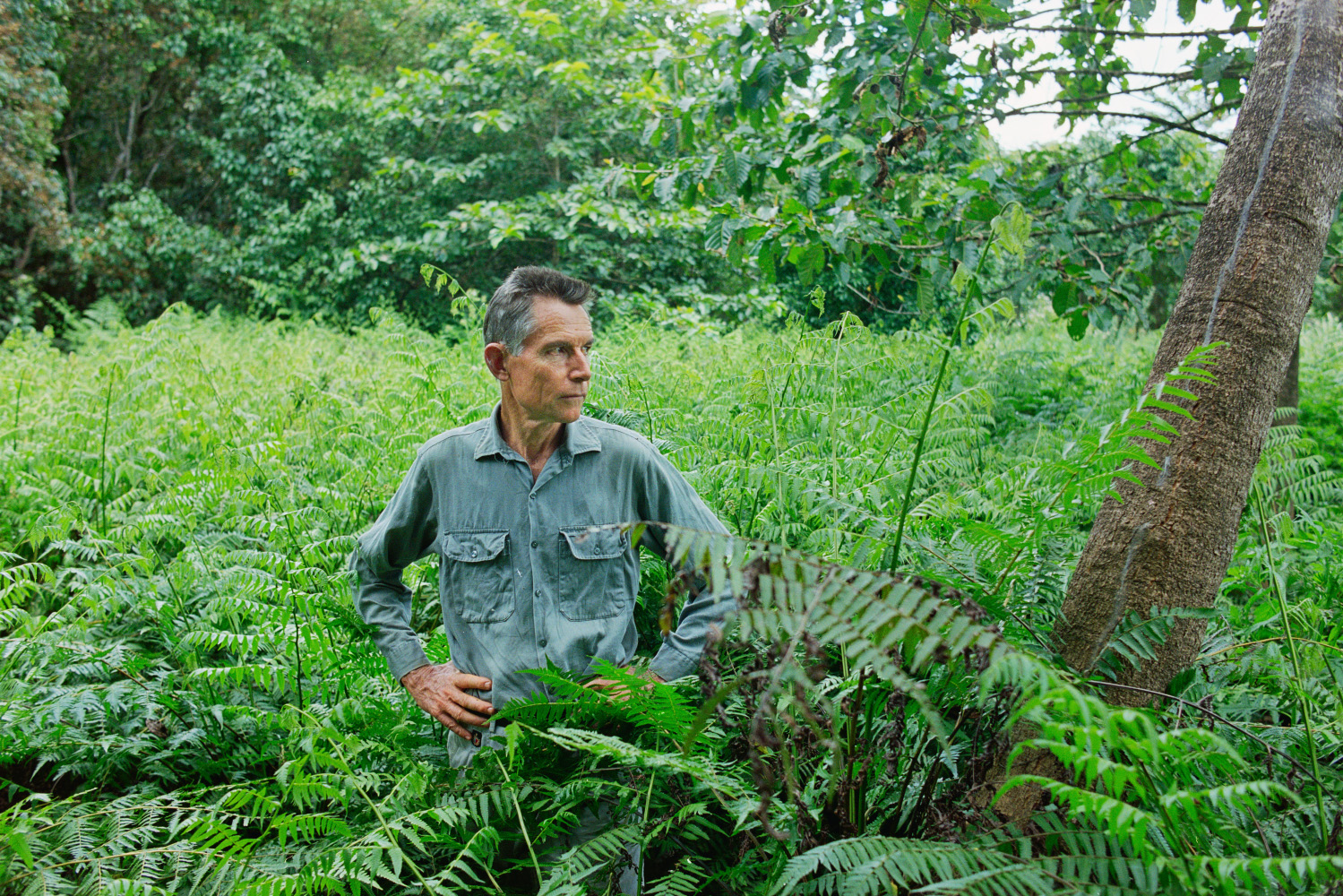
- Stanton in 2004
- Born: James Peter Stanton; 23 April 1940 (age 86); Shorncliffe, Queensland, Australia
- Education: University of Queensland (1962); National Forestry School (1962)
- Known for: National Parks for Cape York Peninsula (1976); Project 'Rakes': a rapid appraisal of key and endangered sites, the Queensland case study (1977); Cape Melville incident (1993–1994); The Rainforests of Cape York Peninsula (1995); The Vegetation of the Wet Tropics of Queensland bioregion (2005)
- Spouse: Karen Stanton
- Awards: Fred M. Packard Award (1982); Public Service Medal (Australia) (1996) for outstanding public service to natural system protection and conservation planning; Centenary Medal (2001) for a long and distinguished public service career contributing to conservation of the Wet Tropics; Cassowary Award (2001) for Science Wet Tropics Management Authority; Doctor of Science (Honoris Causa) (2023) James Cook University In recognition of more than 60 years exceptional service to forest ecology and conservation planning
- Scientific career
- Fields: Rainforest Ecology; Conservation; Fire Ecology
- Workplaces: National Parks Department of Queensland Forestry (1967-1974); Queensland Parks and Wildlife Service (1977-1997); Australian Wildlife Conservancy (2003-Present)

James Peter Stanton AM PSM (born 23 April 1940) is an Australian landscape ecologist, fire ecologist, botanist and biogeographer who individually conducted systematic environmental resource surveys throughout Queensland whilst working for the National Parks department of Forestry (Qld.) from 1967 to 1974. He carried out his assessments in a range of dissimilar landscapes leading to the identification and protection of many critically threatened ecosystems across the state during a period of rapid and widespread land development under the Joh Bjelke-Petersen government. For this work he became the first Australian to receive the IUCN Fred M. Packard Award in 1982.

He was involved in two incidents where implemented or proposed disciplinary actions became prominent controversies. The first began with him standing in the path of bulldozers, the other with ordering that a vehicle and items seized from a smuggler be turned over to the police rather than being handled by higher-ups in his organization.

Since 2003, Stanton has worked with the Australian Wildlife Conservancy as a fire and vegetation ecologist.

== Early life ==
Peter Stanton was born on 23 April 1940 at Shorncliffe, on the northern outskirts of Brisbane. He was educated at Banyo State High School, where he excelled at languages and athletics, and later at the University of Queensland and the Australian Forestry School (Canberra), emerging with a Bachelor of Science in Agriculture and a Diploma in Forestry in 1962.

His formative years in the field of ecology were as a young child, on the mudflats of Shorncliffe and in the bushland of Bribie Island along with his younger brother, John, an actor. Stanton would later describe the sand island landscapes of his childhood around Moreton Bay as "unspoiled paradises of forest, swamp, flowering heath, giant sandhills, and seemingly endless surf and still water beaches" citing the subsequent broad-scale development of many such environments on the South-Eastern coastal fringe of Queensland in the 1960s as an early motivating influence upon his conservation work.

Stanton worked for five years as a forester until, in 1967, he was transferred to the National Parks branch of the Queensland Forestry Department. His transfer was a result of the interest he had shown in National Parks while working in Mackay, and his nomination of and the subsequent gazettal of Cape Upstart (east of Bowen) as a National Park.

== Career ==
In 1973, Stanton undertook a field review of the conservation status of the Wet Tropics area of Queensland spanning two reports which were published by Queensland Forestry in 1974. The reports reinforced and extended the 1965 conservation assessments of Dr. Leonard Webb and Geoff Tracey of CSIRO which had been confined to the lowland areas of the region on account of the extreme development pressures which were placed on the lowlands from the mid-1950s onwards. Stanton's assessments confirmed that "the areas Webb and Tracey had identified were still some of the highest priorities for conservation" whilst also identifying and recommending the protection of a number of additional endangered habitats both within and beyond the lowland areas. The early conservation work conducted in the Wet Tropics by Stanton, along with that of Webb and Tracey, was instrumental to the later protection of many rare and threatened landscapes within the region, including the lowland rainforests of the Daintree and Cape Tribulation area.

In 1980 Stanton was invited to address the second World Wilderness Congress which was held in Cairns, Queensland the same year. His oration ‘The Wilderness of Cape York Peninsula’ was delivered alongside addresses by Bob Brown, Laurens van der Post, Jean Dorst, Ian Player, Madame Laurence de Bonneval, Geoff Mosley and Ray Arnett amongst other delegates representing 25 countries. The congress was to result in the commitment to protect areas of virgin rainforest in Queensland under park status by the premier of the state as well as the recommendation for the inclusion of the Great Barrier Reef on the World Heritage list by then Prime Minister Malcolm Fraser.

From 1977 to 1997, he worked as a senior scientist for the Queensland National Parks and Wildlife Service, relocating from Brisbane to Cairns in 1979 where he remained stationed throughout his career. During this period Stanton produced a body of field research which was to inform and support the listing process of the Wet Tropics of Queensland World Heritage area and its ongoing ecological management. His conservation work in the Wet Tropics and Northern Queensland contributed to Stanton being awarded the Public Service Medal of Australia in 1996 for "outstanding public service to natural system protection and conservation planning" and the Australian Centenary Medal in 2001 for "a long and distinguished public service career contributing to conservation of the Wet Tropics".

From 1992 to 1994, Stanton, accompanied by botanist David Fell, led the first major study of the rainforest ecosystems of the Cape York Peninsula bioregion resulting in the publication of the research report ‘The Rainforests of Cape York Peninsula' in 1995. Taking the form of a systematic ecological survey and mapping project, the study examined the full range of rainforest areas in the region with initial designation on aerial photographs followed by ground-truthing and stratification into 72 separate forest types. 140 sample plots were established encompassing each forest type and within each plot the full range of botanical species was identified and recorded along with the links between each ecosystem and the soils of the sites they occupy. The study also included a review of the conservation status of the various rainforest types, identifying the need for additional reserves, critical management issues and recommended management actions. ‘The Rainforests of Cape York Peninsula' was later republished by The Cooperative Research Centre for Tropical Rainforest Ecology and Management at James Cook University in 2004.

In 2001, Stanton was the recipient of the Australian Wet Tropics Management Authority's ‘Cassowary Award’ for his scientific work and his vegetation mapping of the region which later culminated in the publication of 38 vegetation community maps at 1:50,000 scale entitled "The Vegetation of the Wet Tropics of Queensland bioregion" (J.P. & D.J. Stanton, 2005). The vegetation communities, initially designated within 90,000 polygons across 4,000 aerial photographs were then ground-truthed leading to the identification and description of 250 distinct ecosystem types in the region. The project built upon previous 1:100,000 vegetation mapping (Tracey and Webb 1975) providing finer and more accurate vegetation mapping accompanied by a series of reports describing the main vegetation types of each mapsheet area, their understory types, disturbance histories and their links to the geology of the sites they occupy. In 2023, in conjunction with an Honorary Doctorate in Science which was awarded to Stanton by the James Cook University, the Vegetation of the Wet Tropics of Queensland bioregion was cited as being the most detailed such study in the world.

For his conservation work in the 1960s and 70s he became the first Australian to receive the IUCN Fred M. Packard Award in 1982. Since 2003, Stanton has worked with the Australian Wildlife Conservancy as a fire and vegetation ecologist.

Stanton was appointed a Member of the Order of Australia in the 2026 King's Birthday Honours in recognition of his "significant service to conservation, to wildlife ecology, and to wet tropics management".

== Political controversies ==
During his career within the Queensland National Parks and Wildlife Service Stanton was twice threatened with dismissal by the Queensland Government. In 1983, during the construction of the road through the Cape Tribulation National Park to Bloomfield he was suspended from the position of Regional Director for several months after having stood in the path of bulldozers in order to protect both the lives of protestors and what he considered to be the most significant tracts of rainforest. Due to public outcry as well as threats of broadscale strike among employees of the National Parks and Wildlife Service, Stanton was reinstated to the Regional Directorship at the recommendation of the Public Service Board in 1984 and remained in the position until he returned to full-time scientific field work in 1988.

Later, in 1994, Stanton was recommended for disciplinary action by the State Government after he ordered that a vehicle containing guns and chainsaws which were suspected of being used for the purpose of smuggling the seeds of the threatened Foxtail Palm be sent to the Cooktown Police Station. Stanton had advised Department of Environment and Heritage officer Pat Shears, who had confiscated the vehicle inside the Cape Melville National Park, to leave the matter in the hands of the police rather than immediately inform the DEH head office in Cairns. Stanton did not trust DEH senior management and feared that Shears might become the victim of "political interference". The vehicle was soon discovered to be connected to key political figures within the then Labor Government. The events were to culminate in a political scandal that came to be variously known as the Foxtail Palm Affair or the Cape Melville incident. The disciplinary action which had been recommended for Stanton was eventually abandoned in the face of significant public outcry.

== Selected works ==
- Stanton, J. P. (27 April 1968). "Future national parks, south-east Queensland" – via National Library of Australia.
- Stanton, J. P. (James Peter) (1970), The high rainfall areas of central Queensland: an investigation into the adequacy or otherwise of existing national parks, and some further proposals
- Stanton, J. P. (James Peter) (1971), A study of the coast and adjacent lowlands of Queensland: availability of land for national park purposes, southern section, proposals 1-4
- Stanton, J. P. (James Peter) (1972), A study of the coast and adjacent lowlands of Queensland: availability of land for national park purposes, central section (Shoalwater Bay to Ingham), proposals 5-12
- Stanton, J. P. (James Peter) (1974), A proposed system of national parks for Queensland coastal areas (Bundaberg to the Daintree River)
- Stanton, J. P. (James Peter) (1974), A report on the Daintree River - Cooktown region, Dept.of Forestry
- Lavarack, P. S. (Peter S.); Stanton, J. P. (James Peter), 1940-; Queensland. National Parks and Wildlife Service (1975), National park proposals for Cape York Peninsula, Queensland National Parks and Wildlife Service
- Stanton, J.P. (27 April 1975). "A preliminary assessment of wetlands in Queensland". C.S.I.R.O. Division of Land Use Research, Canberra – via National Library of Australia.
- Stanton, J. P. (James Peter) (1975), A report on Fraser Island: natural history, land use, land classification, and a proposed framework for its management, Fraser Island Defenders Organisation
- Stanton, J. P. (James Peter), 1940-; Australian Conservation Foundation (1976), National Parks for Cape York Peninsula, Australian Conservation Foundation
- Stanton, J. P. (James Peter); Cooloola Committee, Queensland (1976), The conservation of Cooloola, [Cooloola Committee], ISBN 978-0-9597004-0-4
- Stanton, J.P.; Morgan, M.G. (27 April 1977). "Project 'Rakes': a rapid appraisal of key and endangered sites, the Queensland case study". The University of New England (Australia) School of Natural Resources – via National Library of Australia.
- Lavarack, P. S. (Peter S.); Stanton, J. P. (James Peter), 1940- (1976), Vegetation of the Jardine River catchment and adjacent coastal areas, the Royal Society of Queensland
- Queensland Conservation Council; Stanton, J. P. (James Peter); Gordon, Claridge; Davies, Kerry (joint ed.) (1977), 'The future of Moreton Island', Queensland Conservation Council.
- Stanton, J. P. (James Peter); Godwin, M. D (1989), Report on the conservation status of the remaining habitats of the wet tropical lowlands of Queensland, Queensland National Parks and Wildlife Service & Dept. of Environment and Heritage
- Stanton, J.P. (1989). Fire management on National Parks in a range of tropical environments. A manager's perspective - Fire Research in Rural Queensland (éd. B. R. Roberts). University of Southern Queensland. p. 412,415.
- Stanton, J.P. (1992). J. P. Thomson oration: The neglected lands: Recent changes in the ecosystems of Cape York Peninsula and the challenge of their management. Queensland Geographical Society Vol 7. Queensland: Queensland Geographical Society. pp. 1–18.
- Humphries, S.E.; Stanton, J.P. (27 April 1992). "Weed assessment in the wet tropics world heritage area of north Queensland : report to the Wet Tropics Management Agency". S.l. : s.n – via National Library of Australia.
- Stanton, J.P. (27 April 1995). "'A tropical Queensland perspective' - Country in flames : proceedings of the 1994 symposium on biodiversity and fire in North Australia". S.l. : s.n – via National Library of Australia.
- Werren, G. L.; Goosem, S; Tracey, J; Stanton, J.P. (1995), The Australian Wet Tropics: centre of plant diversity ('World Centres of Plant Diversity' Pages 500-506), Oxford Information Press, WWF/ICUN.
- Stanton, J.P.; Fell, D.G. (27 April 1995). "The rainforests of Cape York Peninsula". Brisbane, Qld. : Dept. of Environment and Heritage – via National Library of Australia.
- Stanton, J. P. (James Peter); Teece, R. J; Queensland. Parks and Wildlife Service (1996), Lakefield National Park : resource information and its management implications: a report, Dept. of Environment
- Stanton, J. P. (James Peter); Queensland. Parks and Wildlife Service (1999), Lakefield National Park : past and present management practices and their relationship to its present environmental condition
- Russell-Smith, Jeremy; Stanton, J.P. (27 April 2002). Fire regimes and fire management of rainforest communities across northern Australia - 'Flammable Australia The Fire Regimes and Biodiversity of a Continent' Chapter 14. PP. 329-344. Cambridge, U.K. : Cambridge University Press – via CSIRO.
- Russell-Smith, J.; Stanton, J.P.; Whitehead, P.J.; Edwards, A. (27 April 2004). "Rainforest invasion of eucalypt- dominated woodland savanna, Iron Range, north-eastern Australia: I. Successional processes - 'Journal of Biogeography' 31 p. 1293-1303". Journal of Biogeography. 31 (8): 1293–1303. doi:10.1111/j.1365-2699.2004.01069.x. S2CID 84308940.
- Russell-Smith, J.; Stanton, J.P.; Whitehead, P.J.; Edwards, A. (27 April 2004). "Rainforest invasion of eucalypt- dominated woodland savanna, Iron Range, north-eastern Australia: II. Rates of landscape change - 'Journal of Biogeography' 31 p. 1305-1316". Journal of Biogeography. 31 (8): 1305–1316. doi:10.1111/j.1365-2699.2004.01070.x. S2CID 85034882 – via Wiley.
- Stanton, J.P.; Fell, D.G. (2005). "The rainforests of Cape York Peninsula". Rainforest CRC – via National Library of Australia.
- Stanton, James Peter & David James; Stott, Mike; Parsons, Mark (6 March 2014). "Fire exclusion and the changing landscape of Queensland's Wet Tropics Bioregion 1. The extent and pattern of transition". Australian Forestry. 77: 51–57. Bibcode:2014AuFor..77...51S. doi:10.1080/00049158.2014.881702. S2CID 85235073 – via Taylor & Francis.
- Stanton, James Peter & David James; Stott, Mike; Parsons, Mark (6 March 2014). "Fire exclusion and the changing landscape of Queensland's Wet Tropics Bioregion 2. The dynamics of transition forests and implications for management". Australian Forestry. 77 (1): 58–68. Bibcode:2014AuFor..77...51S. doi:10.1080/00049158.2014.881702. S2CID 85235073 – via Taylor & Francis.
