= Busst =

Busst is a surname. Notable people with the surname include:

- David Busst (born 1967), English footballer and manager
- John Busst (1909–1971), Australian artist and conservationist
