= Richard Zann =

Australian ornithologist

Richard Alexis Zann
- Born: 27 November 1944
- Died: 7 February 2009 (aged 64); Kinglake, Victoria
- Education: University of Queensland
- Known for: Research on the zebra finch
- Awards: D.L. Serventy Medal
- Scientific career
- Fields: Ornithology
- Workplaces: La Trobe University
- Thesis: Ethology of Poëphila grassfinches (Estrildidae) (1972)
- Doctoral advisor: Jiro Kikkawa

Richard Alexis Zann (27 November 1944 – 7 February 2009) was an Australian ornithologist.

== Early life and career ==
Zann was born on 27 November 1944, and grew up in the town of Casino, New South Wales, where he developed a boyhood interest in wildlife. He graduated from the University of New England in 1965, with a First Class Honours degree. He completed his PhD in 1972 at the University of Queensland, studying the behaviour of grassfinches under the supervision of Jiro Kikkawa. He moved to La Trobe University in Melbourne, Victoria in 1972, where he remained until his death in 2009.

The main focus of Zann's ornithological research was the zebra finch. This work was synthesised in the 1996 book Zebra Finch: A Synthesis of Field and Laboratory Studies, which has been described as his magnum opus. Zann was also known for his studies on the island biogeography of the volcanic island of Krakatau, Indonesia. Zann was killed, along with his wife Eileen and daughter Eva, at Kinglake, Victoria in the 2009 Victorian bushfires.

== Honours ==
In 1998, Zann was awarded the D. L. Serventy Medal by the Royal Australasian Ornithologists Union for outstanding published work on birds in the Australasian region. In an obituary published in 2009, colleague Mike Clarke described Zann as "a reserved, humble, self-effacing man with a particularly dry sense of humour, who often made fun of his own shortcomings." In 2010, the scientific journal Emu published a special issue in Zann's memory, dedicated to the zebra finch.
