= Dennis Atkins =

Australian journalist

Dennis Atkins is a journalist based in Brisbane, Australia. Atkins has worked for a number of media outlets, including Melbourne's News-Sun Pictorial and Brisbane's Courier-Mail. He worked in the Canberra press gallery in the 1980s and from 2000 to 2005, the latter period as national political editor for The Courier-Mail. In 1993, as chief media adviser to Labor Party Premier Wayne Goss, Atkins became embroiled in the Cape Melville affair, though a Criminal Justice Commission investigation later cleared him of wrongdoing.

Atkins was national affairs editor at The Courier-Mail until July 2019 and has been a regular panelist on Insiders, a panel discussion program on ABC Television. He is currently a freelance writer and critic based in Brisbane, and co-host of the podcast Two Grumpy Hacks with Malcolm Farr.
