= Geoff Tracey =

Australian rainforest ecologist (1930–2004)

Geoff Tracey AM
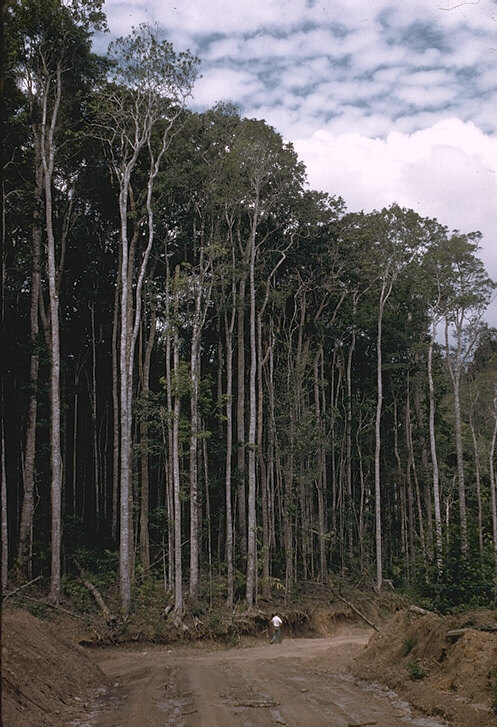
- Tracey on Atherton Tableland. 1954.
- Born: John Geoffrey Tracey; 1930; Cairns, Queensland
- Died: 30 July 2004 (aged 73–74); Yungaburra, Queensland
- Education: Gatton Agricultural College; University of Queensland
- Known for: Australian Phytochemical Survey (1949-1954); CSIRO Rainforest Ecology Research Unit (1954-1980); Vegetation of the Humid Tropical Region of North Queensland (1982); Australian Rainforests: Patterns and Change (1981); A floristic framework of Australian rainforests (1984); Trees for the Evelyn and Atherton Tablelands (1982-2004)
- Spouse: Reinhild Tracey
- Awards: Member of the Order of Australia (AM) for service to conservation and the environment, particularly tropical forest maintenance and planting in North Queensland, through the organisation Trees for the Evelyn and Atherton Tablelands (1996); Cassowary Award (in conjunction with Len Webb) for Science and Conservation. Wet Tropics Management Authority (2000)
- Scientific career
- Fields: Rainforest Ecology; Conservation; Rainforest Regeneration
- Workplaces: CSIRO
- Website: https://www.anbg.gov.au/biography/tracey-geoff.html

John Geoffrey Tracey AM (1930 – 30 July 2004) was an Australian ecologist and botanist. His pioneering research work in partnership with Dr. Leonard Webb AO within the Rainforest Ecology Unit of the CSIRO in the 1950s led to the publication of the first systematic classification of Australian rainforest vegetation in the Journal of Ecology in 1959.

By the early 1980s, Tracey and Webb had accumulated a significant corpus of scientific evidence in support of the theory that Australian tropical rainforests had evolved in Gondwana over 100 million years ago and were not, as previously believed, relatively recent arrivals from South East Asia. This evidence, in combination with Tracey and Webb's 1975 publication of a collection of 15 vegetation maps entitled "Vegetation of the Humid Tropical Region of North Queensland", and Tracey's 1982 paper "The Vegetation of the Humid Tropical Region of North Queensland", helped to establish the scientific basis for a number of major conservation campaigns across Queensland and paved the way for the subsequent successful World Heritage nomination of the Wet Tropics of Queensland by Aila Keto in 1988.

The standard author abbreviation Tracey is used to indicate this person as the author when citing a botanical name.

== Early life ==
Geoff Tracey was born in Cairns in 1930. He was raised, along with his younger brother, by his mother after his father died from Tuberculosis when he was two years old. Tracey was initially educated at Saint Monica's and St Augustine's College in Cairns and spent much of his spare time in his early years fishing and exploring the mudflats, rainforest streams and swamps around the city's fringe.

During World War II Tracey and his family relocated to Laura Station (later to become a part of Rinyirru National Park), near the township of Laura on Cape York where they spent 6 months living with relatives in 1942. His mother had been concerned about the possible threat of a Japanese invasion of Cairns and felt the remote location would offer relative safety for her family. Tracey spent much of his time around the Laura Station exploring the biologically rich natural landscape of the area as well as fishing with an indigenous stockman who was known only to Tracey by his English name ‘Bob Ross’. They had developed a close friendship during Tracey's time on the station with Ross educating him about the landscape and many of the traditional uses of local plants. Tracey was to later cite his time at Laura Station as a formative influence upon his subsequent ecological work.

Tracey's family moved to Brisbane in the mid-40's where he boarded at a Marist Brother's college before enrolling to study agriculture at Gatton Agricultural College from 1947 to 1948 (Tracey later furthered his studies in Botany at the University of Queensland in the early 1960s).

After his graduation from Gatton, Tracey spent a six-week period working for the Queensland Lands Department. He resigned from the position not long after starting on account of his dissatisfaction with the nature of the work which involved monitoring the fulfilment of soldier settlement land clearing conditions after the Second World War.

In December 1949, he took up a position at the CSIRO alongside Dr Leonard Webb as a technical assistant for the research work which Webb was conducting in the search for new plant based drugs as a part of the Australian Phytochemical Survey. A major part of Tracey's work during this period involved collecting samples of plants for testing on request from Webb and other scientists both within Australia and abroad. This work required that he take annual field trips back to the rainforests of North Queensland which were frequently found to contain the broadest range of plants required for sample gathering.

== CSIRO Rainforest Ecology Research Unit ==
In the mid 50's, as CSIRO's interest in phytochemical research waned, Webb, with the direct support of CSIRO head Sir Otto Frankel, made the decision to move into the newly emerging scientific field of Ecology. Based upon the work which they were already conducting within Australian rainforests, funds were apportioned for Webb and Tracey to establish a CSIRO Rainforest Ecology research unit. Their work in the field was to complement the new research being carried out by Alec Costin (Snowy Mountains and Alpine flora) and Milton Moore (the woodlands of Australia) within the ecology section of the CSIRO Division of Plant Industry.

Desmond Herbert, who at the time was Botany Professor at the University of Queensland initially provided a home for the Rainforest Ecology unit within the university's Botany department. A few years later Harry Wharton, a researcher interested in malaria and tropical diseases, offered Webb & Tracey some modern rooms in a new building being built for the division of animal culture laboratory at Long Pocket in Brisbane. Wharton was enthusiastic about the work Tracey and Webb had been doing and required their help in establishing a rainforest on the grounds of Long Pocket to aid his research. The Long Pocket location represented a substantial increase in laboratory space for Webb and Tracey and was to become the home of the CSIRO Rainforest Ecology unit up until its closure in the early 1980s.

The research work conducted by Webb, Tracey and other collaborators within the CSIRO Rainforest Ecology Unit led to the publication of a long series of pioneering research papers in the field, from the first systematic classification of Australian rainforest vegetation in the Journal of Ecology in 1959 to the first major framework for floristic classification of Australian rainforests in 1984 after Webb had retired from CSIRO.

== The vegetation of the humid tropical region of North Queensland ==
In 1980, near the end of his tenure at the CSIRO Long Pocket Laboratories, Tracey completed work on the first major ecological survey of the Wet Tropics of Queensland which was later published by CSIRO in 1982. The 124 page book entitled "The vegetation of the humid tropical region of North Queensland" was to become the primary reference for the ecological description of different rainforest vegetation communities within the region.

The book followed on from Webb and Tracey's initial effort at overall classification of the Wet Tropics rainforest vegetation types in the set of 15 1:100,000 vegetation maps which they produced for publication by CSIRO in 1975. The maps had been produced to provide an ecological background for recent studies of the region by the authors and their collaborators, such as Jiro Kikkawa, W. T. Williams and M. B. Dale and were accompanied by a detailed explanatory key to the different vegetation types.

Tracey's publication adapted the same typological system used for the preceding mapping project whilst providing more detailed descriptions of the different vegetation types and their various ecological relationships. The main rainforest types in North Queensland were classified in relation to rainfall, altitude, soil parent materials and drainage status (as determined by topography and rainfall). The classifications were accompanied by descriptions of the different habitats, their present-day extent and the floristics of a typical reference area (along with details of their variability and disturbance histories).

The study identified 24 broad types of vegetation within the region including 12 major types of rainforest vegetation which Tracey then broke down into 17 distinct sub-types based upon a variety of geological, climactic, floristic and topographic variables. The first book of its kind in Australia, "The vegetation of the humid tropical region of North Queensland" received three separate print runs by CSIRO over the following decade and was to provide the primary scientific basis in support of the subsequent nomination and listing of the Wet Tropics of Queensland World Heritage area in 1988.

== Trees for the Evelyn and Atherton Tablelands ==
In 1982, Tracey and botanist Joan Wright in collaboration with Peter Stanton, Regional Director of the Queensland Parks and Wildlife Service, established Trees for the Evelyn and Atherton Tablelands (TREAT), a community-based rainforest nursery and tree planting organisation based at Lake Eacham National Park with the aim of revegetating degraded lands in order to create corridors for wildlife in Far North Queensland. For this work Tracey was awarded the Member of the Order of Australia in the 1996 Australian Honours ceremony "For service to conservation and the environment, particularly tropical forest maintenance and planting in North Queensland, through the organisation Trees for the Evelyn and Atherton Tablelands (TREAT)"

== Selected works ==
- Webb, L. J.; Tracey, J. G. (1957), Ecological and other evidence for soil inheritance at Childers, S. Qld. Australian Journal of Science 20: 62-63, Australian Journal of Science, hdl:102.100.100/334820
- Webb, L. J.; Tracey, J. G.; Haydock, K.P. (1959), An Australian phytochemical survey. III. Saponins in eastern Australian flowering plants, CSIRO, doi:10.25919/5xj5-7648
- Webb, L. J.; Tracey, J. G.; Haydock, K.P. (1961), The toxicity of Eremophila mitchellii Benth. leaves in relation to the establishment of adjacent herbs. Australian Journal of Science 24: 244-245, Australian Journal of Science, hdl:102.100.100/331573
- Webb, L. J.; Tracey, J. G. (1963), Current quantitative floristic studies in Queensland tropical rain forest - Proceedings UNESCO Symposium on Ecological Research in Humid Tropics Vegetation, Kuching, Sarawak, 1963 pp.257-261, UNESCO, hdl:102.100.100/327324
- Webb, L. J.; Tracey, J. G.; Williams, W. T.; Nance, G. N. (1967), Studies in the Numerical Analysis of Complex Rain-Forest Communities: I. A Comparison of Methods Applicable to Site/Species Data. Journal of Ecology, Vol. 55, No. 1, Mar., 1967, pp. 171-191, Journal of Ecology, British Ecological Society, JSTOR 2257724
- Webb, L. J.; Tracey, J. G. (1967), A factor toxic to seedlings of the same species associated with living roots of the non-gregarious subtropical rain forest tree Grevillea robusta. Journal of Applied Ecology 4: 13-25, Journal of Applied Ecology, hdl:102.100.100/324695
- Webb, L. J.; Tracey, J. G.; Williams, W. T.; Nance, G. N. (1969), Studies in the Numerical Analysis of Complex Rain-Forest Communities: II. The Problem of Species-Sampling. Journal of Ecology, Vol. 55, No. 2, Jul., 1967, pp. 525-538, Journal of Ecology, British Ecological Society, JSTOR 2257891
- Tracey, J. G; Webb, L. J.; Williams, W.T. (1969), Australian flora. The Last of Lands pp. 74-81, Jacaranda Press, hdl:102.100.100/321481
- Williams, W. T.; Nance, G. N.; Webb, L. J.; Tracey, J. G. (1969), Studies in the Numerical Analysis of Complex Rain-Forest Communities: III. The Analysis of Successional Data. Journal of Ecology, Vol. 57, No. 2, Jul., 1969, pp. 515-535, Journal of Ecology, British Ecological Society, JSTOR 2258396
- Williams, W. T.; Nance, G. N.; Webb, L. J.; Tracey, J. G. (1969), Studies in the Numerical Analysis of Complex Rain-Forest Communities: IV. A Method for the Elucidation of Small-Scale Forest Pattern. Journal of Ecology, Vol. 57, No. 3, NOv., 1969, pp. 635-654, Journal of Ecology, British Ecological Society, JSTOR 2258489
- Webb, L. J.; Tracey, J. G.; Williams, W. T.; Nance, G. N. (1969), The pattern of mineral return in leaf litter of three subtropical Australian forests, Journal of Australian Forestry, hdl:102.100.100/320258
- Webb, L. J.; Tracey, J. G.; Williams, W. T.; Nance, G. N. (1970), Studies in the Numerical Analysis of Complex Rain-Forest Communities: V. A Comparison of the Properties of Floristic and Physiognomic-Structural Data. Journal of Ecology, Vol. 58, No. 1, Mar., 1970, pp. 203-232, Journal of Ecology, British Ecological Society, JSTOR 2258177
- Webb, L. J.; Tracey, J. G.; Williams, W. T. (1972), Regeneration and Pattern in the Subtropical Rain Forest." Journal of Ecology, vol. 60, no. 3, pp. 675–695, Journal of Ecology, British Ecological Society, JSTOR 2258559
- Webb, L. J.; Tracey, J. G. (1972), Ecological comparison of vegetation communities on each side of Torres Strait. Bridge and Barrier - the Natural and Cultural History of Torres Strait, D.Walker (ed) (Canberra: Australian National University) BG/3: pp. 109-129, Australian National University, hdl:102.100.100/314211
- Williams, W. T.; Nance, G. N.; Webb, L. J.; Tracey, J. G. (1973), Studies in the Numerical Analysis of Complex Rain-Forest Communities: VI. Models for the Classification of Quantitative Data." Journal of Ecology, vol. 61, no. 1, 1973, pp. 47–70, Journal of Ecology, British Ecological Society, JSTOR 2258916
- Webb, L. J.; Tracey, J. G. (1973), Techniques for selecting and allocating land for nature conservation in Australia. Nature Conservation in the Pacific, Australian National University Press 22: pp. 39-52, hdl:102.100.100/311601
- Tracey, J. G.; Webb, L. J. (1975), Maps of the vegetation of the humid tropic region of North Queensland (maps), CSIRO Division of Plant Industry
- Webb, L. J.; Tracey, J. G.; Williams, W.T. (1976), The value of structural features in tropical forest typology. Australian Journal of Ecology. Vol. 1 pp. 3-28, Australian Journal of Ecology, hdl:102.100.100/304805
- Tracey, J. G.; Webb, L. J. (1978), Vegetation of Hinchinbrook Island, Queensland Naturalist 22: pp. 31-37, hdl:102.100.100/300959
- Webb, L. J.; Tracey, J. G. (1979), An ecological survey of the monsoon forests of the north-western region of the Northern Territory, The Authors
- Webb, L. J.; Tracey, J. G. (1981), Australian Rainforests: Patterns and Change (Ecological Biogeography of Australia, vol. 1 p. 605-694), The Hague: W. Junk, hdl:102.100.100/292256
- Tracey, J. G. (1982), The vegetation of the humid tropical region of North Queensland, Commonwealth Scientific and Industrial Research Organization, ISBN 978-0-643-00424-5
- Webb, L. J.; Tracey, J. G. (1984), The rainforests of northern Australia. In: Australian Vegetation (ed. Groves R.H.), pp. 87 – 130, Cambridge University Press, hdl:102.100.100/292496
- Webb, L. J.; Tracey, J. G.; Williams, W.T. (1984), Floristic framework of Australian rainforests. Australian Journal of Ecology. Vol. 13 pp. 269-276, Australian Journal of Ecology 13:269-276., hdl:102.100.100/277738
- Connell, J.H.; Tracey, J. G.; Webb, L. J. (1984), Compensatory recruitment, growth and mortality as factors maintaining rain forest tree diversity, Ecology Monograph 54 pp. 141-164., hdl:102.100.100/281466
- Webb, L. J.; Tracey, J. G. (1985), Australian tropical forests in a southeast Asian context: a numerical method for site comparison, Proceedings Ecological Society Australia 13:269-276., hdl:102.100.100/277738
- Tracey, J. G. (1986), Trees on the Atherton Tableland : remnants, regrowth and opportunities for planting, Australian National University, Centre for Resource and Environmental Studies, ISBN 978-0-86740-253-7
- Tracey, J. G. (1991), Review of current rehabilitation techniques aimed at revegetation of former mined areas on Christmas Island, Indian Ocean, J.G. Tracey
