= Cape Melville incident =

1993 Queensland, Australia political scandal

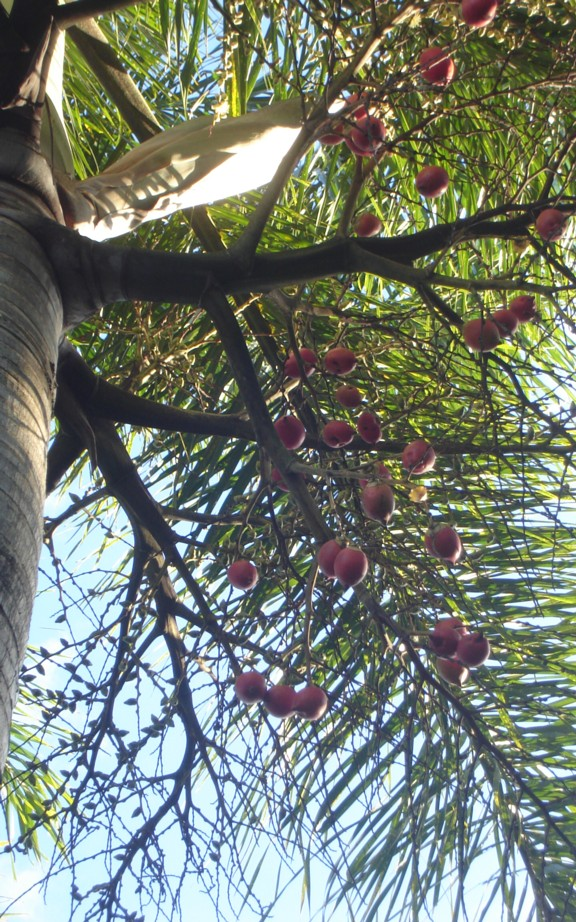
Seeds of the foxtail palm

The Cape Melville incident was a series of events that took place in Cape Melville National Park and Cooktown police station in Queensland, Australia, on 11 November 1993. The incident precipitated a political scandal for the Labor State Government known as the Cape Melville affair or Foxtail palm affair.

== The foxtail palm ==
The foxtail palm (Wodyetia bifurcata) is a tree endemic to the granite boulder fields of the Melville Range, within Cape Melville National Park on Queensland's remote Cape York Peninsula. The tree was unknown beyond the local Aboriginal community until 1978, but its beauty meant it was an instant hit with urban gardeners the world over. By the mid-1980s, illegal harvesting of the plant's seeds for nurseries had become widespread.

Though the palm was not endangered, the smugglers caused significant damage to the area by vandalising park gates, trampling undergrowth, felling whole stands of trees, poaching protected wildlife and depleting natural seed banks.

The Government's position on foxtail palm seed smuggling was unclear. While the police fauna squad and park rangers fought the practice, government agencies such as Southbank Corporation, Cairns Port Authority and TAFE Queensland were among the buyers of the illegally-obtained plants. When 18,000 foxtail palms were seized from Sheldon Palms proprietor David Cochran in 1992, the specimens were hurriedly returned. Cochran's alleged links to the Government and role in smuggling were examined by the State's anti-corruption watchdog, the Criminal Justice Commission (CJC), as part of its Cape Melville incident inquiry in 1994.

== Barbagallo expedition ==
On 10 November 1993, a group of people led by banana farmer Paul Barbagallo and his neighbour, Gordon Uechtritz, camped at Bathurst Bay, near Cape Melville National Park. The following day they drove Barbagallo's Toyota Land Cruiser, laden with automatic rifles and a chainsaw, into the national park. Breaking or circumventing barricades meant to keep vehicles out, they parked near a stand of foxtail palms and set off on foot. Barbagallo was later to admit he had illegally removed seeds from this location on a previous visit, but this time he claimed he was there simply to photograph the palm's habitat.

The park was managed by the State's then Department of Environment and Heritage (DEH). A group of DEH rangers discovered the Land Cruiser's tyre tracks and, knowing smugglers were active in the area, decided to investigate. One of their number, a Vietnam War veteran named Pat Shears, set off on foot while his colleagues remained with their vehicle at the park boundary. Shears discovered the vehicle and determined, based on the location, the rifles and the chainsaw, that it belonged to smugglers. Hearing Barbagallo's party in the distance and fearing they were armed, he drove the Land Cruiser out of the park, secured it at the Rinyirru National Park ranger station, and informed his superior and Cooktown police of the incident. Shears's superior, Peter Stanton, advised Shears to leave the matter in the hands of the police rather than reporting it immediately to the DEH regional office in Cairns. Stanton did not trust DEH senior management and feared Shears might become the victim of "political interference".

== Police interview ==
On 12 November two senior officials from the Queensland Premier's office arrived in Cooktown, one being Barbagallo's brother and Principal Private Secretary to the Premier David Barbagallo, the other being the chief media adviser Dennis Atkins. The reasons for their visit are disputed. The men claimed that the timing was a coincidence: they were going to visit Starcke, a cattle station adjacent to Cape Melville National Park, ahead of a planned visit by Premier Wayne Goss. No evidence to support this claim was provided, and Goss never visited Starcke.

The following morning Atkins, Uechtritz and the brothers Barbagallo went to Cooktown police station. The four men, the police sergeant and Shears met to discuss the incident. Shears claimed the Premier's staffers "grilled" him on his conduct. Ahead of the meeting Atkins telephoned DEH Director-General, Craig Emerson, about the powers of a ranger. Atkins and the brothers Barbagallo then made the six-hour drive to Starcke and, after 20–45 minutes, left the property.

Two weeks later, Shears was dismissed by the DEH. Both Uechtritz and Paul Barbagallo were charged with a number of offences in relation to the incident, though some of the charges against Barbagallo were later withdrawn. Paul Barbagallo was fined a few hundred dollars.

== Political scandal ==
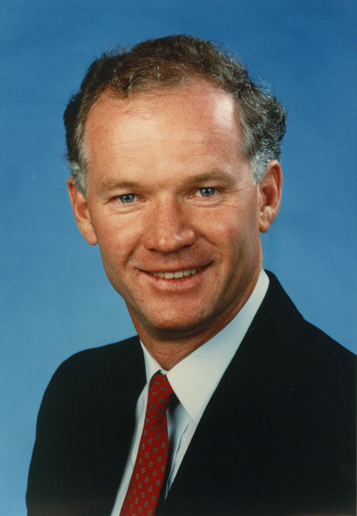
David Barbagallo and Atkins worked in the office of then Premier Wayne Goss.

The story broke in Brisbane's Sunday Mail on 28 November. The National Party opposition, led by Rob Borbidge, questioned why such senior officials had gone to Cooktown to attend the interview, whether improper pressure was placed on public servants, and whether Shears had been dismissed as punishment for upholding the law.

Environment Minister Molly Robson refused to answer questions about the affair in the Legislative Assembly on the grounds that the matter was sub judice. Behind the scenes, her head of media, Barton Green, were leaking material intended to discredit Shears.

== Corruption investigation ==
National Party Environment spokesman Doug Slack called on the CJC to investigate the matter. The Commission announced an inquiry into the incident in March 1994, later expanding this to include allegations that David Barbagallo had also protected Cochran from prosecution.

Although the Commission was generally obliged to hold public hearings, presiding officer Michael Barnes determined that this would be unfair to the participants. The Opposition criticised this decision, noting Barnes's links to the ruling Labor Party and questioning whether his aim was to spare the government embarrassment. Barnes went on to exonerate Emerson, Barbagallo and Atkins.

== Aftermath ==
The Goss Government was defeated in 1996, after which Shears was allowed to work as a ranger once more. Emerson went on to become a minister in the federal Labor Government led by Goss's chief of staff, Kevin Rudd. David Barbagallo became chief of staff to Labor Premier Annastacia Palaszczuk, where he was embroiled in a further scandal involving government investment in a company he part-owns.

Pressure on the foxtail palm eased as the number of specimens in nurseries has increased, meaning that seeds need no longer be smuggled from Cape Melville.
