= Leonard Webb (academic) =

Australian ecologist and ethnobotanist

Len Webb AO
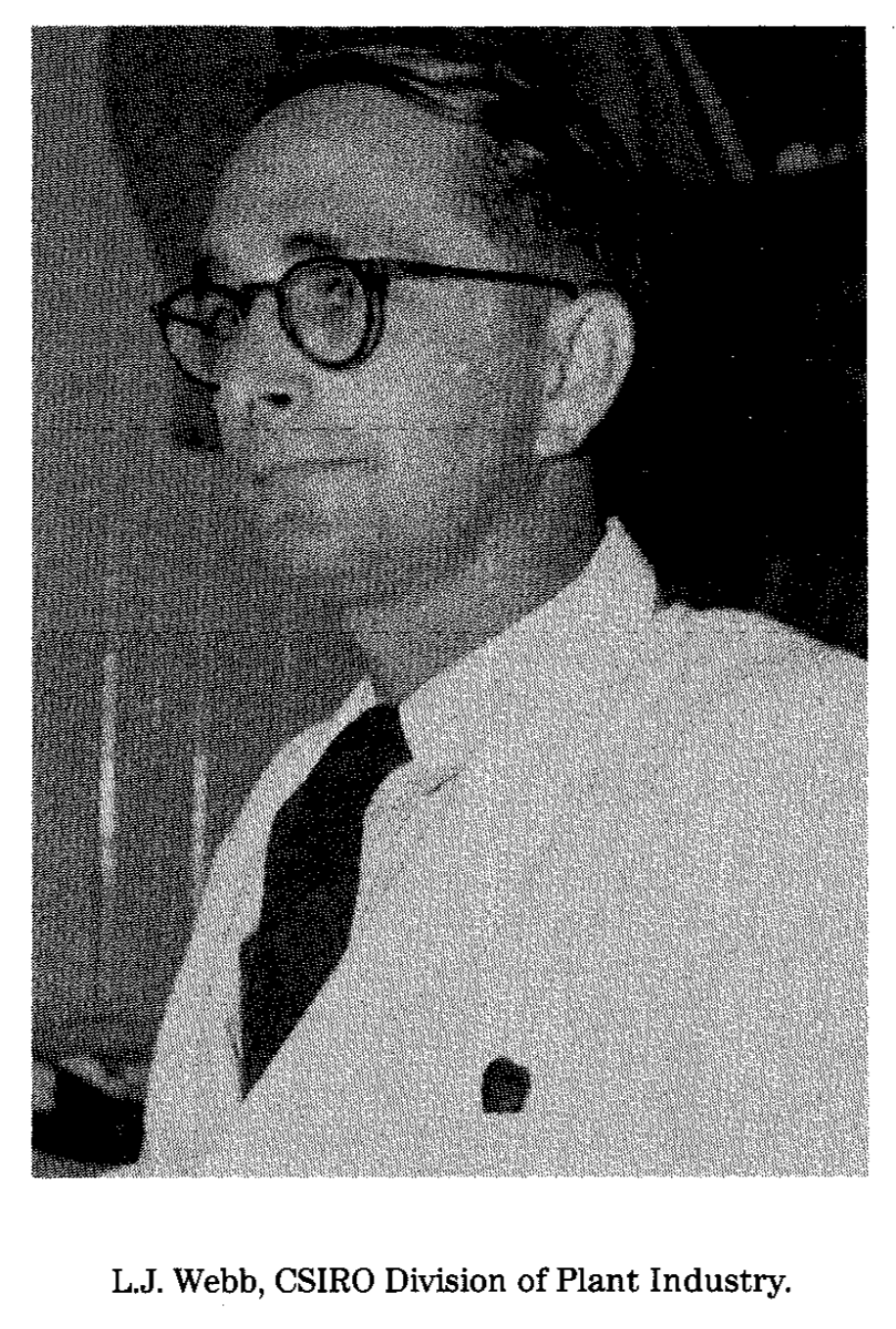
- Webb circa 1950
- Born: Leonard James Webb; 28 October 1920; Rockhampton, Queensland
- Died: 25 November 2008 (aged 88); Queensland
- Education: University of Queensland
- Known for: CSIRO Rainforest Ecology Research Unit (1954-1980); A Physiognomic Classification of Australian Rainforests (1959); The Identification and Conservation of Habitat Types in the Wet Tropical Lowlands of North Queensland (1965; Australian Rainforests: Patterns and Change (1981); A Floristic Framework of Australian Rainforests (1984)
- Spouse: Doris Webb
- Awards: Gold Medal, Ecological Society of Australia (1983); Mueller Medal (1983); BHP Pursuit of Excellence (Environment) Prize (1984); Officer of the Order of Australia (AO) for service to conservation, particularly in the field of rainforest ecology (1987); Doctor of the University, Griffith University (1991); Civilian Service Medal 1939–1945 (1995); Australian Centenary Medal for service to conservation and the environment in Queensland (2001); Cassowary Award (in conjunction with Geoff Tracey) for Science and Conservation. Wet Tropics Management Authority (2000)
- Scientific career
- Fields: Ecology, conservation
- Workplaces: CSIRO; Griffith University
- Thesis: Environmental studies in Australian rainforests (1956)

Leonard James Webb AO (28 October 1920 – 25 November 2008) was a widely awarded Australian ecologist and ethnobotanist who was the author or joint-author of over 112 scientific papers throughout the course of his professional career. His pioneering work as Senior Principal Research Scientist alongside Geoff Tracey in the CSIRO Rainforest Ecology Research Unit in the 1950s led to the publication of the first systematic classification of Australian rainforest vegetation in the Journal of Ecology in 1959.

In the early '80s, after decades of ongoing research, Webb and Tracey had accumulated a large corpus of scientific evidence which confirmed that Australian tropical rainforests had evolved from Gondwana over 100 million years ago and were not, as previously believed, relatively recent arrivals from South East Asia. This discovery served to consolidate the scientific basis for a number of major conservation campaigns across Queensland and paved the way for the subsequent successful World Heritage nomination of the Wet Tropics of Queensland by Aila Keto in 1988.

== Early life ==
Len Webb was born in Rockhampton, Queensland on 28 October 1920. He grew up on a sheep station near Longreach, where his father worked as a horse-breaker and drover and his mother was a station cook. Webb left Rockhampton State High School when he was 15, moving to Brisbane in order to work as junior clerk and typist at the Queensland Herbarium whilst undertaking part-time study in order to complete his matriculation at the Queensland Teachers' College in Brisbane.

He studied at the University of Queensland, gaining a Bachelor of Science (Honours) in 1947, a Masters of Science in 1948 and a Ph.D. in 1956.

Webb worked as a researcher for the CSIRO from the late 1940s, initially as a contributor to the Australian Phytochemical Survey which had commenced in 1946. The survey was a wide-ranging collaboration between the CSIRO and the universities with the aim of identifying alkaloids across a range of Australian ecosystems and plant species for the purpose of discovering new medicinal drugs. Webb's interest in rainforests developed while surveying rainforest plants in North Queensland, often accompanied by Geoff Tracey who had taken on the position of laboratory and field assistant to Webb in December 1949.

== CSIRO Rainforest Ecology Research Unit ==
In 1952, as CSIRO's interest in phytochemical research waned, Webb, with the direct support of CSIRO head Sir Otto Frankel, made the decision to move into the newly emerging scientific field of Ecology. Based upon the work which they were already conducting within Australian rainforests, funds were apportioned for Webb and Tracey to establish a CSIRO Rainforest Ecology research unit which was to complement the new research being carried out by Alec Costin (Snowy Mountains and Alpine flora) and Milton Moore (the woodlands of Australia) within the ecology section of the CSIRO Division of Plant Industry. This was to mark the commencement of a long and groundbreaking ecological research partnership between Webb and Tracey.

Desmond Herbert, who at the time was Botany Professor at the University of Queensland initially provided a home for the Rainforest Ecology unit within the University's Botany department. A few years later Harry Wharton, a researcher interested in malaria and tropical diseases, offered Webb & Tracey some modern rooms in a new building being built for the division of animal culture laboratory at Long Pocket in Brisbane. Wharton was enthusiastic about the work Tracey and Webb had been doing and required their help in establishing a rainforest on the grounds of Long Pocket to aid his research. The Long Pocket location represented a substantial increase in laboratory space for Webb and Tracey and was to become the home of the CSIRO Rainforest Ecology unit up until its closure in the early 1980s.

The research work conducted by Webb, Tracey and other collaborators within the CSIRO Rainforest Ecology Unit led to the publication of a long series of pioneering research papers in the field, from the first systematic structural classification of Australian rainforest vegetation in the Journal of Ecology in 1959 to the first major framework for floristic classification of Australian rainforests in 1984 after Webb had retired from CSIRO.

== The Conservation of the Wet Tropics of Queensland ==
In November 1965 Webb, accompanied by Geoff Tracey, conducted a vegetation survey in the Wet Tropics which resulted in Webb putting forward a series of national park proposals in 1966 for the purpose of protecting the full range of the remaining habitats of the Wet Tropics. Entitled "The Identification and Conservation of Habitat Types in the Wet Tropical Lowlands of North Queensland", Webb's report was the first report of its kind and contained the first reference in scientific literature to the international significance of the lowland rainforests of the Wet Tropics. The proposals in Webb's report were specifically confined to the lowlands because of the extreme development pressures which had been placed on the lowlands from around the mid-1950s onwards.

In 1975, a year after Peter Stanton, of the Queensland National Parks Dept. published an extensive field review of the conservation status of the wet tropics confirming that "the areas Webb and Tracey had identified were still some of the highest priorities for conservation", Webb and Tracey published a collection of 15 vegetation maps entitled "Vegetation of the Humid Tropical Region of North Queensland" which were used extensively in support of a number of major conservation campaigns across Queensland. These events ultimately culminated in many of the areas within Webb's 1966 report, including the Cape Tribulation and Daintree regions, being gazetted as National Parks in 1981.

In the early '80s after decades of ongoing research, Webb and Tracey had accumulated a large corpus of scientific evidence which confirmed that Australian tropical rainforests had evolved from Gondwana over 100 million years ago and were not, as previously believed, relatively recent arrivals from South East Asia. This new understanding of the origins of Australian rainforests in addition to the publication of Geoff Tracey's 1982 paper "The Vegetation of the Humid Tropical Region of North Queensland" significantly contributed to the scientific basis for the subsequent successful World Heritage nomination of the Wet Tropics of Queensland in 1988.

== Awards and honours ==
In 1983 Webb was awarded the Mueller Medal by the Australian and New Zealand Association for the Advancement of Science.

Webb was awarded Officer of the Order of Australia in the 1987 Queen's Birthday Honours Ceremony "For service to conservation, particularly in the field of rainforest ecology" He was also later awarded the Civilian Service Medal 1939–1945 in 1995 and the Australian Centenary Medal in 2001 for "For service to conservation and the environment in Queensland".

== Selected works ==
- Webb, L. J. (Leonard James); Council for Scientific and Industrial Research (Australia) (1948), Guide to the medicinal and poisonous plants of Queensland, Council for Scientific and Industrial Research
- Webb, L. J. (Leonard James) (1950), An Australian phytochemical survey : Alkaloids in Queensland flowering plants, Brisbane
- Webb, L. J. (Leonard James) (1956), Environmental studies in Australian rain forests : parts I-V, Brisbane
- Webb, L. J.; Tracey, J. G. (1957), Ecological and other evidence for soil inheritance at Childers, S. Qld. Australian Journal of Science 20: 62-63, Australian Journal of Science, hdl:102.100.100/334820
- Webb, L. J.; Tracey, J. G.; Haydock, K.P. (1959), An Australian phytochemical survey. III. Saponins in eastern Australian flowering plants, CSIRO, doi:10.25919/5xj5-7648
- Webb, L. J. (Leonard James) (1960), Some new records of medicinal plants used by the Aborigines of tropical Queensland and New Guinea
- Webb, L. J.; Tracey, J. G.; Haydock, K.P. (1961), The toxicity of Eremophila mitchellii Benth. leaves in relation to the establishment of adjacent herbs. Australian Journal of Science 24: 244-245, Australian Journal of Science, hdl:102.100.100/331573
- Webb, L. J.; Tracey, J. G. (1963), Current quantitative floristic studies in Queensland tropical rain forest - Proceedings UNESCO Symposium on Ecological Research in Humid Tropics Vegetation, Kuching, Sarawak, 1963 pp.257-261, UNESCO, hdl:102.100.100/327324
- Webb, L. J. (Leonard James) (1965), An ecological comparison of forest-fringe grassland habitats in eastern Australia and eastern Brazil
- Webb, L. J. (Leonard James); Royal Society of Queensland (1966), The identification and conservation of habitat-types in the wet tropical lowlands of north Queensland, University of Queensland Press for the Royal Society of Queensland
- Webb, L. J.; Tracey, J. G.; Williams, W. T.; Nance, G. N. (1967), Studies in the Numerical Analysis of Complex Rain-Forest Communities: I. A Comparison of Methods Applicable to Site/Species Data. Journal of Ecology, Vol. 55, No. 1, Mar., 1967, pp. 171-191, Journal of Ecology, British Ecological Society, JSTOR 2257724
- Webb, L. J.; Tracey, J. G. (1967), A factor toxic to seedlings of the same species associated with living roots of the non-gregarious subtropical rain forest tree Grevillea robusta. Journal of Applied Ecology 4: 13-25, Journal of Applied Ecology, hdl:102.100.100/324695
- Webb, L. J.; Tracey, J. G.; Williams, W. T.; Nance, G. N. (1969), Studies in the Numerical Analysis of Complex Rain-Forest Communities: II. The Problem of Species-Sampling. Journal of Ecology, Vol. 55, No. 2, Jul., 1967, pp. 525-538, Journal of Ecology, British Ecological Society, JSTOR 2257891
- Webb, L. J. (Leonard James) (1970), Nature protection in Europe, Wildlife Preservation Society of Australia (published 1968), ISBN 978-0-909971-01-4
- Webb, L. J. (Leonard James) (1969), The use of plant medicines and poisons by Australian Aborigines
- Webb, L. J. (Leonard James); Whitelock, Derek, 1934-2015; Webb, L. J. (Leonard James), 1920-2008; Brereton, J. Le Gay (John Le Gay), 1871-1933 (1969), The last of lands, Jacaranda Press, ISBN 978-0-7016-0005-1
- Tracey, J. G; Webb, L. J.; Williams, W.T. (1969), Australian flora. The Last of Lands pp. 74-81, Jacaranda Press, hdl:102.100.100/321481
- Williams, W. T.; Nance, G. N.; Webb, L. J.; Tracey, J. G. (1969), Studies in the Numerical Analysis of Complex Rain-Forest Communities: III. The Analysis of Successional Data. Journal of Ecology, Vol. 57, No. 2, Jul., 1969, pp. 515-535, Journal of Ecology, British Ecological Society, JSTOR 2258396
- Williams, W. T.; Nance, G. N.; Webb, L. J.; Tracey, J. G. (1969), Studies in the Numerical Analysis of Complex Rain-Forest Communities: IV. A Method for the Elucidation of Small-Scale Forest Pattern. Journal of Ecology, Vol. 57, No. 3, NOv., 1969, pp. 635-654, Journal of Ecology, British Ecological Society, JSTOR 2258489
- Webb, L. J.; Tracey, J. G.; Williams, W. T.; Nance, G. N. (1969), The pattern of mineral return in leaf litter of three subtropical Australian forests, Journal of Australian Forestry, hdl:102.100.100/320258
- Webb, L. J.; Tracey, J. G.; Williams, W. T.; Nance, G. N. (1970), Studies in the Numerical Analysis of Complex Rain-Forest Communities: V. A Comparison of the Properties of Floristic and Physiognomic-Structural Data. Journal of Ecology, Vol. 58, No. 1, Mar., 1970, pp. 203-232, Journal of Ecology, British Ecological Society, JSTOR 2258177
- Webb, L. J. (Leonard James), 1920-2008; Tracey, J. G. (John Geoffrey), 1920-2004; Williams, W. T. (1972), Regeneration and Pattern in the Subtropical Rain Forest." Journal of Ecology, vol. 60, no. 3, pp. 675–695, Journal of Ecology, British Ecological Society, JSTOR 2258559
- Webb, L. J.; Tracey, J. G. (1972), Ecological comparison of vegetation communities on each side of Torres Strait. Bridge and Barrier - the Natural and Cultural History of Torres Strait, D.Walker (ed) (Canberra: Australian National University) BG/3: pp. 109-129, Australian National University, hdl:102.100.100/314211
- Williams, W. T.; Nance, G. N.; Webb, L. J.; Tracey, J. G. (1973), Studies in the Numerical Analysis of Complex Rain-Forest Communities: VI. Models for the Classification of Quantitative Data." Journal of Ecology, vol. 61, no. 1, 1973, pp. 47–70, Journal of Ecology, British Ecological Society, JSTOR 2258916
- Webb, L. J.; Tracey, J. G. (1973), Techniques for selecting and allocating land for nature conservation in Australia. Nature Conservation in the Pacific, Australian National University Press 22: pp. 39-52, hdl:102.100.100/311601
- Webb, L. J. (Leonard James) (1973), Environmental boomerang, Jacaranda Press, ISBN 978-0-7016-0587-2
- Webb, L. J. (Leonard James) (1975), Man and environment : conservation of natural resources, Gage Educational Pub.; Ryde [Australia] : Jacaranda Press, ISBN 978-0-7715-7219-7
- Tracey, J. G. (John Geoffrey); Webb, L. J. (Leonard James), 1920-; CSIRO. Division of Plant Industry (1975), Maps of the vegetation of the humid tropic region of North Queensland (maps), Division of Plant Industry
- Tracey, J. G. (John Geoffrey); Webb, L. J. (Leonard James), 1920-2008; CSIRO. Division of Plant Industry (1975), Maps of the vegetation of the humid tropic region of North Queensland (maps), Division of Plant Industry
- Webb, L. J.; Tracey, J. G.; Williams, W.T. (1976), The value of structural features in tropical forest typology. Australian Journal of Ecology. Vol. 1 pp. 3-28, Australian Journal of Ecology, hdl:102.100.100/304805
- Webb, L. J. (Leonard James) (1977), Ethnobotany : the co-operative approach to research
- Webb, L. J. (Leonard James); Papua New Guinea. Office of Environment and Conservation. Department of Natural Resources (1977), Ecological considerations and safeguards in the modern use of tropical lowland rain forests as a source of pulpwood : example, the Madang area PNG, Office of Environment and Conservation, Dept. of Natural Resources
- Tracey, J. G.; Webb, L. J. (1978), Vegetation of Hinchinbrook Island, Queensland Naturalist 22: pp. 31-37, hdl:102.100.100/300959
- Webb, L. J. (Leonard James); Tracey, J. G. (John Geoffrey), 1930- (1979), An ecological survey of the monsoon forests of the north-western region of the Northern Territory, The Authors
- Webb, L. J. (Leonard James), 1920-2008; Tracey, J. G. (John Geoffrey), 1930-2004 (1979), An ecological survey of the monsoon forests of the north-western region of the Northern Territory, The Authors
- Webb, L. J. (Leonard James), 1920-2008; Tracey, J. G. (John Geoffrey), 1920-2004 (1981), Australian Rainforests: Patterns and Change (Ecological Biogeography of Australia, vol. 1 p. 605-694), The Hague: W. Junk, hdl:102.100.100/292256
- Webb, L. J. (Leonard James), 1920-2008; Tracey, J. G. (John Geoffrey), 1920-2004 (1984), The rainforests of northern Australia. In: Australian Vegetation (ed. Groves R.H.), pp. 87 – 130, Cambridge University Press, hdl:102.100.100/292496
- Webb, L. J.; Tracey, J. G.; Williams, W.T. (1984), Floristic framework of Australian rainforests. Australian Journal of Ecology. Vol. 13 pp. 269-276, Australian Journal of Ecology 13:269-276., hdl:102.100.100/277738
- Connell, J.H.; Tracey, J. G.; Webb, L. J. (1984), Compensatory recruitment, growth and mortality as factors maintaining rain forest tree diversity, Ecology Monograph 54 pp. 141-164., hdl:102.100.100/281466
- Webb, L. J.; Tracey, J. G. (1985), Australian tropical forests in a southeast Asian context: a numerical method for site comparison, Proceedings Ecological Society Australia 13:269-276., hdl:102.100.100/277738
- Webb, L. J. (Leonard James); Kikkawa, Jiro, 1929-; Webb, L. J. (Leonard James), 1920-2008; CSIRO; ANZAAS. Congress James Cook University of North Queensland) (57th : 1987; ANZAAS. (57th : 1987 : James Cook University of North Queensland); Webb, L; Kikkawa, J (1990), Australian tropical rainforests : science - values -meaning, CSIRO Australia, ISBN 978-0-643-05055-6
