= Jiro Kikkawa =

Japanese-Australian ornithologist

Professor Jiro Kikkawa (橘川 次郎, Kikkawa Jirō, 15 December 1929 – 30 May 2016) AM was a Japanese Australian ornithologist. His early zoological studies were at Tokyo University, Japan and at Oxford University in England. He subsequently spent three years at the University of Otago in New Zealand where he began what was to become an enduring focus of research, the behavioural ecology of Silvereyes and other species of Zosterops.

== Early life ==
Jiro Kakkawa was born in Japan on 15 December 1929. He studied his BSc at Tokyo University of Fisheries graduating with a degree in marine biology in 1950. He was a Technical Officer in the Ministry of Agriculture and Forestry in Japan from 1950 to 1953. He undertook postgraduate study at the University of Oxford from 1955 to 1956 and was a Teaching Fellow at the University of Otago from 1958 to 1961. He took his DSc in 1961 from Kyoto University.

== Career ==
In 1961 Kikkawa moved to Australia, first to the University of New England at Armidale, and then to the University of Queensland in 1965. He was Head of the Department of Zoology from 1980 to 1988. As well as his studies on white-eyes he is well known for his studies on the biogeography of Australian rainforest birds.

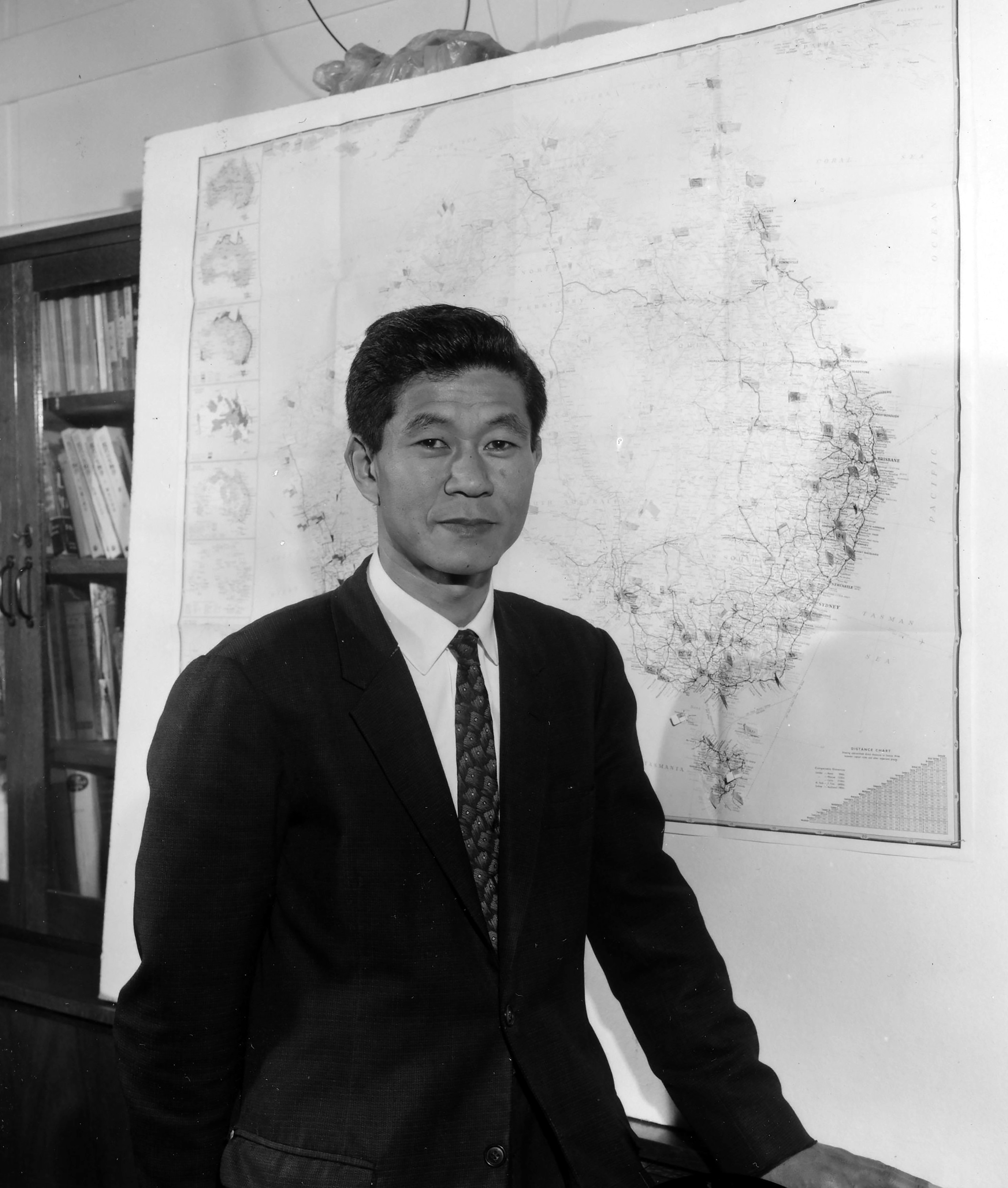
Jiro Kikkawa, photo courtesy of The University of Queensland Archives

After joining the Royal Australasian Ornithologists Union (RAOU) in 1961, Kikkawa served on the RAOU Taxonomic Committee as well as on the editorial board of the RAOU journal Emu. In 1999 he was awarded the D.L. Serventy Medal for outstanding published work on birds in the Australasian region. As well as numerous published scientific papers, he authored and edited several books.

Kikkawa died on 30 May 2016 in Brisbane, Australia.

== Memberships and awards ==
- Queensland Ornithological Society (Birds Queensland) - Founding member
- 1972-1975 President of Queensland Ornithological Society.
- 1974-1976 President of the Ecological Society of Australia
- 1986, Gold Medal, Ecological Society of Australia
- 1999 D.L. Serventy Medal, Birds Australia
- 1999, Member of the Order of Australia

== Legacy ==
The Jiro Kikkawa memorial lecture honours Kikkawa since 2017. In the past grants were given to a researcher whose work best supports and advances bird conservation.

== Selected works ==
- Kikkawa, Jiro, 1929- (1972), Animal behaviour, Jacaranda
- Webb, L. J.; Tracey, J. G.; Kikkawa, J (1973), Techniques for selecting and allocating land for nature conservation in Australia. Nature Conservation in the Pacific, Australian National University, pp. 39–52
- Kikkawa, Jiro, 1929-; Thorne, Malcolm John (1974), The behaviour of animals / Jiro Kikkawa, Malcolm J. Thorne, J. Murray
- Webb, Leonard J; Kikkawa, Jiro, 1929-; CSIRO; ANZAAS. 1987 : James Cook University of North Queensland), Australian tropical rainforests : science - values -meaning / editors: L.J. Webb and J. Kikkawa, CSIRO
- Anderson, D. J. (Derek John), 1935-; Kikkawa, Jiro, 1929- (1986), Community ecology : pattern and process / edited by Jiro Kikkawa, Derek J. Anderson, Blackwell Scientific, ISBN 0867932643
