= Australian Phytochemical Survey =

Collaborative study of native plants

The Australian Phytochemical Survey was a collaborative study of the chemical constituents of native plants in Australia and Papua New Guinea which was conducted by CSIRO as well as chemists within the Australian university system. The project was directed by the then doctoral candidate Len Webb, and was primarily based around a broad search across a range of Australian ecosystems and plant species for new medicinal drugs as well as additional studies on plants which were poisonous to livestock. The survey was active from 1946 until 1974 with pharmacological testing of alkaloids initially being carried out by F.H. Shaw at the University of Melbourne. The Australian Phytochemical Survey later also fostered collaborations with Smith, Kline & French, a pharmaceutical company from Philadelphia as well as National Institutes of Health Clinical Center in Bethesda, Maryland which was established in relation to the screening and study of potential anti-tumour agents arising through the survey.

The survey was initiated as a search for chemical constituents of Australian plants which might hold potential for new drugs or other uses and it became a wide-ranging collaboration between the CSIR (an earlier name for CSIRO) and the universities. The Australian Phytochemical Survey brought critical mass to the study of plant chemistry and was a significant force behind the development of organic chemistry in Australia. By the time of the survey's ultimate conclusion in February 1974 the chemical resources contained in approximately 2,500 Australian species of plant and 2,250 from Papua New Guinea had been investigated with several hundred new alkaloids being isolated and identified along with publication of close to 2,000 research papers on plant constituents by Australian chemists.
