= Unsustainable fishing methods =

Fishing methods with expected lowering of fish population

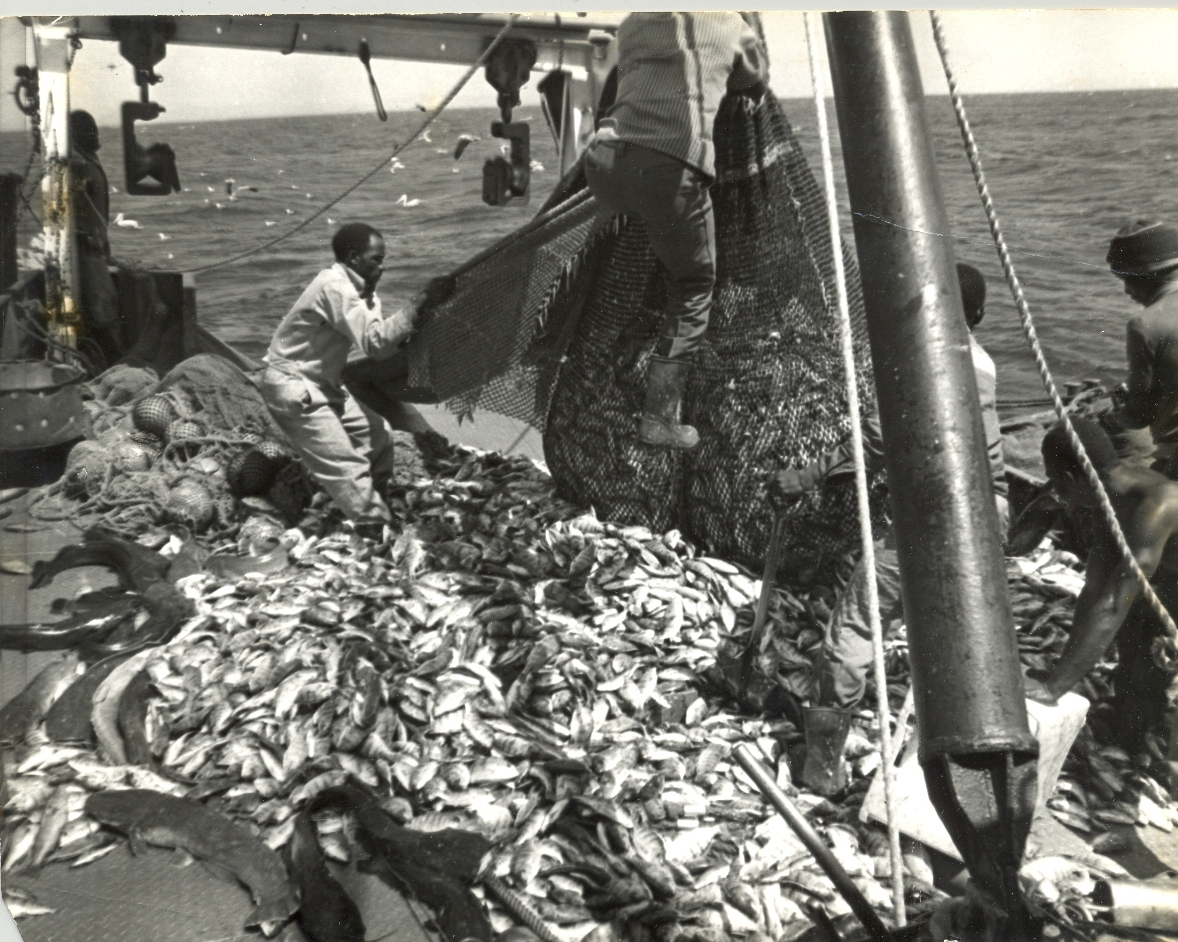
Commercial fishing showing the abundance of fish species caught using a trawling method

Unsustainable fishing methods refers to the use of various fishing methods to capture or harvest fish at a rate that is unsustainable for fish populations. These methods facilitate destructive fishing practices that damage ocean ecosystems, resulting in overfishing.

Unsustainable fishing methods vary in scale, ranging from commercial-grade equipment (such as bottom trawling) to consumer-grade equipment such as fishing rods and nets. These fishing methods become unsustainable through sociological practices such as over-exploitation and overfishing.

== Defining unsustainable ==
Ray Hilborn stated that the unsustainable nature of fisheries can be characterized by three aspects:

- Inconsistent long-term yield refers to the imbalance in nature when fishing is practiced improperly, which results in the inability to capture the maximum sustainable yield at a regular and predictable rate.
- Endangering intergenerational equity relates to the destruction of ecosystems that requires more than one generation to reverse, disallowing future generations the opportunity to capture that same yield.
- Destroying a biological, social, and economic system priorities the health of the human ecosystem or livelihood over that of the ocean's biodiversity, where the depletion of individual stock is carried out until the ecosystem's intrinsic integrity is lost.

== Types of unsustainable fishing methods ==
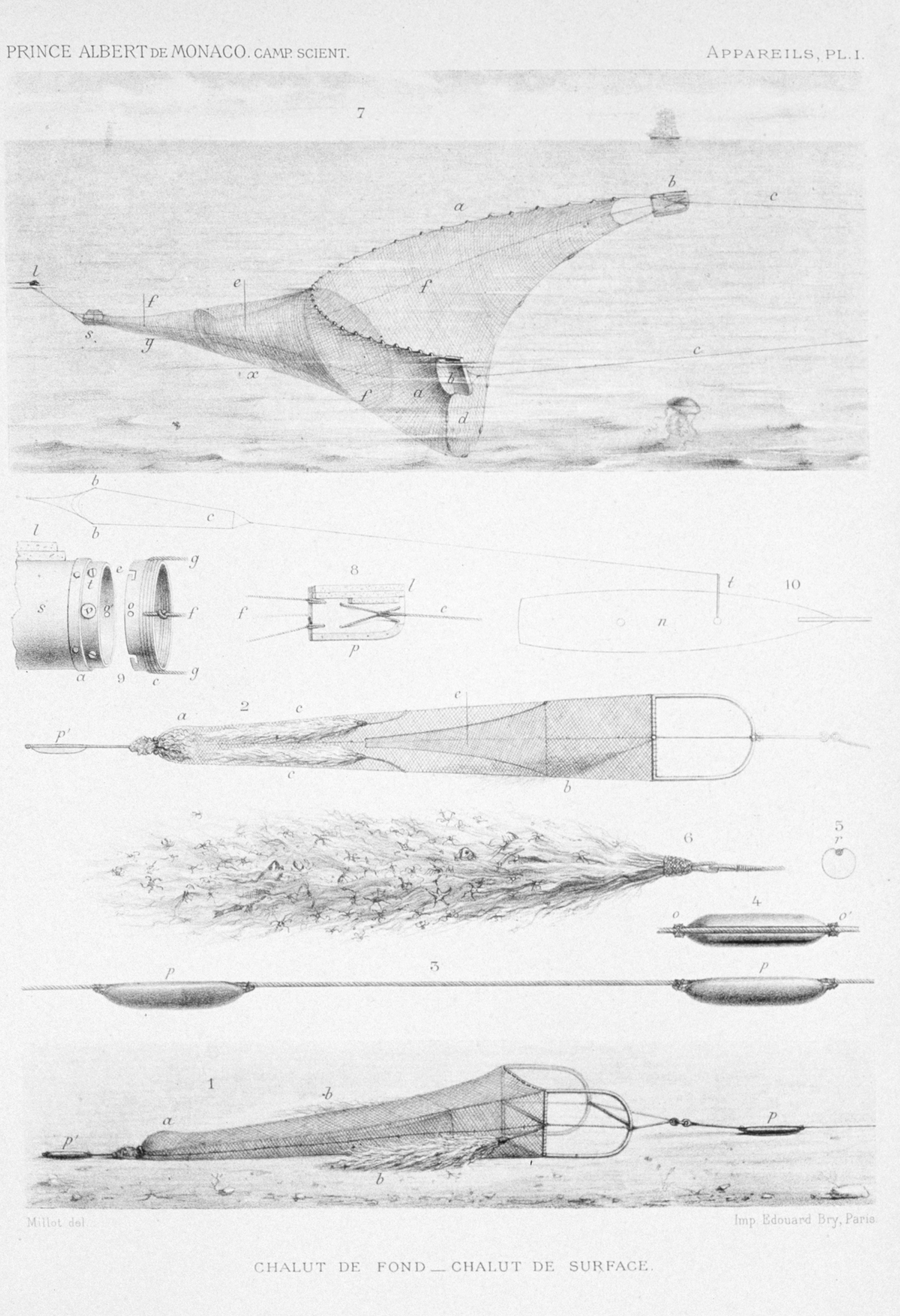
Trawling devices depicted to operate at various ocean depths, showing the vast amount of fish species caught within the "tangles"

=== Bottom trawling ===
Bottom trawling is classified as an active gear that consists of a large weighted net, which trawls or "drags" along the sea floor, acting as a destructive mechanism that removes coral and other marine species. The Sea Fish Industry Authority describes the trawl as consisting of several components that assist the catch composition of the gear:

- The otter boards which herd the fish into the trawl path by dragging up a "sand cloud" that creates a barrier of escape.
- The sweeps and bridles continue to herd the fish further into the trawl.
- The wings and ground gear minimize the potential for fish to escape, which also tires the fish and enables them to drop into the body of the net.

Bottom trawling is scientifically divided into two types of trawling, demersal trawling and benthic trawling, which allows trawlers to target species that live close to the seabed, or those that live on or in the seabed respectively.

=== Cyanide fishing ===
The blast radius of an explosive device being set off underwater to obtain fish (dynamite fishing)

Cyanide fishing is a method to capture live fish for the international aquarium trade and, more recently, to supply restaurant demand for live reef fish. This method involves spraying sodium cyanide into the targeted fish's habitat as a way to stun the fish without killing them. For each fish captured using sodium cyanide, one square meter of coral reef is destroyed.

=== Dynamite fishing ===
Dynamite fishing (also called blast fishing) is a technique that detonates underwater explosives to kill schools of fish and maximize yield. The dead or stunned fish float to the surface of the water where they can be easily harvested. The entire ecosystem, including coral reefs and other marine organisms, can be destroyed if they are within the blast radius. In the case of coral reefs, it may take hundreds of years to rebuild the ecosystem.

=== Ghost fishing ===
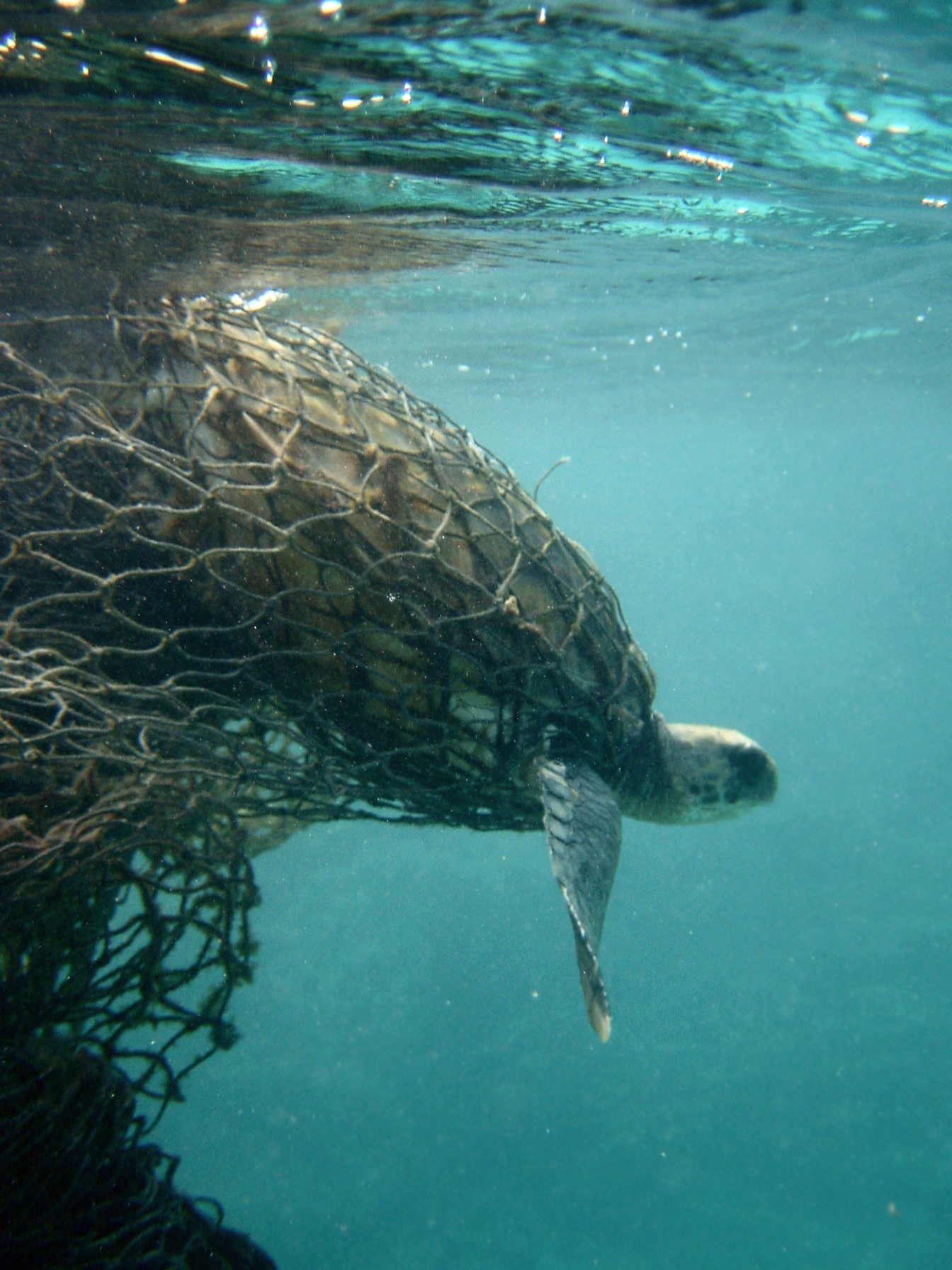
Sea turtle entangled in a ghost net

Ghost gear is fishing gear that has been left or lost in the ocean. The gear can potentially continue to catch or entangle any species of marine life as it drifts through the water or snags on rocky reef, eventually killing the entangled organism through laceration, suffocation or starvation.

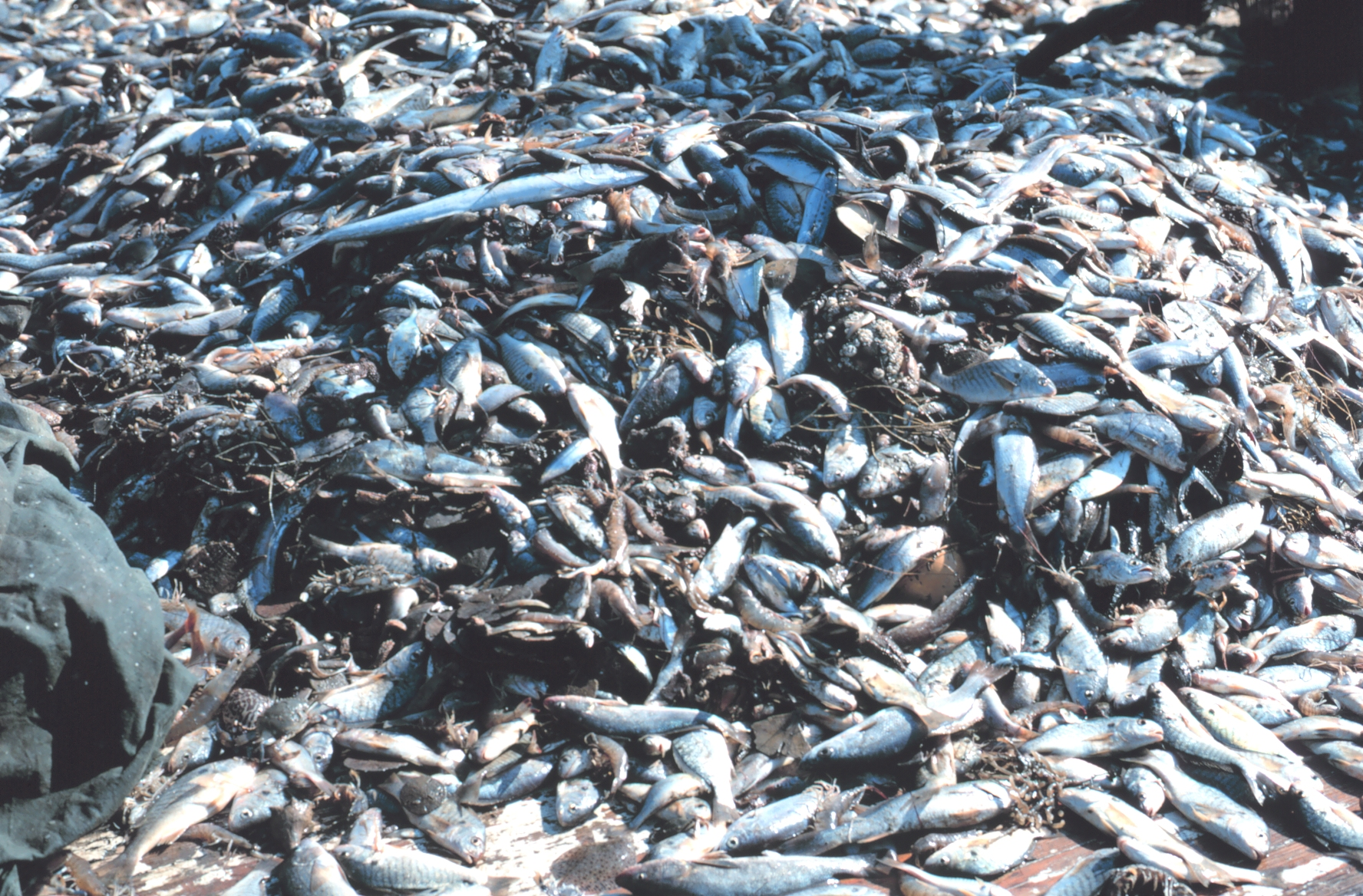
By-catch obtained when targeting shrimps, showing the vast amount of by-catch in fisheries

=== By-catch ===
By-catching is an inevitable aspect of fishing where unwanted fish or other marine organisms including turtles, dolphins and juveniles are caught. This is a by-product of the unselective nature of modern fishing gear, such as bottom trawling which captures everything in the path of the net. Consumer-grade gear such as fishing rods and nets are used by pirate fishers to undertake illegal, unreported and unregulated fishing which adds to the number of marine species taken from their ecosystems.

== Evidence that these methods are unsustainable ==
Examples of unsustainable fishing methods exist globally and impacts the harvest species, as well as all marine species that coexist or rely on the targeted harvest.

- Bottom trawling in Canadian waters have shown the destructive effects of the fishing method. With the establishment of Baffin Bay fishery in 1996, feeding grounds for narwhals in the Canadian Arctic were impacted by vast benthic damage as a result of bottom trawling. Hence, leading marine environmentalists describe bottom trawling as a 'great harm' to fisheries.
- In the 1960s, the commercial use of poisons such as sodium cyanide (cyanide fishing), were used throughout Southeast Asia to serve the market demand for high-value coral fish. This has evidently impacted the local ecosystem through coral bleaching and the killing of untargeted species.
- The use of dynamite fishing or blast fishing is evident in coastal regions of Tanzania. Its widespread use has resulted in marine scientists, international environmental NGOs, and environment activists to label the practice as destructive and unsustainable. The profit from their catches is described to be a factor in the continual use of the dangerous practice.
- During the period between 2000 and 2001, a field study was conducted in Oman to simulate the catch rate of fishing gear that has been lost in the ocean (ghost fishing), by setting nets at various depths in fishing grounds across cities in Oman. The study estimated that the daily mortality rate was1.3kg per trap. Over six months, the predicted mortality rate is 78.4kg per lost gear.
- A study conducted in the Glover's Reef Marine Reserve, Belize, between 2004-2010 and 2011-2017, found that the mortality rates for most species were much higher than the natural mortality rate. This is a result of over-fishing with the main gears being used in those regions consisting of spears and fishing rods. By-catching was also observed through frequent catches of immature grouper and snapper species.

== Mitigation using sustainable methods ==
Concerns around unsustainable fishing methods have been identified by the United Nations Convention on the Law of the Sea treaty. According to the United Nations convention agreements in exclusive economic zones (1994):

- Article 61 focuses on the "conservation of the living resources" which obligates the coastal state to properly conserve and manage its living resources to ensure that these resources are not over-exploited. The state is also obligated to maintain maximum sustainable yield of harvested populations whilst also taking into consideration other species that are associated or depend on that harvested population.
- Article 62 concerns the "utilization of the living resources" in relations to the governing of harvesting those living resources within the coastal state's exclusive economic zone. This includes the enforcement of conservation measures, such as the licensing of fishing vessels and equipment, regulating the type, size and amount of gear used and permitting the landing of all or any part of the catch in ports.
- Article 65 relates to "marine mammals" and the rights of the coastal state to prohibit, limit, or regulate the exploitation of marine animals.

These convention agreements are recognized by global fisheries that employ harvest strategies and guidelines, such as gear restrictions and deployment limits, to maintain the use of these unsustainable fishing methods. Examples of such strategies and guidelines employed by global fisheries are listed below:

- The Australian Fisheries Management Authority (AFMA) recognizes the impact that bottom trawlers may have on sensitive habitat areas, like reef structures (AFMA, 2020). As a result, management arrangements that include the compulsory use of physical devices, such as bycatch reduction devices (BRD) within trawls, ensures that the use of trawl poses the least environmental impact. BRDs minimizes the by-catch of many species of juveniles, by using a minimum sized mesh which enables untargeted fish species to escape the trawl net.
- Fisheries and Oceans Canada identifies ghost fishing as a major threat to the marine ecosystem. Resultantly, Canadian fisheries have implemented a cooperative strategy with harvesters, to undertake ghost-gear removal. This extends to the implementation of compulsory reporting of lost fishing gear and the active seeking of mitigation methods that may reduce the occurrence and impact of ghost fishing.
- The National Oceanic and Atmospheric Administration fisheries (NOAA fisheries) in the United States of America, describes by-catch as a global issue that threatens the sustainability of fishing communities. NOAA fisheries have implemented a National Bycatch Reduction Strategy that incorporates three major laws. In accordance to these laws, US fisheries require trawling vessels to use turtle excluder devices (TEDs) that mitigate the capture of turtles in trawl nets. This extends to the use of additional TEDs and the promotion of sustainable fishing practices. The three major laws include:
  - Endangered Species Act (ESA).
  - Marine Mammal Protection Act (MMPA).
  - Magnuson-Stevens Fishery Conservation and Management Act (MSA).
- The Philippines fisheries code Republic Act 10654 was amended in 2015, in recognition of the region's over-exploitation of unreported and unregulated fishing. The Act was amended in the Philippine's pursuit to comply with international conventions, in order to converse and manage fish species and resources. Section 92 relates to fishing through explosives (dynamite fishing) and poisonous substances (cyanide fishing), stating that the use of these methods will result in an administrative fine and/or imprisonment upon conviction by a court of law.

== Obstacles for mitigation ==
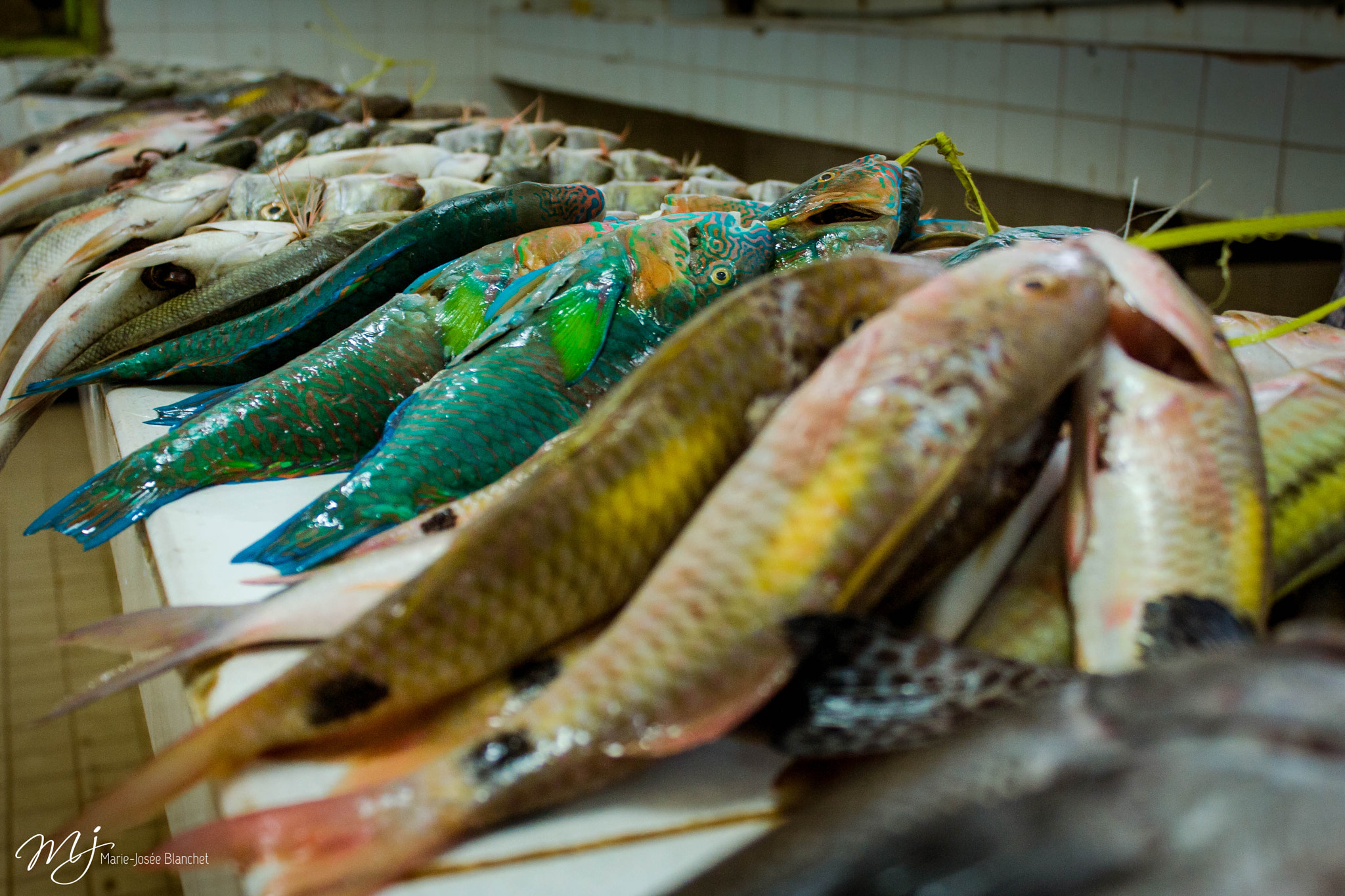
Parrotfish (Sparisoma viride) shown to be lined up at a market

As fisheries are important both socially and economically, it is difficult to maintain a socioeconomic sustainable management system that considers the environmental impact of fishing methods, particularly in under-developed regions where communities rely on fisheries for their livelihood. Additionally, under-developed regions tend to lack fisheries management and enforcement. When compared to more developed regions in the world, under-developed regions, on average, account for three-fold greater harvest rates.

This shows an obstacle for mitigating unsustainable fishing methods, which is influenced by a social-ecological trade off. In developing regions where communities are classified as low-income, fisheries are a means of both food security and income, which are threatened by the enforcement of regulations and management. This impact can be observed through the closed fishing season policy for sardines in the Philippines. The immediate loss of income to fishery workers' low-income households had eroded the community's favorability of the policy, which also posed an implementation issue for future policies and regulations.

The challenge of pursuing environmental-based objectives is the simultaneous maintenance of social sustainability. Social factors, through social conception of human well-being, can potentially improve the implementation of fisheries regulation and governance. This remains a difficult concept in developing fishery regions, such as Caribbean coral reef fisheries, where managing and regulating parrotfish (Sparisoma viride) resulted in an initial decrease in fishery workers' income, who rely heavily on the species. To low income communities, this decreased income drastically undermines the management of fisheries.

In particular, when there exists a high demand and price in global markets for specific fish species, low income communities who have access to those species have been observed to be the main cause of over-fishing. In a region where fishermen have fewer alternatives to earn income, and where fishery regulation and management have weak control, over-fishing of highly desired fish species is observed as the best option to improve social well-being, despite its environmental impact. This coincides with illegal fishing practices (pirate fishing) that is fueled by the global demand for exotic seafood.

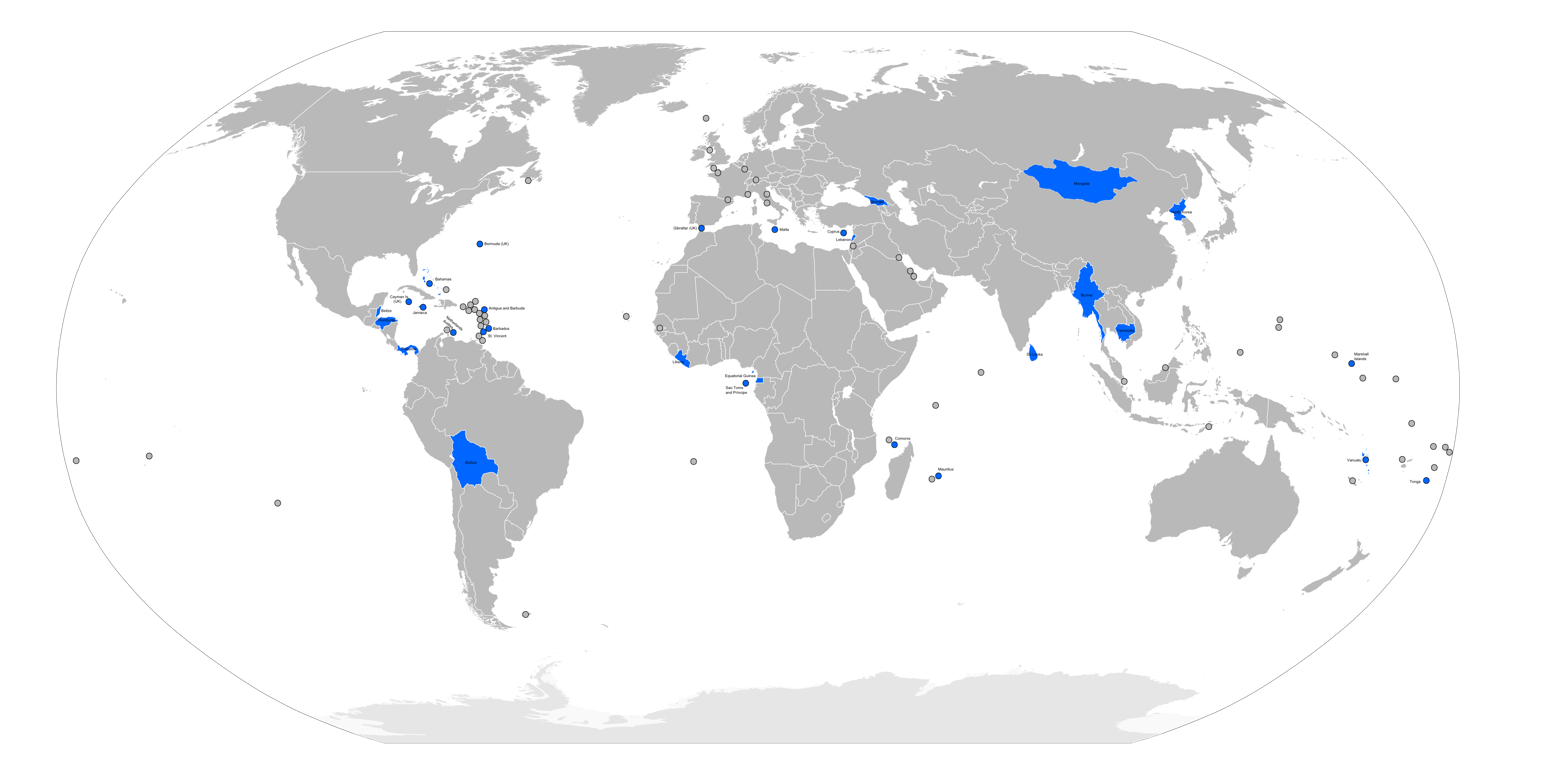
Countries highlighted in blue implement a flag of convenience for their international vessels.

Pirate fishing fostered by the flags of convenience that allow vessels to operate under a state's flag where there exists limited fisheries regulations or laws, enables fishing vessels the ability to practice illegal, unreported and unregulated fishing. This U.S. $1.2 billion-dollar industry poses a drastic impact on global fish populations and blatantly undermines the international rules of conversation and management of the high seas resources, according to Ian Macdonald, Australian Minister for Fisheries, Forestry and Conservation (2003-2010). Illegal and unreported fishing contributes to the reduction in fish stocks and hinders the ability for fish populations to recover. It is believed that between 10 billion and 23 billion instances of illegal and unreported fishing happen annually, with communities in developing countries being more likely to partake in these illegal activities.

== See also ==
- Bottom trawling
- Environmental effects of fishing
- Fishing techniques
- Ghost net
- Marine Stewardship Council
- Sea Fish Industry Authority
- Sustainable fishery
- United Nations Convention on the Law of the Sea Treaty
