= Queensland Government Tourist Bureau =

Queensland Government tourism agency

The Queensland Government Tourist Bureau was a department of the Queensland Government in Australia, responsible for promoting tourism in Queensland and acting as a booking agent for Queensland tourist businesses. It was also known as Queensland Government Intelligence and Tourist Bureau.

== History ==
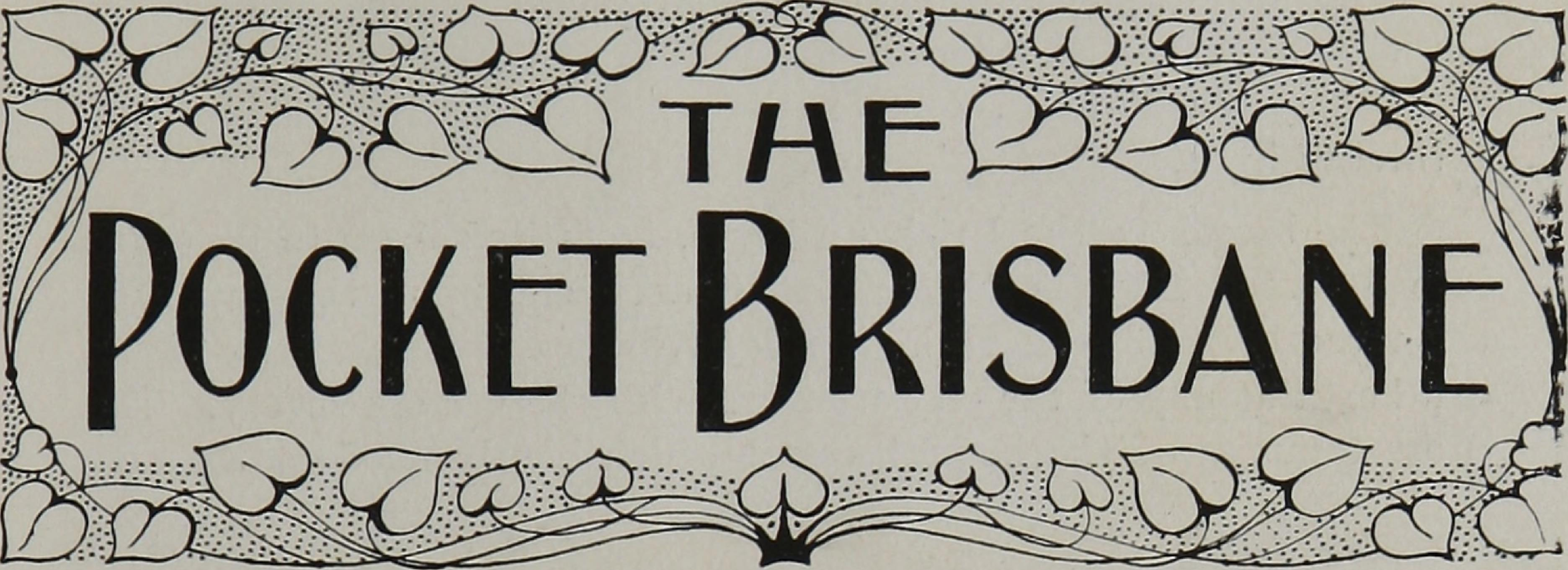
The Pocket Brisbane was a tourist guide produced annually (1910–1929) by the Queensland Government Intelligence and Tourist Bureau.

The Queensland Government Intelligence and Tourist Bureau was established as a sub-department of the Chief Secretary's Office on 11 April 1907. In 1929 it was transferred to the Railway Department. In 1945–1946 it was renamed Queensland Government Tourist Bureau.

On 1 August 1979, the Queensland Tourist and Travel Corporation was established, but continued to trade under the name Queensland Government Tourist Bureau. On 30 June 1984, the name was officially changed to Queensland Government Travel Centres.
