= Wet Tropics Management Authority =

The Wet Tropics Management Authority (WTMA) is an Australian environmental body. Formed in 1992, the organisation is "charged with managing the Wet Tropics World Heritage Area according to Australia's obligations under the World Heritage Convention." The Authority is based in Cairns, Queensland.

It is jointly funded by the Australian Federal, and Queensland State governments. As of 2017 the WTMA employed about 52 staff.

The WTMA operates under the Wet Tropics World Heritage Protection and Management Act 1993.

== Governance ==
The WTMA has a board of six part-time directors, serving for up to three years, plus a full-time non-voting executive director. The Federal and Queensland governments each nominate two directors. At least one Federal nominee must be an Aboriginal Australian. The Wet Tropics Ministerial Forum, comprising the Federal and Queensland State Ministers with environmental portfolios, nominate the boards chair, and an Aboriginal director. The board usually meets quarterly. The organisation is led by Executive Director Scott Buchanan.

== Science Advisory Committee ==
The WTMA board appoints suitably qualified people to its Scientific Advisory Committee. The committee advises the board on "scientific research that contributes to the protection, conservation and scientific developments relevant to the Wet Tropics of Queensland World Heritage Area."
