= December 1993 =

Month of 1993

| << | December 1993 | | | | | >> |
| Su | Mo | Tu | We | Th | Fr | Sa |
| | | | 1 | 2 | 3 | 4 |
| 5 | 6 | 7 | 8 | 9 | 10 | 11 |
| 12 | 13 | 14 | 15 | 16 | 17 | 18 |
| 19 | 20 | 21 | 22 | 23 | 24 | 25 |
| 26 | 27 | 28 | 29 | 30 | 31 |

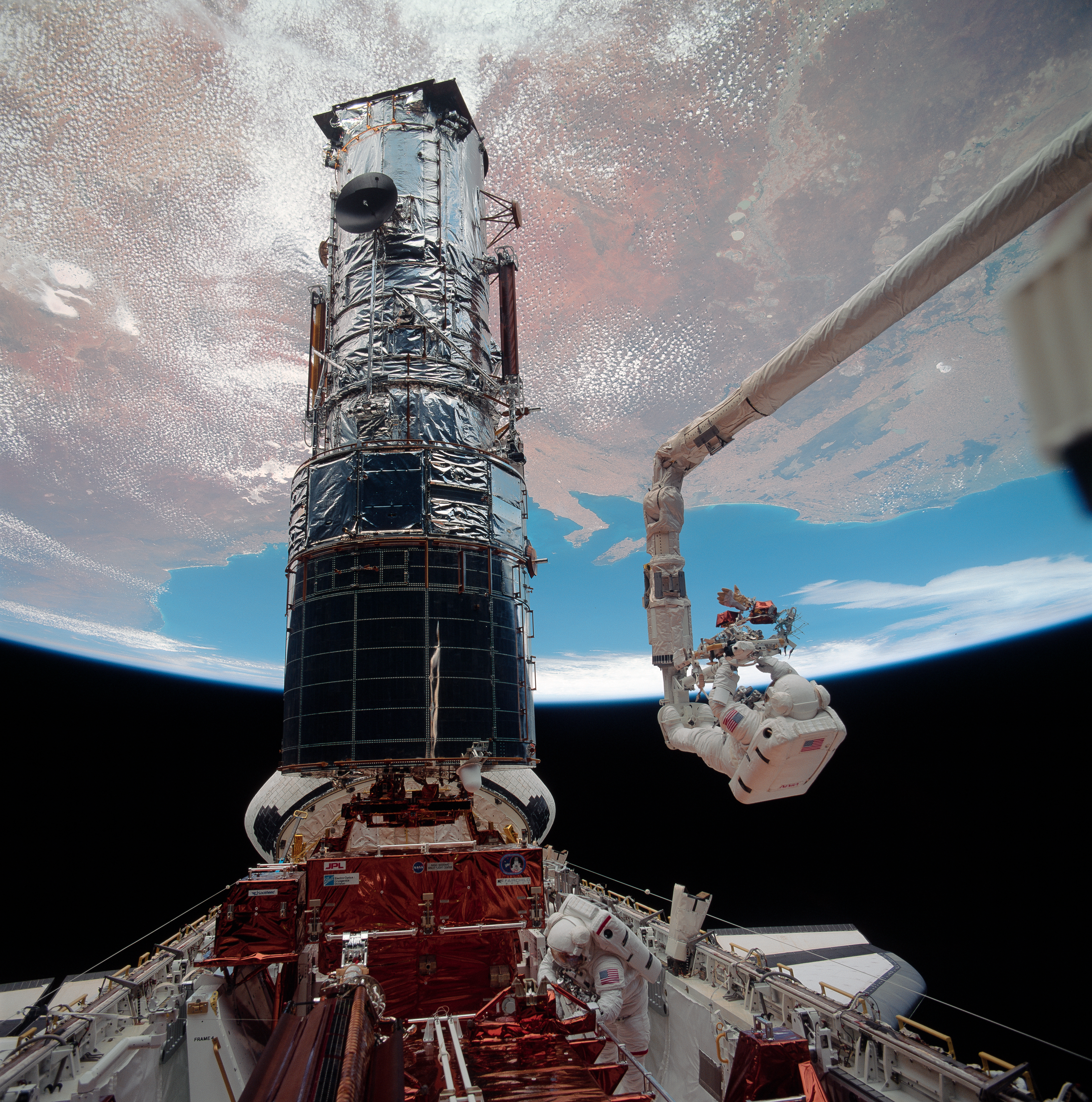
December 9, 1993: Astronauts Story Musgrave (on robot arm) and Jeffrey A. Hoffman repairing the Hubble Space Telescope.

The following events occurred in December 1993. For a more complete listing of notable deaths this month, see Deaths in December 1993.

== December 1, 1993 (Wednesday) ==
- In a barracks room at Naval Amphibious Base Coronado, California, United States Navy Ensign George P. Smith shot and killed Lt. j.g. Alton Grizzard, a former Navy Midshipmen quarterback, and Ensign Kerryn O'Neill, then shot and killed himself.
- In the desert near the border between Yemen and Saudi Arabia, Yemeni kidnappers freed American diplomat Haynes Mahoney after abducting him on November 25. Mahoney's captors negotiated with the Yemeni government for his release, making no demands of the U.S. government.
- On World AIDS Day, the World Health Organization announced that 14 million people worldwide were now infected with HIV, the virus that causes AIDS.
- A 19-year-old member of AIDS activist organization ACT-UP, who identified himself as "Luke Sissyfag", heckled U.S. President Bill Clinton during his World AIDS Day speech at Georgetown University Medical Center in Washington, D.C., shouting, "You are doing nothing. You are sitting on your hands."
- United States Secretary of the Navy John Howard Dalton announced that the Navy would assign hundreds of female sailors to aircraft carriers in 1994.
- NASA postponed the scheduled launch of Space Shuttle Endeavour for the STS-61 mission until the following day due to weather.
- Northwest Airlink Flight 5719 crashed in fog and drizzle during final approach to Chisholm-Hibbing Airport in Hibbing, Minnesota, killing all 18 people aboard.
- Born: Reena Pärnat, Estonian Olympic archer; in Pärnu, Estonia
- Died:
  - Lynette Davies, 45, Welsh actress, suicide by drowning (approximate date)
  - Ray Gillen, American rock singer-songwriter, 32 or 34, AIDS-related illness
  - Sir Ivor Hele, CBE, 81, Australian war artist and portraitist

== December 2, 1993 (Thursday) ==
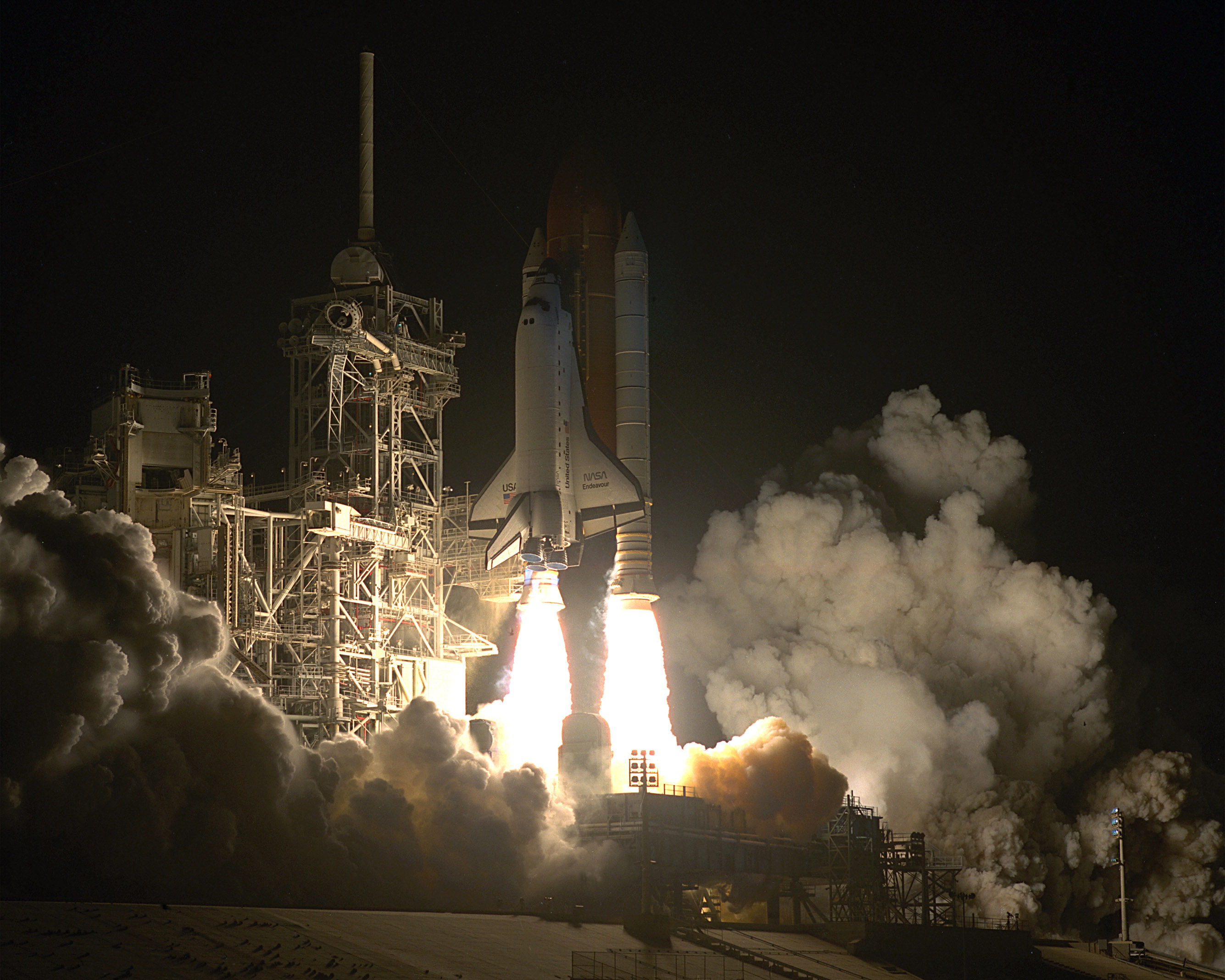
December 2, 1993: Launch of STS-61.

- NASA launched the Space Shuttle Endeavour on the STS-61 mission, the first Hubble Space Telescope servicing mission, at 4:26 a.m. Eastern Standard Time.
- French car maker Renault and Swedish car maker Volvo canceled a planned merger that would have created the world's sixth-largest automotive manufacturer after executives at Volvo forced a withdrawal over concerns about the direction of the future merged company.
- 23-year-old British Army soldier Paul Garrett was shot and killed by an Irish Republican Army sniper during an Army foot patrol in Keady, County Armagh, Northern Ireland.
- Detective James Edward O'Brien of the Oxnard, California Police Department was shot and killed while pursuing the suspect in a mass shooting at an unemployment office.
- Born:
  - Kevin Fischnaller, Italian Olympic luger; in Brixen, South Tyrol, Italy
  - Haruka Ishida, Japanese actress and television personality; in Saitama Prefecture, Japan
  - Jak Roberto, Filipino actor, model and singer; in Nagcarlan, Laguna, Philippines
  - Kostas Stafylidis, Greek footballer; in Thessaloniki, Greece
- Died:
  - Harry Julius Emeléus CBE, FRS, 90, British inorganic chemist
  - Pablo Escobar, 44, Colombian drug lord, shot by Colombian National Police in Medellín, Colombia

== December 3, 1993 (Friday) ==
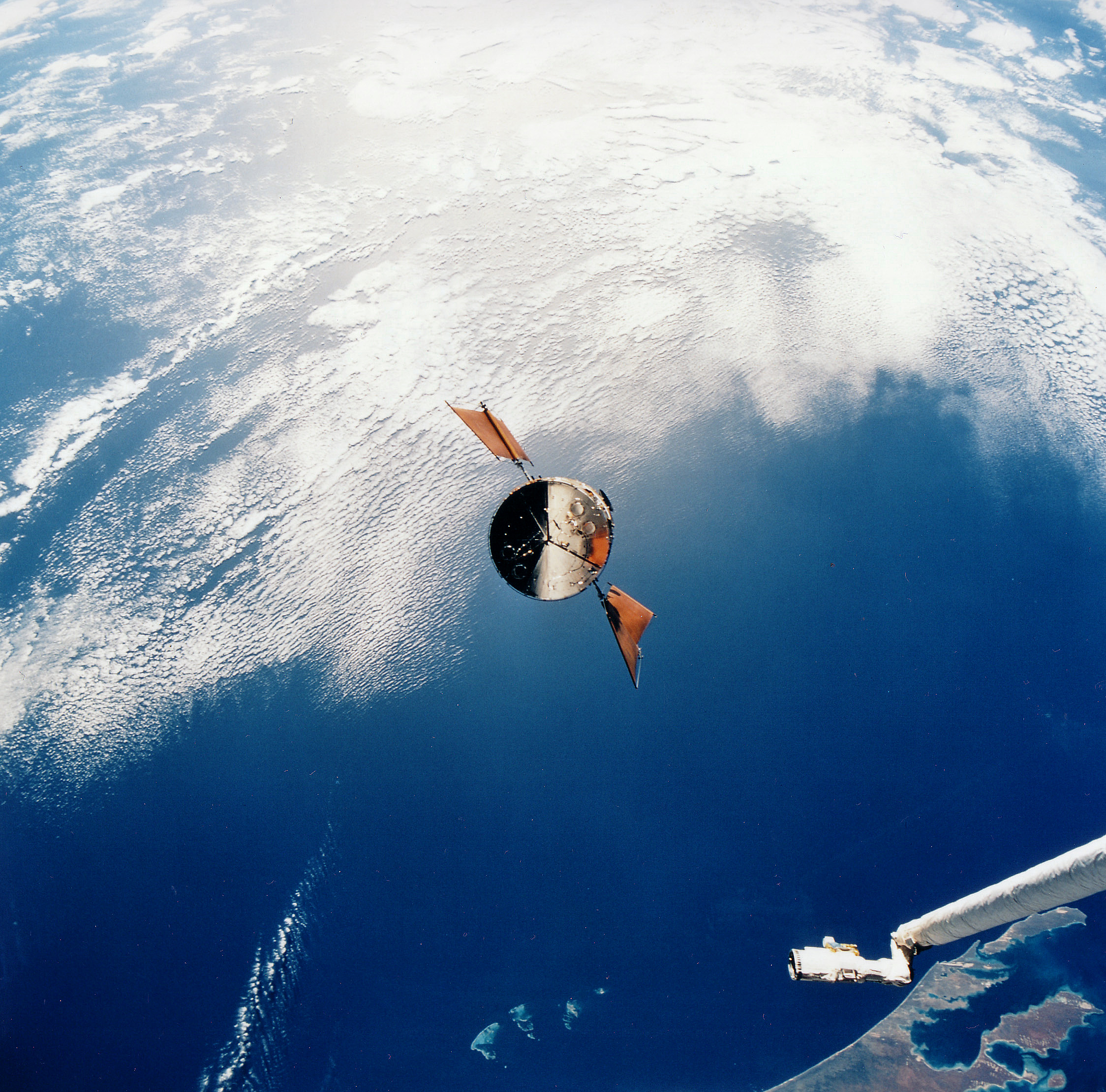
The Hubble Space Telescope as seen from the approaching Endeavour.

- The crew of Space Shuttle Endeavour sighted the Hubble Space Telescope and began the process of orbital rendezvous.
- Law enforcement authorities seized 315 kilograms (694 lb) of heroin in Pae, Thailand.
- The 1993 Davis Cup men's tennis final between Germany and Australia began at the Messe Düsseldorf Exhibition Hall in Düsseldorf, Germany.
- In Hartberg and Vienna, Austria, Roman Catholic priest August Janisch and journalist Silvana Meixner were injured when they opened letter bombs addressed to them. These would prove to be the first of a series of letter bombings targeted at advocates for ethnic minorities and immigrants in Austria.
- The 1993 National Finals Rodeo began at the Thomas and Mack Arena in Paradise, Nevada. It would conclude on December 12.
- Born:
  - Marques Brownlee, American YouTuber and professional ultimate frisbee player; in Maplewood, New Jersey
  - Clare Cryan, Irish diver
- Died:
  - Witold Majchrzycki, 84, Polish Olympic boxer
  - Lea Mek, 18, member of the Asian Boyz street gang, murdered in gang shooting
  - Lewis Thomas, 80, American physician, author and educator, Waldenstrom's disease

== December 4, 1993 (Saturday) ==
- Swiss astronaut Claude Nicollier captured the Hubble Space Telescope with Space Shuttle Endeavour's remote manipulator arm and berthed it in the shuttle's payload bay at 4:26 a.m. EST. At 10:46 p.m. EST, American astronauts Story Musgrave and Jeffrey A. Hoffman began the mission's first extravehicular activity, which would be the second-longest spacewalk up to that point in NASA's history.
- In Austria, a letter bomb sent to Helmut Schüller, president of the humanitarian organization Caritas Internationalis, was detected before being opened.
- On or about this date, police officer L.C. Underwood kidnapped and murdered Victor Gunnarsson, a former suspect in the 1986 assassination of Olof Palme, in North Carolina, perceiving Gunnarsson as a romantic rival for his former fiancée, Kay Weden. Three days later Weden's mother, Catherine Miller, would also be murdered; Underwood would be accused of that killing as well, but would never be tried for it.
- In the 1993 SEC Championship Game, played at Legion Field in Birmingham, Alabama, the Florida Gators defeated the Alabama Crimson Tide by a score of 28–13.
- American serial killer Richard Allen Davis provided investigators with information that allowed them to find the body of 12-year-old Polly Klaas, whom Davis had murdered on October 1.
- Born: Taco van der Hoorn, Dutch cyclist; in Rotterdam, Netherlands
- Died:
  - Margaret Landon, 90, American Presbyterian missionary and writer
  - Hugh Moore, QPM, 64, City of London Police commander, heart failure two weeks after violent struggle with suspect
  - Roy Vernon, 56, Welsh international footballer, cancer
  - Frank Zappa, 52, American guitarist and composer, prostate cancer

== December 5, 1993 (Sunday) ==
- American astronauts Kathryn C. Thornton and Thomas Akers conducted the STS-61 mission's second extravehicular activity overnight (EST).
- The 1993 World Women's Handball Championship concluded in Norway; Germany defeated Denmark in the final.
- The 1993 Davis Cup final concluded in Düsseldorf, Germany, with Germany defeating Australia 4:1.
- Omar Bongo was re-elected as President of Gabon in the country's first multiparty elections.
- Helmut Zilk, the Mayor of Vienna, was severely injured and lost two fingers when he opened a letter bomb at his home. On the same day, two other letter bombs in Austria, one sent to the leader of a community of Slovenes and the other to Austrian Green Party politician Madeleine Petrovic, were discovered and neutralized before being opened. The series of letter bombings would prove to have been perpetrated by far-right extremist Franz Fuchs.
- Catholic civilians John Todd, 31, and Brian Duffy, 15, were shot and killed by the Ulster Freedom Fighters while sitting in a car outside a taxi depot in Ligoniel, Belfast, Northern Ireland.
- Rafael Caldera was elected President of Venezuela for the second time, succeeding interim president Ramón José Velásquez.
- Born: Ross Barkley, English footballer; in Liverpool, England
- Died:
  - Doug Hopkins, 32, American musician and songwriter, suicide by gunshot
  - Rita Macedo, 68, Mexican actress, suicide by gunshot

== December 6, 1993 (Monday) ==
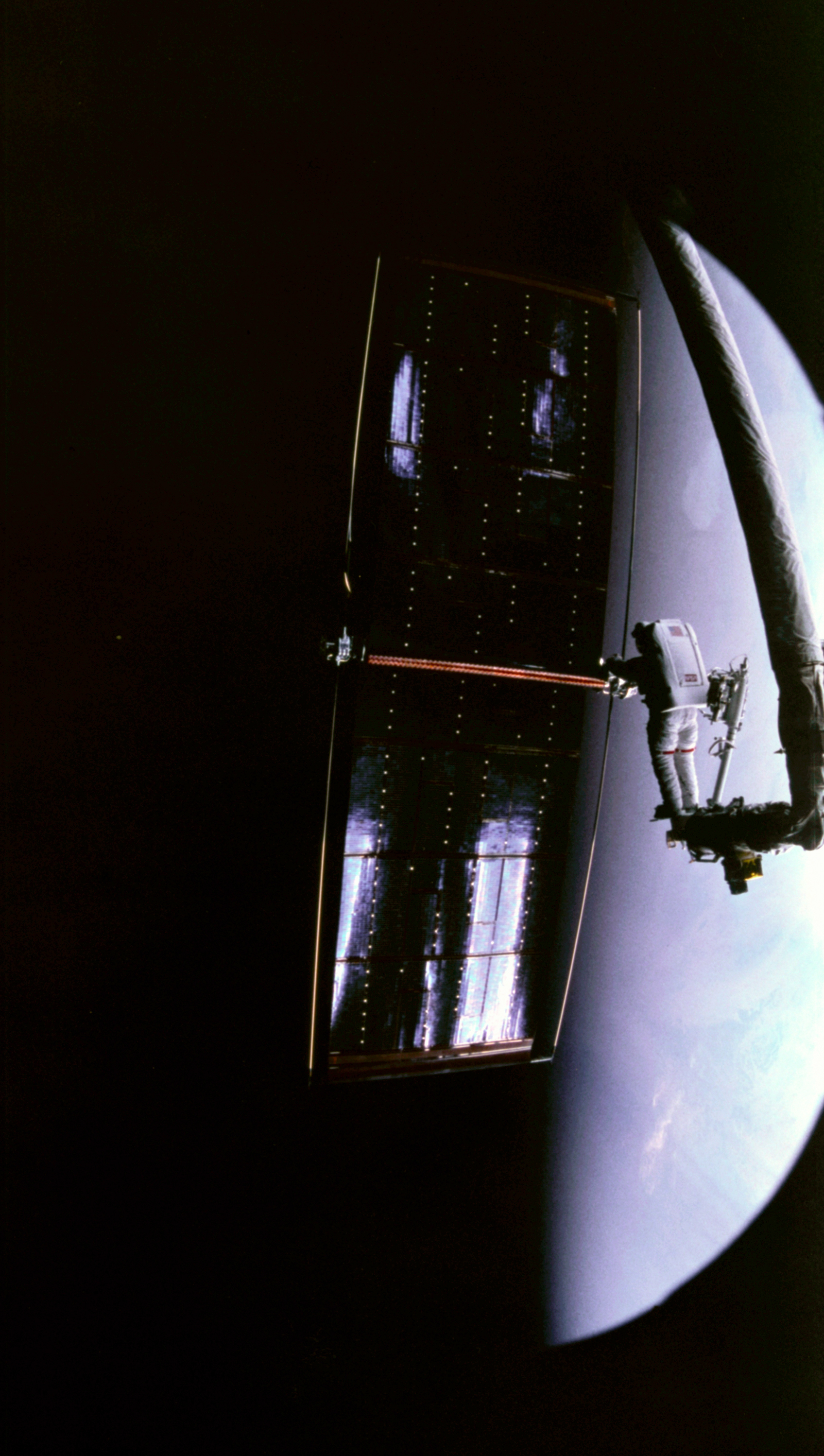
December 6, 1993: NASA astronaut Kathryn C. Thornton jettisons a damaged HST solar panel into space during STS-61 EVA #2.

- Astronauts Musgrave and Hoffman began the STS-61 mission's third extravehicular activity at 10:34 p.m. EST.
- Between 10:00 p.m. on December 6 and 1:00 a.m. on December 7, 46-year-old Lynn Marie Stansfield and 43-year-old Dale Gene Wolf were shot to death in a house in Penn Township, Perry County, Pennsylvania. Firefighters discovered their bodies after responding to a fire at the house; it is believed the fire was set to destroy evidence. As of 2019 the murders would remain unsolved.
- Born:
  - Jasprit Bumrah, Indian cricketer; in Ahmedabad, Gujarat, India
  - Pedro Mendes, Portuguese footballer; in Barreiro, Portugal
  - Tautau Moga, Samoa international rugby league footballer; in Ipswich, Queensland, Australia
  - Miljan Rovcanin, Serbian professional boxer; in Bar, Republic of Montenegro, Federal Republic of Yugoslavia
- Died:
  - Don Ameche, 85, American actor, prostate cancer
  - Alexandre Trauner, 87, Hungarian set designer

== December 7, 1993 (Tuesday) ==
- Astronauts Thornton and Akers began the STS-61 mission's fourth extravehicular activity at 10:13 p.m. EST. They replaced Hubble's High Speed Photometer (HSP) with the Corrective Optics Space Telescope Axial Replacement (COSTAR), the device that would correct for the spherical aberration of Hubble's primary mirror.
- The Transitional Executive Committee, a government-in-waiting including members of the African National Congress and the National Party, was established in South Africa.
- 38-year-old Catholic civilian Robert McClay was shot and killed by the Ulster Freedom Fighters at his home in Ballyhackamore, Belfast, Northern Ireland.
- In Garden City, New York, six people were murdered and 19 injured in the 1993 Long Island Rail Road shooting, a racially motivated mass shooting perpetrated by Colin Ferguson, a black Jamaican immigrant.
- Richard Allen Davis was charged with the kidnapping and murder of Polly Klaas.
- Born:
  - Jasmine V (born Jasmine Marie Villegas), American singer; in San Jose, California
  - Rahama Sadau, Nigerian actress and filmmaker; in Kaduna, Nigeria
  - Kiyou Shimizu, Japanese Olympic karateka; in Osaka, Japan
- Died:
  - Nicky Crane, 35, English neo-Nazi activist, AIDS-related bronchopneumonia
  - Abidin Dino, 80, Turkish artist and painter
  - Félix Houphouët-Boigny, 88, 1st President of Ivory Coast, the oldest African head of state, prostate cancer
  - Wolfgang Paul, 80, German physicist, Nobel Prize laureate

== December 8, 1993 (Wednesday) ==
- Astronauts Musgrave and Hoffman began the STS-61 mission's fifth and final extravehicular activity at 10:30 p.m. EST. The EVA would conclude at 5:51 a.m. EST on December 9.
- In Schleswig, Schleswig-Holstein, Germany, neo-Nazis Michael Peters and Lars Christiansen were convicted of the murders of the three Turkish people killed in the 1992 Mölln arson attack. For the firebombing that killed 51-year-old Bahide Arslan, 10-year-old Yeliz Arslan and 14-year-old Ayse Yilmaz, Peters was sentenced to life in prison and Christiansen to 10 years. These were the maximum possible sentences, since Christiansen was 19 at the time of the murders and was tried as a juvenile.
- Using eight pens, U.S. President Bill Clinton signed the North American Free Trade Agreement into law.
- Massachusetts General Hospital and Brigham and Women's Hospital, both in Boston, Massachusetts, approved a merger to cut costs and gain greater bargaining power with insurance companies. Each hospital would retain its own name and programs.
- Born:
  - Janari Jõesaar, Estonian professional basketball player
  - Cara Mund, Miss America 2018; in Bismarck, North Dakota
  - Jordan Obita, English footballer; in Oxford, England
  - AnnaSophia Robb, American actress, singer and model; in Denver, Colorado
  - Óscar Salas, Honduran professional and Olympic footballer; in Olanchito, Honduras
- Died: Yevgeny Minayev, 60, Soviet Olympic champion weightlifter, starvation and hypothermia

== December 9, 1993 (Thursday) ==
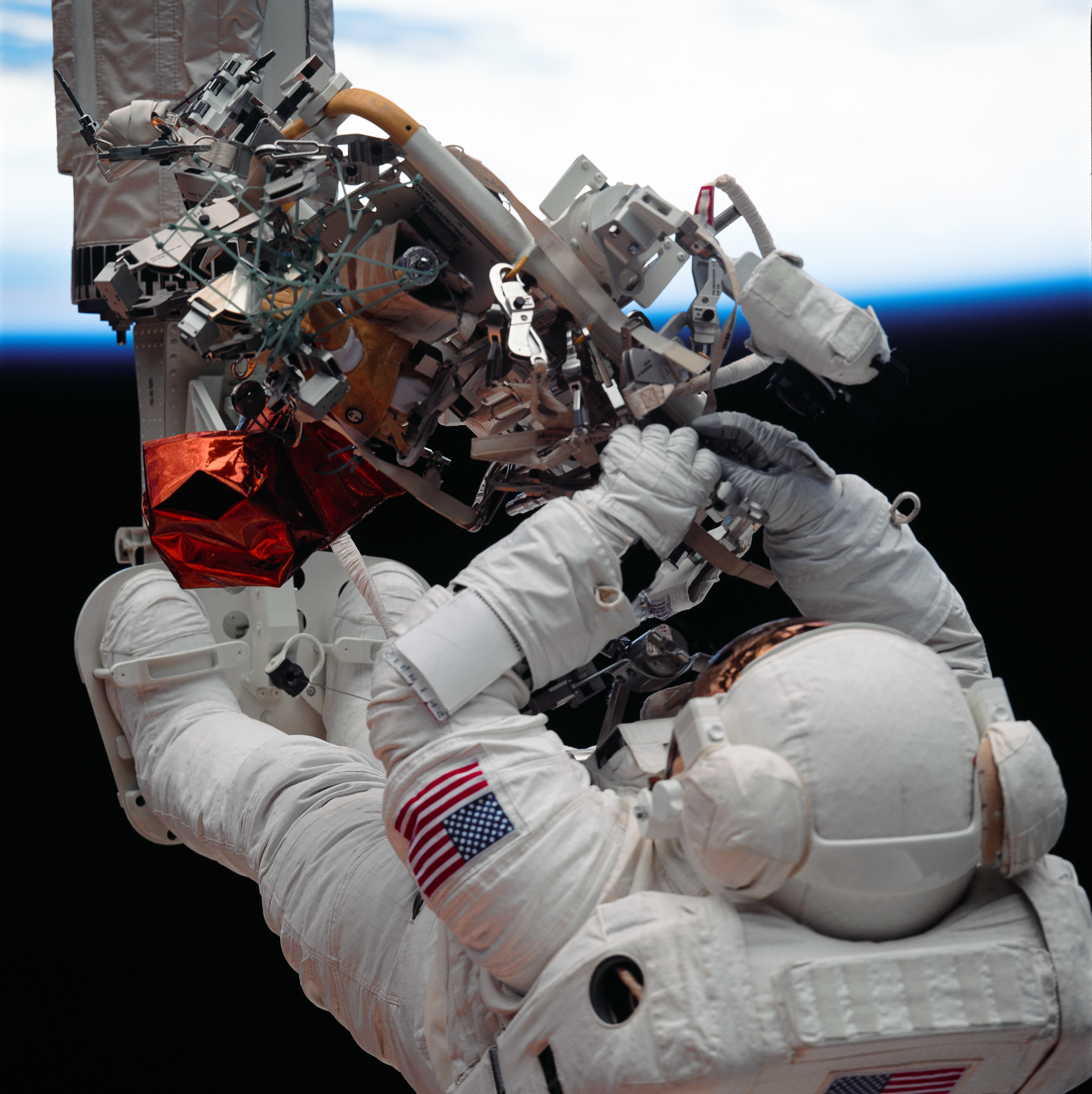
December 9, 1993: NASA astronaut Story Musgrave during STS-61 EVA #5.

- Andrew Lloyd Webber's musical Sunset Boulevard received its American premiere in Los Angeles.
- Born:
  - Mark McMorris, Canadian professional and Olympic snowboarder; in Regina, Saskatchewan, Canada
  - Laura Smulders, Dutch Olympic racing cyclist; in Nijmegen, Netherlands
  - Olga Zubova, Russian weightlifter
- Died: Danny Blanchflower, 67, Northern Ireland international footballer and football manager, bronchopneumonia

== December 10, 1993 (Friday) ==
- The crew of Space Shuttle Endeavour released the repaired Hubble Space Telescope back into orbit.
- 62-year-old Libyan human rights activist Mansour Rashid El-Kikhia, an opponent of Muammar Gaddafi, disappeared in Cairo, Egypt. His body would be found in October 2012 in a refrigerator in Tripoli, Libya.
- A knife-wielding man hijacked Air France Flight 2306 between Paris and Nice shortly before arriving at Nice. Despite demands to be flown to Tripoli, the aircraft landed as intended at Nice Côte d'Azur Airport, where all 123 passengers and six crew members onboard were released unharmed.
- Scottish soldiers Paul Callaghan and David Reid of the British Army's 5th Airborne Brigade were last seen alive this morning as they began an off-duty climbing weekend in Glen Coe, during which they would be swept away by an avalanche on Stob Coire nan Beith. After an extensive and dangerous search and rescue effort, their bodies would be found at the bottom of Summit Gully on December 14.
- The last shift left Monkwearmouth Colliery in Sunderland, Tyne and Wear, England. The closure of the 158-year-old pit marked the end of the old County Durham coalfield, which had been in operation since the Middle Ages.
- Nelson Mandela and F. W. de Klerk were awarded the 1993 Nobel Peace Prize at Oslo City Hall in Oslo, Norway.
- id Software's Doom was released, becoming a landmark title in first-person shooter video games.
- Died:
  - Fernand Mithouard, 84, French professional cyclist
  - Alice Tully, 91, American opera and recital singer and arts patron
  - Alan E. Zimmer, M.D., 64, American neuroradiologist, stroke

== December 11, 1993 (Saturday) ==
- One of the three blocks of the Highland Towers near Kuala Lumpur, Malaysia collapsed, killing 48.
- Henri Konan Bédié succeeded Félix Houphouët-Boigny, who died on December 7, as President of Ivory Coast.
- In the 1993 Chilean general election, Eduardo Frei Ruiz-Tagle was elected President of Chile with 58% of the vote.
- In the Atlantic Ocean, the 30-foot (9.1 m) boat on which 63-year-old Herbert Clarity and 47-year-old Anthony Suraleigh were sailing from New York to Bermuda capsized in a sudden storm with 35-foot (11 m) waves and 70-mile-per-hour (110 km/h) winds. The two men rode out the storm in a life raft for 11 hours before a Japanese freighter headed for Ireland rescued them. Clarity and Suraleigh would fly back to New York from Ireland on December 23.
- In Howard County, Maryland, 23-year-old David Mark Kohl was crushed to death by his brother's house when it slipped and fell on him while being raised on jacks to install a foundation underneath.
- Born:
  - Yalitza Aparicio, Mexican actress and educator; in Tlaxiaco, Mexico
  - Tyrone Gilks, Australian motorcycle personality; in Newcastle, New South Wales, Australia (d. 2013 in training crash)
  - Mikoy Morales (born Vincent Marco Chu Morales), Filipino actor, model and singer; in Roxas, Capiz, Philippines
- Died:
  - Bill Mumm OBE JP, 71, New Zealand rugby union player and politician
  - Elvira Popescu, 99, Romanian-French actress

== December 12, 1993 (Sunday) ==
- In the 1993 Russian constitutional referendum, 58.4% of voters approved of the new Constitution of Russia.
- Protestants Andrew Beacom, 46, and Ernest Smith, 49, both members of the Royal Ulster Constabulary, were shot and killed by the Irish Republican Army while sitting in an RUC civilian-type car in Fivemiletown, County Tyrone, Northern Ireland.
- In Palm Beach County, Florida, a 450-pound (200 kg) lion named Helmut attacked and severely injured an employee at Lion Country Safari.
- Born: Zeli Ismail, English footballer; in Kukës, Albania
- Died:
  - József Antall, 61, 53rd Prime Minister of Hungary, non-Hodgkin lymphoma
  - Ned Barry, 88, New Zealand rugby union player and police officer

== December 13, 1993 (Monday) ==
- 60 people died and 8 were injured in a fire at a textile factory in Fuzhou, China.

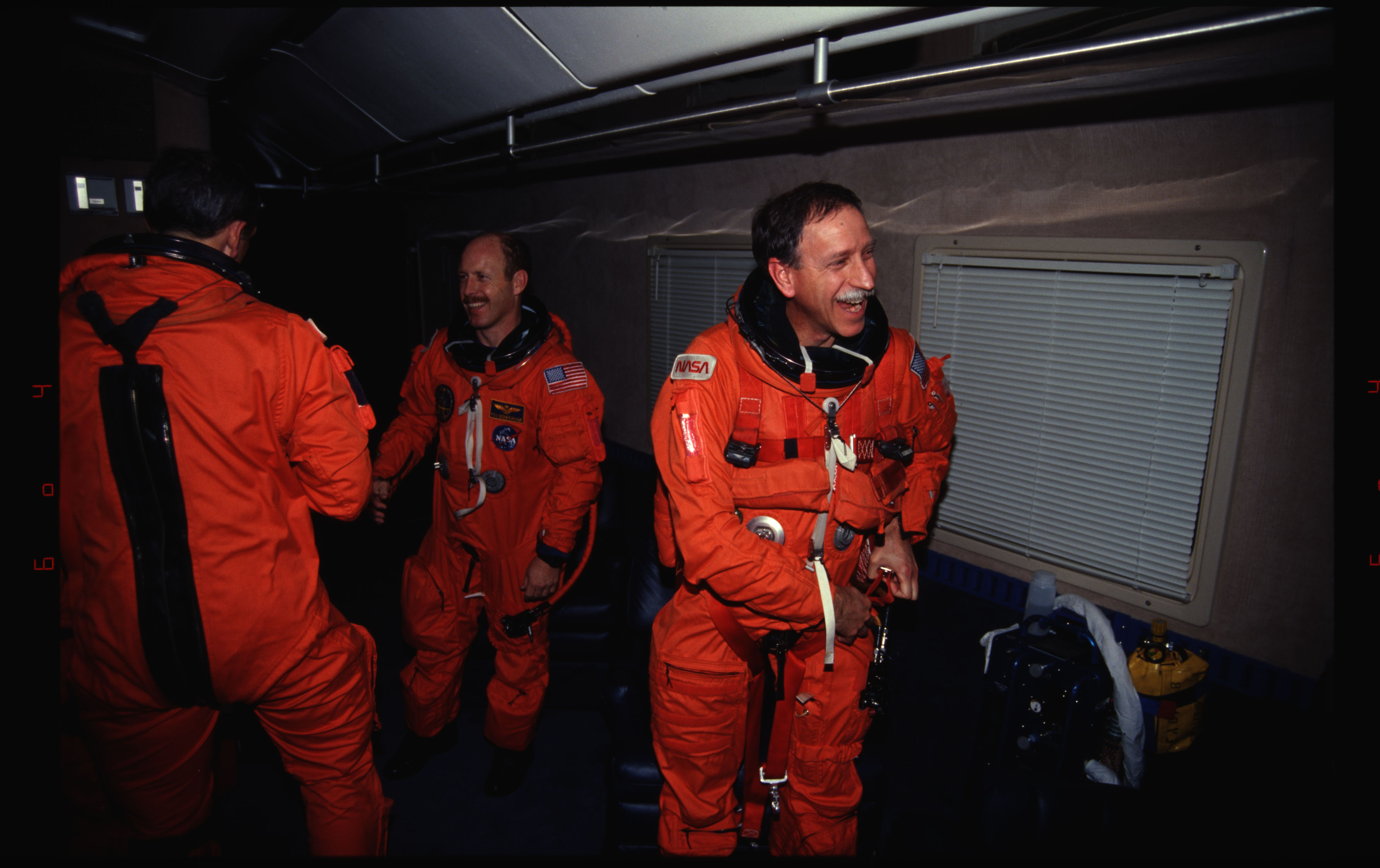
December 13, 1993: STS-61 crewmembers after landing.

- Space Shuttle Endeavour landed at Kennedy Space Center at 12:26 a.m. EST, completing the successful STS-61 mission to repair the Hubble Space Telescope.
- The Congress of the Philippines enacted Republic Act No. 7659, reinstating capital punishment for selected crimes, which had been banned in the 1987 Constitution of the Philippines.
- The Parliament of Kazakhstan approved the Treaty on the Non-Proliferation of Nuclear Weapons and agreed to dismantle the more than 100 missiles left on its territory by the fall of the USSR.
- French erotic novelists Vanessa Duriès and Jean-Pierre Imbrohoris (known as Joy Laurey), Imbrohoris' wife (writer Nathalie Perreau) and Imbrohoris' son were killed in a traffic collision in Montélimar, France.
- 26-year-old Protestant civilian Noel Cardwell was found dead, shot by the Ulster Freedom Fighters, in an unoccupied flat in Shankill, Belfast, Northern Ireland. He was rumored to have been an informer.
- Former Prime Minister of Canada Kim Campbell resigned as leader of the Progressive Conservative Party and was succeeded as leader by Jean Charest.
- Born: Shaun Edwards, Australian rules footballer
- Died:
  - Larry Cameron, 41, National Football League and Canadian Football League player and professional wrestler; heart attack in ring during match with Tony St. Clair in Bremen, Germany
  - Vanessa Duriès (a.k.a. Katia Lamara), 20–21, French novelist, traffic collision
  - Joy Laurey (pen name of Jean-Pierre Imbrohoris), 50, French novelist, traffic collision

== December 14, 1993 (Tuesday) ==
- Members of the Armed Islamic Group of Algeria massacred 12 Christian employees of the Croatian construction company Hidroelektra in a village southwest of Algiers.
- 19-year-old Nathan Dunlap, a former employee of an Aurora, Colorado Chuck E. Cheese, shot and killed four people at the restaurant and wounded a fifth. Dunlap would be sentenced to death in 1996. His sentence would be commuted to life in prison without the possibility of parole when Colorado abolished the death penalty in 2020.
- Born: Antonio Giovinazzi, Italian racing driver; in Martina Franca, Italy
- Died:
  - Jeff Alm, 25, National Football League defensive tackle, suicide by gunshot after causing his best friend's death in car crash
  - Shirley J. Dreiss, 44, American hydrologist and hydrogeologist, traffic collision
  - Francis Jones CVO, TD, DL, FSA, MA, KStJ, 85, Welsh historian and officer of arms
  - Myrna Loy, 88, American actress

== December 15, 1993 (Wednesday) ==
- A Lockheed C-130 Hercules military plane carrying relief supplies for victims of Typhoon Lola crashed into a hill and exploded in Libmanan, Camarines Sur, Philippines. Out of about 30 people on board, twenty-four bodies were retrieved from the crash site.
- An IAI Westwind business jet crashed in Orange County, California, killing all of the five passengers, including the then current president of In-N-Out Burger Rich Snyder.
- First Nagorno-Karabakh War: The Azerbaijani Armed Forces launched Operation Kalbajar, a military offensive against the Armed Forces of Armenia and the Nagorno-Karabakh Republic, which would continue until February 1994.
- Irish Taoiseach Albert Reynolds and British Prime Minister John Major issued their joint Downing Street Declaration on the future of Northern Ireland.
- The Uruguay Round of General Agreement on Tariffs and Trade (GATT) talks reached a successful conclusion after seven years.
- Born:
  - Yuko Araki, Japanese actress and model; in Tokyo, Japan
  - Alina Eremia, Romanian singer; in Buftea, Ilfov County, Romania
- Died:
  - Raúl Esnal, 37, Uruguayan footballer, murdered in El Salvador; the case remains unsolved
  - Ratu Sir Penaia Ganilau GCMG KCVO KBE DSO ED, 75, 1st President of Fiji, leukemia
  - William Dale Phillips, 68, American chemist

== December 16, 1993 (Thursday) ==
- In Chelsea, Michigan, science teacher Stephen Leith returned to Chelsea High School with a handgun after a meeting to discuss a grievance he had filed over a reprimand for inappropriate remarks about a female student. He shot and killed Superintendent Joseph Piasecki and wounded Principal Ron Mead and teacher Phil Jones. Leith would subsequently be convicted of first-degree murder and sentenced to life in prison without the possibility of parole.
- Born:
  - Jyoti Amge, Indian actress, world's shortest living woman; in Nagpur, Maharashtra, India
  - Thiago Braz, Brazilian Olympic champion pole vaulter; in Marília, São Paulo, Brazil
  - Lola Créton, French actress; in Paris, France
  - Stephan James, Canadian actor; in Toronto, Ontario, Canada
- Died:
  - Charizma (born Charles Edward Hicks Jr.), 20, American MC, murdered
  - Moses Gunn, 64, American actor, complications of asthma
  - Charles Moore, 68, American architect, heart attack
  - Kakuei Tanaka, 75, Japanese politician, 40th Prime Minister of Japan, pneumonia

== December 17, 1993 (Friday) ==
- Brazil's Supreme Federal Court ruled that former President Fernando Collor de Mello could not hold elected office again until 2000 due to political corruption.
- In the State Dining Room of the White House, U.S. President Bill Clinton read A Visit from St. Nicholas to children from six elementary schools in the Washington, D.C., area.
- In the 1993 Las Vegas Bowl, played at the Sam Boyd Silver Bowl in Whitney, Nevada, the Utah State Aggies defeated the Ball State Cardinals by a score of 42–33.
- Born:
  - Kiersey Clemons, American actress and singer; in Los Angeles, California
  - Patricia Kú Flores, Peruvian tennis player; in Lima, Peru
  - Cailin Russo, American model and musician; in San Diego, California
- Died:
  - Bobby Davidson, 65, Scottish football referee
  - Janet Margolin, 50, American actress, ovarian cancer

== December 18, 1993 (Saturday) ==
- In the 1993 NCAA Division I-AA Football Championship Game, played at Marshall University Stadium in Huntington, West Virginia, the Youngstown State Penguins defeated the Marshall Thundering Herd by a score of 17–5.
- The MGM Grand Las Vegas hotel and casino opened in Paradise, Nevada.
- Born:
  - Anton McKee, Icelandic Olympic swimmer; in Reykjavík, Iceland
  - Byron Buxton, American Major League Baseball center fielder; in Baxley, Georgia
  - Kerri Gowler, New Zealand Olympic champion rower; in Raetihi, Manawatū-Whanganui, New Zealand
  - Thomas Lam, Finnish-Dutch footballer; in Amsterdam, Netherlands
  - Ana Porgras, Romanian artistic gymnast; in Galați, Romania
  - Riria Kojima (born Riria Baba), Japanese actress; in Tokyo, Japan
  - Souliya Syphasay, Laotian footballer; in Vientiane, Laos
- Died:
  - Georges Bégué, 82, French engineer and Special Operations Executive agent
  - Helm Glöckler, 84, German amateur racing driver
  - Sam Wanamaker, CBE (born Samuel Wattenmacker), 74, American film director and actor, prostate cancer

== December 19, 1993 (Sunday) ==
- Lansana Conté was confirmed in office in the 1993 Guinean presidential election with 51.71% of the vote.
- Born:
  - Ali Adnan Kadhim, Iraqi professional and Olympic footballer; in Baghdad, Iraq
  - Alkaline (born Earlan Bartley), Jamaican dancehall and reggae musician; in Kingston, Jamaica
  - Leonardo Bittencourt, German footballer; in Leipzig, Saxony, Germany
  - Hermione Corfield, English actress; in London, England
  - Isiah Koech, Kenyan Olympic long-distance runner; in Keringet, Kenya
  - José Leclerc, Dominican Major League Baseball relief pitcher; in Esperanza, Dominican Republic
  - Christopher Rühr, German Olympic field hockey player; in Düsseldorf, North Rhine-Westphalia, Germany
  - Stephanie Venier, Austrian Olympic alpine skier; in Innsbruck, Tyrol, Austria
- Died: Michael Clarke, 47, American musician (The Byrds), liver failure

== December 20, 1993 (Monday) ==
- The United Nations General Assembly voted to appoint a U.N. High Commissioner for Human Rights.
- Ten months after the 1993 World Trade Center bombing, The New York Times reported that the Port Authority of New York and New Jersey was searching for a new advertising agency to encourage greater use of the World Trade Center complex. Former Boston Globe editor Matthew V. Storin would later suggest that this indicated "a return to complacency" after the bombing.
- 17 teenagers died in a fire at the Kheyvis nightclub in Olivos, Buenos Aires, Argentina.
- The Hubble Space Telescope took its first corrected images.
- Born:
  - Ali Abdi, Tunisian footballer; in Sfax, Tunisia
  - Andrea Belotti, Italian footballer; in Calcinate, Italy
  - Yana Egorian, Russian Olympic champion sabre fencer; in Yerevan, Armenia
  - Robeisy Ramírez, Cuban Olympic champion and professional boxer; in Cienfuegos, Cuba
- Died:
  - Gussie Nell Davis, 87, American educator and founder of the Kilgore College Rangerettes
  - W. Edwards Deming, 93, American engineer, professor, author, lecturer, and management consultant; cancer
  - Nazife Güran, 72, Turkish composer
  - Iichirō Hatoyama, 75, Japanese politician and diplomat

== December 21, 1993 (Tuesday) ==
- The Hungarian Parliament elected Péter Boross Prime Minister of Hungary following the death of József Antall on December 12.
- The United States Department of Defense issued the "Don't ask, don't tell" policy under Directive 1304.26.
- Born:
  - Cody Ceci, Canadian professional ice hockey defenceman; in Ottawa, Ontario, Canada
  - Alex Iafallo, American professional ice hockey forward; in Eden, New York
  - Uvaldo Luna, Mexican footballer; in Channelview, Greater Houston, Texas
  - Malcolm Subban, Canadian professional ice hockey goaltender; in Toronto, Ontario, Canada
- Died:
  - Guy des Cars, 82, French novelist
  - Sir Philip Christison, GBE, CB, DSO, MC & Bar, 100, British Army officer
  - Zack Mosley, 87, American comics artist
  - Pekka Niemi, 84, Finnish Olympic cross-country skier
  - Margarita Nikolaeva, 58, Soviet Olympic champion gymnast

== December 22, 1993 (Wednesday) ==
- Croat–Bosniak War: Members of the Army of the Republic of Bosnia and Herzegovina perpetrated the Križančevo selo massacre, killing at least 12 Croatian Defence Council prisoners of war and two female Croatian non-combatants.
- The Republican Party of Texas rejected Dallas preacher James Bridges' application to run in the Republican gubernatorial primary for the 1994 Texas gubernatorial election because the check for the $3,000 filing fee bounced. On the same day, Bridges' church burned down.
- In the Denver, Colorado area, eight shopping malls closed their Santa displays after receiving death threats directed at Santa Claus by mail and fax machine. By the following day, Santa would be greeting children at over a dozen police and fire stations in the area.
- Pop singer Michael Jackson made his first public statement regarding the child molestation allegations leveled against him. In a videotaped address, Jackson called the accusations "totally false" and asked the public to "wait to hear the truth before you label or condemn me."
- Born:
  - Fazly Mazlan (born Muhammad Fazly bin Mazlan), Malaysian footballer; in Muar District, Johor, Malaysia
  - Raphaël Guerreiro, Portuguese footballer; in Le Blanc-Mesnil, France
  - David Klemmer, Australian rugby league footballer; in Sydney, Australia
  - Aliana Lohan, American actress, model, and singer; in Cold Spring Harbor, New York
  - Gabriel Medina (born Gabriel Medina Pinto Ferreira), Brazilian professional surfer; in São Sebastião, São Paulo, Brazil
  - Hedvig Rasmussen, Danish Olympic rower; in Frederiksberg, Denmark
  - Meghan Trainor, American singer-songwriter, musician, and producer; in Nantucket, Massachusetts
- Died:
  - Sylvia Bataille (born Sylvia Maklès), 85, French actress, cardiac arrest
  - Marion Burns, 86, American actress
  - Don DeFore, 80, American actor, cardiac arrest
  - Alexander Mackendrick, 81, British-American film director, pneumonia
  - Salah Zulfikar, 67, Egyptian actor and film producer, heart attack

== December 23, 1993 (Thursday) ==
- Pope John Paul II declared Émilie Gamelin, the founder of the Sisters of Providence of Montreal, to be Venerable (the second of the four stages of Catholic sainthood). He would beatify her on October 7, 2001.
- U.S. President Bill Clinton instructed his attorney, David E. Kendall, to turn over to the United States Department of Justice all records related to Clinton's investment in Whitewater Development Corporation, including the documents White House Counsel Bernard Nussbaum removed from Vince Foster's office after Foster's July 20 suicide.
- Debbie Tucker Loveless and John Harvey Miller, who had both been serving life prison sentences, were released on bond after their convictions for the alleged murder of Loveless' 4-year-old daughter in January 1989 were overturned the previous week. The Texas Court of Criminal Appeals overturned the convictions due to the couple having ineffective counsel and the failure of the prosecution to turn over medical records to the defense. Loveless and Miller maintained that the child died as a result of a dog attack and that their first attorney ignored evidence supporting their explanation. Prosecutors would dismiss the charges against Loveless and Miller on May 2, 1994.
- National Football League quarterback Troy Aikman agreed to an eight-year, $50 million contract with the Dallas Cowboys, making him the richest player in NFL history up to that time.
- Born:
  - Claudio Baeza, Chilean footballer; in Los Ángeles, Chile
  - Felix Großschartner, Austrian cyclist; in Wels, Austria
  - Ruriko Kojima, Japanese gravure idol and sportscaster; in Ichihara, Chiba, Japan
  - Riho Otake, Japanese volleyball player; in Yokohama, Kanagawa Prefecture, Japan
  - Emmanuel Stockbroekx, Belgian Olympic field hockey player; in Brasschaat, Belgium
  - Nicolae Tanovițchii, Moldovan professional racing cyclist; in Chișinău, Moldova
  - Jasmine Todd, American track and field athlete; in San Diego, California
  - Delano Williams, British Olympic sprinter; in Grand Turk Island, Turks and Caicos Islands
- Died:
  - Gertrude Blom, 92, Swiss journalist, social anthropologist and documentary photographer
  - James Ellison (born James Ellison Smith), 83, American actor, fall
  - Jean Maréchal, 83, French racing cyclist
  - Marcello Neri, 91, Italian Olympic cyclist

== December 24, 1993 (Friday) ==
- Two crocodiles attacked and killed 48-year-old Cassey Bond while he was swimming in the Jardine River on the Cape York Peninsula in Far North Queensland, Australia.
- Five shoppers were killed and 48 others wounded in a grenade explosion at a market in Misamis Occidental, Philippines.
- During a family Christmas Eve supper in Montauban, France, a table exploded, piercing a man's neck artery with a shard of glass and causing him to bleed to death.
- In the 1993 John Hancock Bowl, played at the Sun Bowl in El Paso, Texas, the Oklahoma Sooners defeated the Texas Tech Red Raiders by a score of 41–10.
- Born: Mariya Nishiuchi, Japanese model, actress and singer-songwriter; in Fukuoka, Japan
- Died:
  - Dorothea Parker, 65, New Zealand sprinter, cancer
  - Norman Vincent Peale, 95, American preacher and writer, stroke
  - Sveinbjörn Beinteinsson, 69, Icelandic Modern Pagan religious leader, heart failure
  - Yen Chia-kan, 88, Taiwanese politician and 2nd President of the Republic of China

== December 25, 1993 (Saturday) ==
- The new Constitution of Russia came into effect upon its publication.
- Queen Elizabeth II spoke of the year's progress towards peace in Northern Ireland in her Royal Christmas Message to the United Kingdom.
- A 59-year-old woman identified by the press as "Jennifer F." gave birth to twins at a hospital in London, occasioning controversy and comment across Europe.
- In the 1993 Aloha Bowl, played at Aloha Stadium in Honolulu, Hawaii, the Colorado Buffaloes defeated the Fresno State Bulldogs by a score of 41–30.
- Born:
  - Leonardo Basso, Italian cyclist; in Castelfranco Veneto, Italy
  - Ariadna Gutiérrez, Colombian actress, television host, and model, Miss Colombia 2014; in Sincelejo, Sucre Department, Colombia
  - Emi Takei, Japanese actress, fashion model, and singer; in Nagoya, Japan
- Died:
  - Pierre Victor Auger, 94, French physicist
  - Ama Naidoo OLS (born Manonmoney Pillay), 85, South African anti-apartheid activist, heart failure
  - Jeff Phillips, 30, American professional skateboarder, suicide by gunshot
  - Nikolai Timkov, 81, Soviet Russian painter

== December 26, 1993 (Sunday) ==
- The 1993 Sydney to Hobart Yacht Race began. It would conclude on January 3, 1994.
- Grenade attacks occurred at the Roman Catholic Davao Cathedral and at a Muslim mosque in Davao City, Philippines. At least six people were killed and more than 130 wounded in the first incident, while there were no casualties in the second one.
- Actress Marlene Dietrich's grave in Berlin, Germany, was desecrated and covered with feces the day before what would have been her 92nd birthday.
- Born: Taleni Seu, New Zealand rugby union player; in Auckland, New Zealand

== December 27, 1993 (Monday) ==
- Israeli soldiers in southern Lebanon, mistaking a United Nations patrol for a guerrilla group, killed one Norwegian soldier and wounded another.
- Career criminal Roger Hoan Brady shot and killed Officer Martin L. Ganz of the Manhattan Beach, California Police Department during a traffic stop. Ganz's 12-year-old nephew, who was on a ride-along with him, was unharmed.
- Ted Turner was named the most powerful man in sports according to The Sporting News.
- Born: Olivia Cooke, English actress; in Oldham, Greater Manchester, England
- Died:
  - Michael Callen, 38, American singer, composer, author and AIDS activist; AIDS-related complications of pulmonary Kaposi's sarcoma
  - Feliks Kibbermann, 91, Estonian chess master and philologist
  - Evald Mikson, 82, Estonian footballer, police officer and war criminal
  - André Pilette, 75, Belgian racing driver

== December 28, 1993 (Tuesday) ==
- In New York state, four out of six parcel bombs sent to family members of Brenda Lazore, the ex-girlfriend of Michael Stevens, exploded, killing five people. Lazore's mother, stepfather and sister, a coworker of her stepfather and a friend of her sister were all killed; her uncle was injured. Two other bombs sent to family members were intercepted by police. Stevens and his friend Earl Figley would be charged in the bombings on December 29.
- In the 1993 Liberty Bowl, played at Liberty Bowl Memorial Stadium in Memphis, Tennessee, the Louisville Cardinals defeated the Michigan State Spartans by a score of 18–7.
- In Williamson County, Tennessee, American country singer-songwriter Billy Ray Cyrus married Leticia Jean Finley, the mother of his 1-year-old daughter, Destiny Hope Cyrus (later known as Miley Cyrus).
- Canadian singer and songwriter Shania Twain married South African record producer Robert John "Mutt" Lange. They would divorce in 2010.
- Born: Yua Shinkawa, Japanese actress and model; in Saitama Prefecture, Japan
- Died:
  - Alfonso Balcázar, 67, Spanish screenwriter, film director and producer
  - Howard Caine (born Howard Cohen), 65 or 67, American actor, heart attack
  - John Kemp, 53, New Zealand footballer and cricketer
  - William L. Shirer, 89, American journalist and historian

== December 29, 1993 (Wednesday) ==
- Japanese climber Yasuko Namba summitted the Vinson Massif, the tallest mountain in Antarctica, as part of her attempt to climb all Seven Summits. She would die in the 1996 Mount Everest disaster.

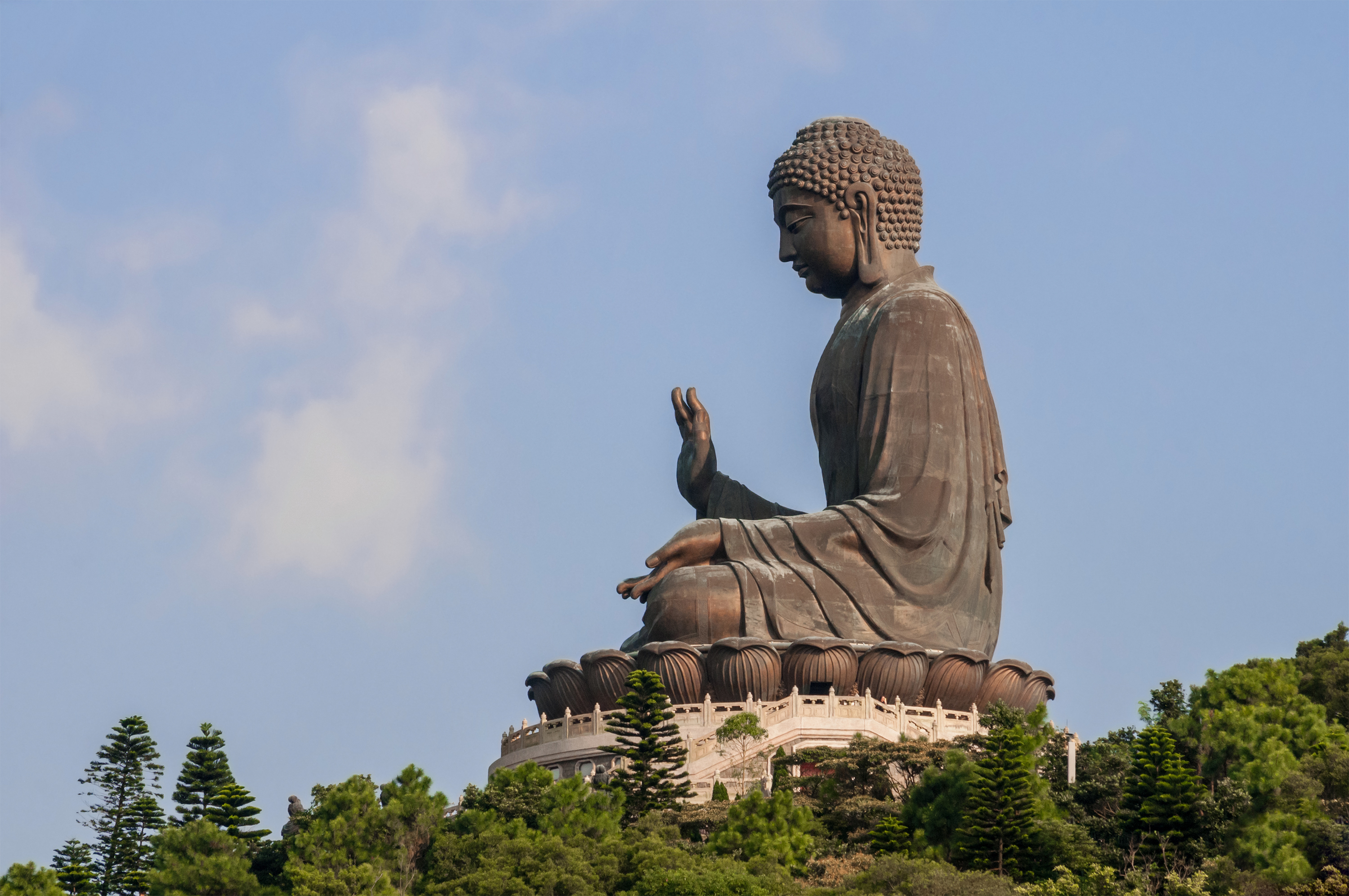
The Big Buddha (photographed in June 2013).

- The Big Buddha, a 112-foot (34 m) tall bronze statue, was dedicated on Lantau Island in Hong Kong. At that time it was the largest outdoor bronze Buddha statue in the world.
- 31-year-old French footballer Pierre Bianconi, a Corsican nationalist, disappeared. His car was found at the port of Bastia, Corsica.
- The Irish Republican Army released a New Year's message making no mention of a ceasefire, indicating uncertainty about the Downing Street Declaration issued on December 15.
- Alberto Fujimori, the President of Peru, signed the new Constitution of Peru in Lima.
- 9-year-old Joey Jacobs of Chester Township, Geauga County, Ohio, lost both ears while holding off a Rottweiler attacking two younger children. The dog had run over a buried-wire fence produced by Invisible Fence Inc. to attack them.
- In the 1993 Copper Bowl, played at Arizona Stadium in Tucson, Arizona, the Kansas State Wildcats defeated the Wyoming Cowboys by a score of 52–17.
- Born:
  - Travis Head, Australian international cricketer; in Adelaide, South Australia
  - Gabby May, Canadian artistic gymnast; in Winnipeg, Manitoba, Canada
- Died:
  - Marie Kean, 75, Irish actress
  - Frunzik Mkrtchyan, 63, Armenian stage and film actor

== December 30, 1993 (Thursday) ==
- The Congress Party gained a parliamentary majority in India after the defection of 10 Janata Dal party lawmakers.
- In Jerusalem, representatives of Israel and the Holy See signed the Fundamental Agreement Between the Holy See and the State of Israel, preparing for the establishment of diplomatic relations.
- Three operatives of the Azanian People's Liberation Army opened fire at the Heidelberg Tavern in Observatory, Cape Town, South Africa, killing four students.
- 23-year-old British Army soldier Daniel Blinco was shot and killed by an Irish Republican Army sniper during an Army foot patrol in Crossmaglen, County Armagh, Northern Ireland.
- Argentina passed a measure allowing President Carlos Menem and all future presidents to run for a second consecutive term. It also shortened presidential terms to four years and removed the requirement for the president to be Roman Catholic.
- In the 1993 Freedom Bowl, played at Anaheim Stadium in Anaheim, California, the USC Trojans defeated the Utah Utes by a score of 28–21.
- In the 1993 Holiday Bowl, played at Jack Murphy Stadium in San Diego, California, the Ohio State Buckeyes defeated the BYU Cougars, also by a score of 28–21.
- Died:
  - İhsan Sabri Çağlayangil, 84–85, Turkish diplomat and politician
  - Irving Paul Lazar, 86, American talent agent
  - Giuseppe Occhialini, 86, Italian physicist

== December 31, 1993 (Friday) ==
- In the 1993 Peach Bowl (December), played at the Georgia Dome in Atlanta, Georgia, the Clemson Tigers defeated the Kentucky Wildcats by a score of 14–13.
- In the 1993 Gator Bowl, played at Gator Bowl Stadium in Jacksonville, Florida, the Alabama Crimson Tide defeated the North Carolina Tar Heels by a score of 24–10.
- In the 1993 Independence Bowl, played at Independence Stadium in Shreveport, Louisiana, the Virginia Tech Hokies defeated the Indiana Hoosiers by a score of 45–20.
- In the inaugural edition of the Alamo Bowl, played at the Alamodome in San Antonio, Texas, the California Golden Bears defeated the Iowa Hawkeyes by a score of 37–3.
- In Pampa, Texas, Twila Busby was strangled and bludgeoned to death and her two adult sons, Randy Busby and Elwin Caler, were stabbed to death. Busby's live-in boyfriend, Hank Skinner, would be convicted of the murders in 1995 and sentenced to death.
- Born:
  - Ryan Blaney, American race car driver; in Hartford Township, Trumbull County, Ohio
  - Dave Richards, Welsh footballer; in Abergavenny, Wales
- Died:
  - Zviad Gamsakhurdia, 54, Georgian politician, 1st President of Georgia, gunshot to head
  - Brandon Teena, 21, American murder victim, was killed along with Lisa Lambert and Phillip DeVine in Humboldt, Nebraska. Teena's story would later become the basis for the film Boys Don't Cry.
  - Thomas J. Watson Jr., 79, American businessman, political figure, and philanthropist, complications from a stroke
