= Joy (novels) =

Joy is a series of semi-autobiographical erotic novels by Joy Laurey, the pen name of French writer Jean-Pierre Imbrohoris. The character is a supermodel whose father is American and mother is French.

The books have been adapted as movies and TV miniseries.

== Novels ==
- Joy (1981)
- Joy and Joan (1982)
- Joy in Love ISBN 0-352-31836-8
- The Return of Joy

Joy (the first in the series) - DVD cover

== Movies ==
- Joy (1983) with Claudia Udy as Joy
- Joy and Joan (1985) with Brigitte Lahaie as Joy and Isabelle Solar as Joan
- Joy in Love (TV miniseries) with Zara Whites as Joy
  - Joy in Hong Kong (1992)
  - Joy in Moscow (1992)
  - Joy in Africa (1992)
  - Joy in San Francisco (1992)
- Joy and the Pharaohs (1993) with Zara Whites as Joy
