= Joy Laurey =

French writer

Joy Laurey is the pen name of a French writer, Jean-Pierre Imbrohoris (6 August 1943 - 13 December 1993), who wrote a series of erotic novels called Joy. They were adapted into several films with actresses such as Claudia Udy, Brigitte Lahaie and Zara Whites. He died in a car accident in southern France which also killed his wife, his son and novelist Vanessa Duriès.

== Bibliography ==
=== As Joy Laurey ===
- Joy (1981)
- Joy and Joan (1982)
- Joy in Love ISBN 0-352-31836-8
- Jessica (1997)
- The return of Joy

=== As Jean-Pierre Imbrohoris ===
- Marion du Faouët
- Toute la vérité
