= November 1993 =

Month in 1993

<<	November 1993					>>
Su	Mo	Tu	We	Th	Fr	Sa
	1	2	3	4	5	6
7	8	9	10	11	12	13
14	15	16	17	18	19	20
21	22	23	24	25	26	27
28	29	30

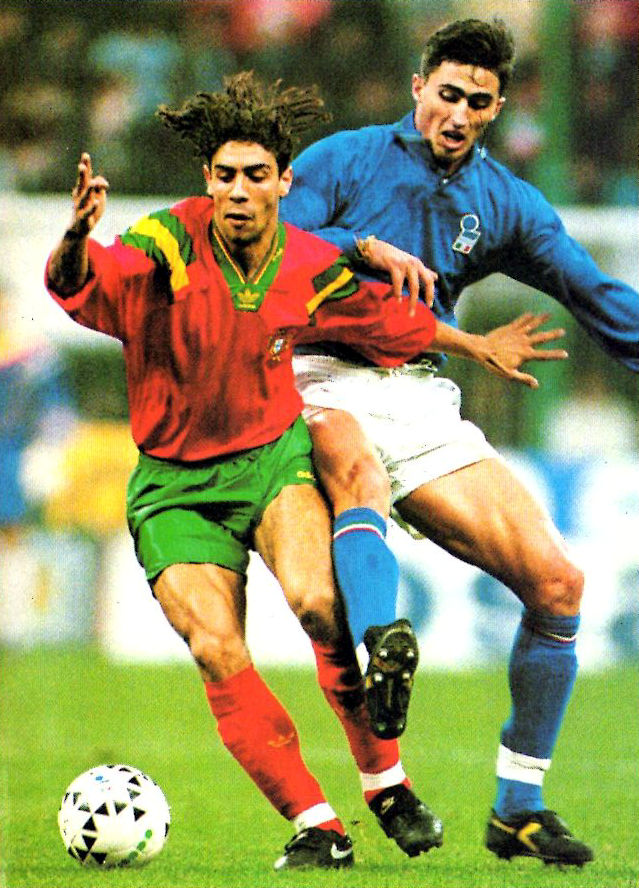
November 17, 1993: FIFA World Cup qualification: Italy v Portugal, Dino Baggio (right) and Rui Costa.

November 1993 was the eleventh month of that common year. The month which began on a Monday and ended after 30 days on a Tuesday.

The following events occurred in November 1993. For a more complete listing of notable deaths this month, see Deaths in November 1993.

== Monday, November 1, 1993 ==
- The Maastricht Treaty took effect, formally establishing the European Union.
- The British Women's Royal Naval Service was absorbed into the Royal Navy.
- The trial began of the two alleged killers in the February 12 abduction and murder of James Bulger, a two-year-old British boy.

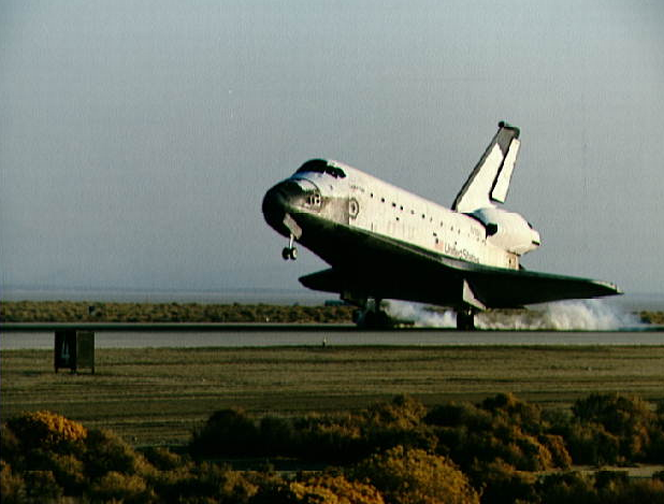
November 1, 1993: Landing of STS-58.

- Space Shuttle Columbia landed at Edwards Air Force Base, California, at 7:05 a.m. PST, completing the STS-58 mission.
- Born:
  - Saleh Al-Shehri, Saudi Arabian footballer; in Jeddah, Saudi Arabia
  - Chizuru Arai, Japanese Olympic champion judoka; in Yorii, Saitama, Japan
  - Marko Bakić, Montenegrin footballer; in Budva, Federal Republic of Yugoslavia
  - Krystyna Freda, American-born Cypriot footballer
  - Marvin Gakpa, French footballer; in Dunkirk, France
  - Afa Ismail, Maldivian Olympic sprinter; in Malé, Maldives
  - Sean Kelly, Scottish footballer; in Glasgow, Scotland
  - Pat O'Connor, National Football League defensive end; in Evergreen Park, Illinois
  - Richard Ofori, Ghanaian footballer
  - Laura Pugh, Australian rules footballer
  - Iván Rossi, Argentine footballer; in Castelar, Buenos Aires Province, Argentina
  - Daniel Wilson, Guyana footballer; in Georgetown, Guyana
- Died: Severo Ochoa, 88, Spanish physician and biochemist, recipient of the Nobel Prize in Physiology or Medicine

== Tuesday, November 2, 1993 ==
- 30-year-old Protestant Brian Woods, a member of the Royal Ulster Constabulary, died two days after being shot by an Irish Republican Army sniper at a vehicle checkpoint in Newry, County Down.
- In the 1993 New York City mayoral election, Republican Rudy Giuliani defeated incumbent Democrat David Dinkins for the position of Mayor of New York City.
- Two U.S. states voted to elect governors. In the 1993 New Jersey gubernatorial election, Republican Christine Todd Whitman defeated incumbent Democrat James Florio for the position of Governor of New Jersey. In the 1993 Virginia gubernatorial election, Republican U.S. Representative George Allen defeated Democrat Mary Sue Terry, the former Attorney General of Virginia, for the position of Governor.
- Born:
  - Katsyaryna Andreeva, Belarusian journalist; in Minsk, Belarus
  - Tobias Borg, Swedish professional basketball player; in Södertälje, Sweden
  - Ignacio Caroca, Chilean footballer; in Curicó, Chile
  - Harvey Dixon, Gibraltarian middle-distance runner; in Nice, France
  - Marianne Fortier, Canadian actress; in Val-Bélair, Quebec, Canada
  - Edoardo Goldaniga, Italian footballer; in Milan, Italy
  - Ryan Ingraham, Bahamian high jumper
  - Dimitrios Kourbelis, Greek footballer; in Korakovouni, Arcadia, Greece
  - Dražen Luburić, Serbian volleyball player; in Novi Sad, Republic of Serbia, Federal Republic of Yugoslavia
  - Nico Müller, German Olympic weightlifter; in Mosbach, Baden-Württemberg, Germany
  - Víctor Ruiz, Spanish footballer; in Valencia, Spain

== Wednesday, November 3, 1993 ==
- In Chicago, Illinois, the partial collapse of a post office building under construction killed two construction workers and injured five.
- The prototype for Sonic The Hedgehog 3 was created.
- Born:
  - Ezgi Dağdelenler, Turkish volleyball player; in Ankara, Turkey
  - Rodrigo Ely, Brazilian footballer; in Lajeado, Rio Grande do Sul, Brazil
  - Kenny Golladay, National Football League wide receiver; in Chicago, Illinois
  - Josh Griffiths, Welsh marathon runner
  - Kaleena Mosqueda-Lewis (born Kaleena Jordan Lewis), American professional basketball player; in Pomona, California
  - George Odum, National Football League safety; in Millington, Tennessee
  - Martina Trevisan, Italian tennis player; in Florence, Italy
- Died: Leon Theremin (born Lev Sergeyevich Termen), 97, Russian and Soviet inventor of the theremin

== Thursday, November 4, 1993 ==
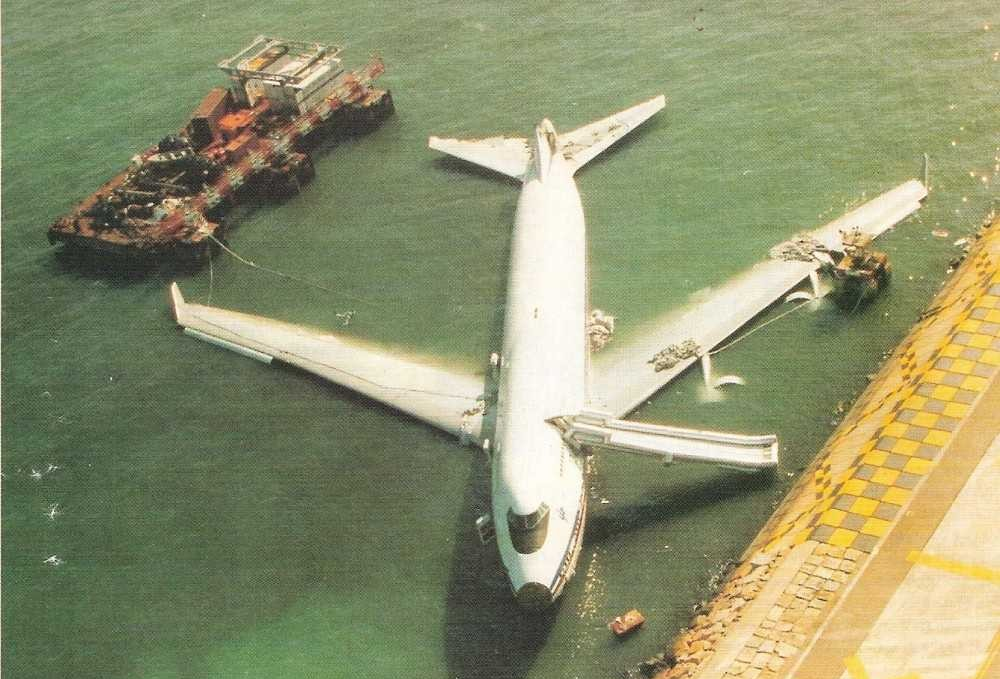
November 4, 1993: China Airlines aircraft after accident.

- China Airlines Flight 605, a brand-new 747-400, overran the runway at Kai Tak Airport in Hong Kong; there were no fatalities.
- Jean Chrétien became the 20th Prime Minister of Canada.
- The National Basketball Association awarded its 28th franchise to Toronto. The new team would be named the Toronto Raptors in May 1994.
- Born:
  - Michael Gogl, Austrian cyclist; in Gmunden, Upper Austria, Austria
  - Julien Laporte, French footballer; in Clermont-Ferrand, France
  - Moira Dela Torre, Filipino singer-songwriter
  - Luo Jing, Chinese footballer; in Guiyang, Guizhou, China
  - Obinna Oleka, American professional basketball player; in Washington, D.C.
  - Andrus Peat, National Football League guard; in Mesa, Arizona
  - Alejandro Peñaranda, Colombian footballer; in Jamundí, Colombia (d. 2018, shot)
  - Elisabeth Seitz, German Olympic artistic gymnast; in Heidelberg, Baden-Württemberg, Germany
  - Jordan Smith, American singer and songwriter; in Whitley County, Kentucky
  - Drew Starkey, American actor; in Hickory, North Carolina

== Friday, November 5, 1993 ==
- The Parliament of the United Kingdom passed the Railways Act 1993, setting out the procedures for privatisation of British Rail.
- Born:
  - Ignacio González (born Juan Ignacio González Brazeiro), Uruguayan footballer; in Paysandú, Uruguay
  - Jesús Jiménez, Spanish footballer; in Leganés, Spain
  - Shy Martin (born Sara Hjellström), Swedish singer and songwriter; in Lerdala, Sweden
  - Leila Mimmack, English actress; in Leamington Spa, Warwickshire, England
  - Mbagnick Ndiaye, Senegalese Olympic judoka
  - Stoichkov (born Juan Diego Molina Martínez), Spanish footballer; in Los Barrios, Spain
  - Hideya Tawada, Japanese actor and model; in Osaka Prefecture, Japan

== Saturday, November 6, 1993 ==
- The 1993 New Zealand general election was held.
- The Riddick Bowe vs. Evander Holyfield II boxing match was held at Caesars Palace in Paradise, Nevada. Holyfield won by majority decision. During Round 7 of the fight, parachutist James Miller crashed his paraglider into the side of the ring; he was knocked unconscious by fans and security and taken to a local hospital.
- Born:
  - Rebeka Abramovič, Slovenian basketball player; in Ljubljana, Slovenia
  - Toni Datković, Croatian footballer; in Zagreb, Croatia
  - Thalita de Jong, Dutch cyclist; in Bergen op Zoom, North Brabant, Netherlands
  - Carina Doyle, Australian-born New Zealand Olympic swimmer; in Darwin, Northern Territory, Australia
  - Dearica Hamby, American professional basketball player
  - Ryuji Izumi, Japanese footballer; in Yokkaichi, Mie Prefecture, Japan
  - Ante Majstorović, Croatian footballer; in Zagreb, Croatia
  - Fausto Masnada, Italian cyclist; in Bergamo, Italy
  - Emmanuel Ogbah, Nigerian-American National Football League defensive end; in Lagos, Nigeria
  - Héctor Sáez, Spanish cyclist; in Caudete, Castilla–La Mancha, Spain
  - Joe Schobert, National Football League linebacker; in Waukesha, Wisconsin
  - Dominik Starkl, Austrian footballer; in Sankt Pölten, Austria
  - Isaac Viñales, Spanish motorcycle racer; in Llançà, Spain
  - Josh Wakefield, English footballer; in Frimley, Surrey, England
  - Erdoğan Yeşilyurt, Turkish-German footballer; in Euskirchen, Germany

== Sunday, November 7, 1993 ==
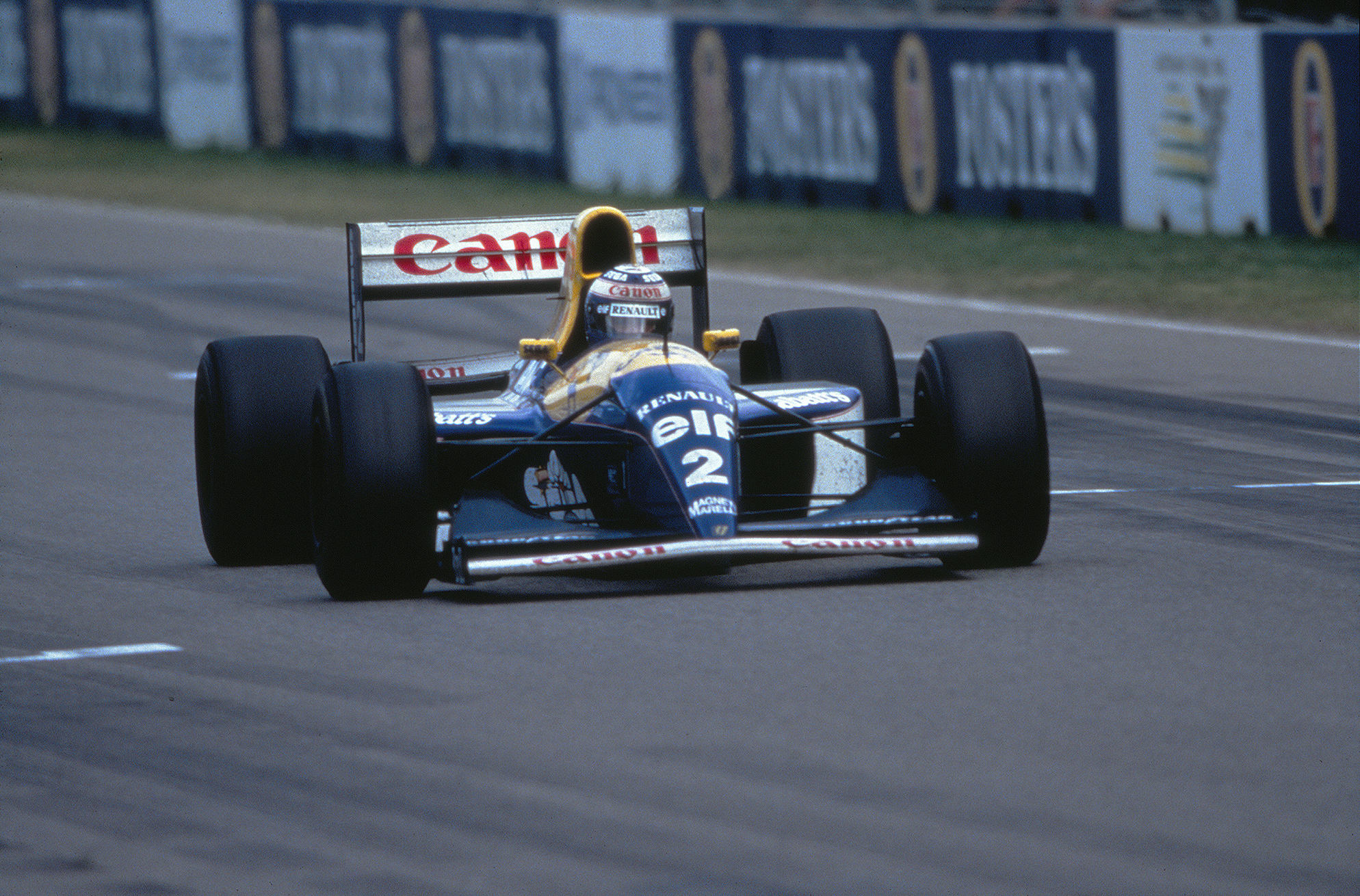
November 7, 1993: Alain Prost during his final Formula One race.

- Ayrton Senna won the 1993 Australian Grand Prix at Adelaide Street Circuit. This would prove to be the last race Senna finished before his death on May 1, 1994. It was also Alain Prost's final Formula One Grand Prix before his retirement; Senna embraced his longtime rival on the award podium.
- Born:
  - Charity Adule, Nigerian footballer; in Warri, Delta State, Nigeria
  - Claudiu Belu, Romanian footballer; in Timișoara, Romania
  - Dóra Bodonyi, Hungarian Olympic champion sprint canoeist; in Szarvas, Hungary
  - Jürgen Locadia, Dutch footballer; in Emmen, Netherlands
  - Arthur Masuaku (born Fuka-Arthur Masuaku Kawela), French footballer; in Lille, France
  - Ronen Rubinstein, Israeli-American actor, writer, director and singer; in Rehovot, Israel
  - Tan Ya-ting, Taiwanese Olympic archer; in Hsinchu, Taiwan
  - Stefano Tonut, Italian professional basketball player; in Cantù, Italy
- Died:
  - Adelaide Hall, 92, American jazz singer and entertainer, old age
  - Terris Moore, 85, American explorer and mountaineer, president of the University of Alaska, heart attack

== Monday, November 8, 1993 ==
- In the early morning hours, burglars lowered themselves through the roof of the Moderna Museet in Stockholm, Sweden, to commit a $52 million robbery, stealing five paintings and a sculpture by Pablo Picasso and two paintings by Georges Braque. After negotiating with the thieves for a year, the museum would recover all of the Picasso paintings and one of the Braque paintings.
- Born:
  - Cody Arens, American actor; in Richmond, Vermont
  - Bence Batik, Hungarian footballer; in Szeged, Hungary
  - Felipe Campos, Chilean footballer; in Santiago, Chile
  - Kevin Giovesi, Italian racing driver; in Rho, Lombardy, Italy
  - Maryna Ivashchanka, Belarusian basketball player; in Rechytsa, Belarus
  - Sinead Jack, Trinidad and Tobago volleyball player; in Mount Hope, Trinidad and Tobago
  - Livio Jean-Charles, French professional basketball player; in Cayenne, French Guiana, France
  - Przemek Karnowski, Polish professional basketball player; in Bydgoszcz, Poland
  - Fraser Mullen, Scottish footballer; in Glasgow, Scotland
  - Emil Nielsen, Danish footballer; in Store Merløse, Denmark
  - Santeri Paloniemi, Finnish Olympic alpine skier; in Kuusamo, Finland
  - Song Ui-young, South Korean-born Singaporean footballer; in Incheon, South Korea
  - Lauren Young, Filipino-American actress; in Alexandria, Virginia

== Tuesday, November 9, 1993 ==
- The Special Tactics and Rescue Unit of the Singapore Police Force was commissioned.
- Bosnian Croat forces destroyed the Stari Most, or Old Bridge of Mostar, Bosnia and Herzegovina, by tank fire.
- Born:
  - Semi Ajayi (born Oluwasemilogo Adesewo Ibidapo Ajayi), English footballer; in Crayford, England
  - Halil Akbunar, Turkish footballer; in Konak, İzmir, Turkey
  - Ultan Dillane, Irish rugby union player; in Paris, France
  - Pete Dunne (born Peter Thomas England), English professional wrestler and promoter; in Birmingham, England
  - Satyawart Kadian, Indian wrestler; in Rohtak, Haryana, India
  - Bantu Mzwakali, South African footballer; in Cape Town, South Africa
- Died: Stanley Myers, 63, British film composer, cancer

== Wednesday, November 10, 1993 ==
- The Parliament of Singapore passed the Fire Safety Act to ensure safety of buildings in the event of fires.
- A bus carrying tourists to Canterbury Cathedral crashed on the M2 motorway in Kent, England, killing the driver and 9 passengers and injuring more than 30.
- Seven climbers and three guides were lost in an avalanche on Chimborazo in Ecuador.
- Born:
  - Simon Adjei, Swedish footballer
  - Mamadama Bangoura, Guinean Olympic judoka
  - Céline Boutier, French professional golfer; in Clamart, France
  - Daieishō Hayato (born Hayato Takanishi), Japanese sumo wrestler; in Asaka, Saitama, Japan
  - Jobby Justin, Indian footballer; in Thiruvananthapuram, Kerala, India
  - Rogen Ladon, Filipino Olympic boxer; in Bago, Negros Occidental, Philippines
  - Ben Malango, Congolese footballer; in Kinshasa, Zaire
  - Srđan Mijailović, Serbian footballer; in Požega, Republic of Serbia, Federal Republic of Yugoslavia
  - Matej Mitrović, Croatian footballer; in Požega, Croatia
  - Ibrahim Moro, Ghanaian footballer; in Accra, Ghana
  - Maodo Nguirane, Senegalese basketball player; in Yeumbeul, Senegal
  - Azusa Tadokoro, Japanese voice actress and singer; in Mito, Ibaraki, Japan
- Died: Alberto Breccia, 74, Argentine comics artist and writer

== Thursday, November 11, 1993 ==
- In Queensland, Australia, a group of people illicitly entered Cape Melville National Park, parking their Toyota Land Cruiser near a stand of foxtail palms, the seeds of which were a valuable commodity at this time. One of the intruders, Paul Barbagallo, was the brother of David Barbagallo, the Principal Private Secretary to Wayne Goss, the Premier of Queensland. Department of Environment and Heritage ranger Pat Shears, suspecting the vehicle's occupants to be smugglers, drove their vehicle to the ranger station at Rinyirru National Park and informed his superior, Peter Stanton. These events would lead to a political scandal known as the "Cape Melville affair".
- The Vietnam Women's Memorial, a sculpture honoring women who served in the Vietnam War, was dedicated at the Vietnam Veterans Memorial in Washington, D.C.
- American actress Teri Garr married John O'Neil; their adopted daughter, Molly O'Neil, was born on the same day. Garr and O'Neil would divorce in 1996.
- Born:
  - Juan Acosta, Uruguayan footballer; in Rocha, Uruguay
  - Simonas Bilis, Lithuanian Olympic swimmer; in Panevėžys, Lithuania
  - Christian Fassnacht, Swiss footballer; in Zürich, Switzerland
  - Giovanni Hiwat, Dutch-Surinamese footballer; in Zwolle, Netherlands
  - Jamaal Lascelles, English footballer; in Derby, England
  - Juan Leiva, Chilean footballer; in Chillán, Chile
  - Federico Morlacchi, Italian Paralympic champion swimmer; in Luino, Italy
  - Connor Pain, Australian footballer; in Sha Tin, Hong Kong
  - Matan Peleg, Guatemalan-Israeli footballer
  - Vicky Piria (born Vittoria Piria), Italian-British racing driver; in Milan, Italy
  - Aleksandar Radovanović, Serbian footballer; in Šabac, Republic of Serbia, Federal Republic of Yugoslavia
  - David Vrankovic, Australian-Serbian footballer; in Sydney

== Friday, November 12, 1993 ==
- London Convention on the Prevention of Marine Pollution by Dumping of Wastes and Other Matter: Marine dumping of radioactive waste was outlawed.
- Born:
  - Musab Al-Battat, Palestinian footballer; in Dhahiriya, Palestine
  - Mackensie Alexander, National Football League cornerback; in Immokalee, Florida
  - Lovro Bizjak, Slovenian footballer; in Šmartno ob Paki, Slovenia
  - Adán Gurdiel, Spanish footballer; in Fabero, Spain
  - Limbikani Mzava, Malawian footballer; in Blantyre, Malawi
  - Kurtis Rowe, New Zealand rugby league player; in Taranaki, New Zealand
  - Monday Samuel (born Samuel Monday Ayinoko Abu), Nigerian-Swedish footballer; in Nigeria
  - James Wilby, British Olympic swimmer; in Glasgow, Glasgow City Region, Scotland
  - Tim Williams, National Football League defensive end; in Baton Rouge, Louisiana
- Died:
  - Bill Dickey, 86, American baseball player
  - H. R. Haldeman, 67, American political aide and businessman, abdominal cancer
  - Vincenzo Li Causi, 40, Italian soldier and secret agent, killed during United Nations Operation in Somalia II
  - Anna Sten, 84, Ukrainian-born American actress

== Saturday, November 13, 1993 ==
- The day after arriving in Cooktown, Queensland, ostensibly in order to visit a cattle station in advance of a visit by Wayne Goss, David Barbagallo and Dennis Atkins, Goss' chief media adviser, accompanied Paul Barbagallo and another of the Cape Melville trespassers, Gordon Uechtritz, to a meeting at the Cooktown police station with a police sergeant and Pat Shears. Shears, who would later claim that Atkins and David Barbagallo "grilled" him at the meeting about his actions on November 11, would be fired two weeks later by the Department of Environment and Heritage.
- China Northern Airlines Flight 6901, a McDonnell Douglas MD-82, crashed on approach to Ürümqi Diwopu International Airport in Xinjiang, China, killing four crewmembers and eight passengers.
- In a regular season college football game between two undefeated teams at Notre Dame Stadium in Indiana, the Notre Dame Fighting Irish defeated the Florida State Seminoles by a score of 31–24. The game was among those named as "Games of the Century".

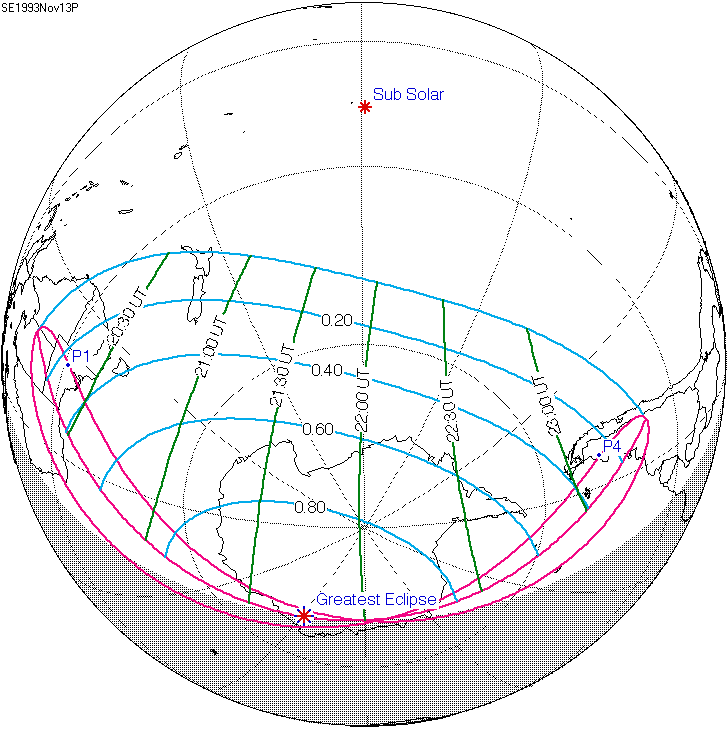
November 13, 1993: Partial solar eclipse.

- A partial solar eclipse was visible on November 13 and 14 in parts of Australia and South America.
- Born:
  - Roger Assalé, Ivorian footballer; in Abengourou, Ivory Coast
  - Maria dela Cruz, Filipino-American footballer; in Cagayan de Oro, Philippines
  - Lautaro Gianetti, Argentine footballer; in San Nicolás, Buenos Aires, Argentina
  - Javontae Hawkins, American professional basketball player; in Flint, Michigan
  - Julia Michaels (born Julia Carin Cavazos), American singer and songwriter; in Davenport, Iowa
  - Georgios Pamlidis, Greek footballer; in Katerini, Greece
  - Giuseppe Prestia, Italian footballer; in Palermo, Italy
  - Nicolas Šumský, Czech footballer; in Hradec Králové, Czech Republic
  - Maud Welzen, Dutch model; in Beek, Netherlands

== Sunday, November 14, 1993 ==
- In a status referendum, residents of Puerto Rico voted by a slim margin to maintain Commonwealth status.
- Andrés Espinosa and Uta Pippig won the men's and women's races of the 1993 New York City Marathon.
- At the Alamodome in San Antonio, Texas, 49-year-old stuntman Randy Hill was killed in front of 16,000 people when "Skycrash", a stunt involving a mid-air collision between two automobiles, went wrong.
- Born:
  - Tabata Amaral, Brazilian political scientist, education activist and politician; in São Paulo, Brazil
  - Marwan Elkamash, Egyptian Olympic swimmer
  - Luis Gil, American soccer player; in Garden Grove, California
  - Eddy Gnahoré, French footballer; in Villeneuve-la-Garenne, Hauts-de-Seine, France
  - Guo Ailun, Chinese professional and Olympic basketball player; in Anshan, Liaoning, China
  - Mats Haakenstad, Norwegian footballer; in Horten, Norway
  - Jackson Hemopo, New Zealand rugby union player; in Whanganui, New Zealand
  - Hymel Hunt, Samoa international rugby league player; in Auckland, Auckland Region, New Zealand
  - Francisco Lindor, Puerto Rican Major League Baseball shortstop; in Caguas, Puerto Rico
  - Shūhei Nomura, Japanese actor; in Kobe, Hyōgo Prefecture, Japan
  - Chris Obekpa, Nigerian professional basketball player; in Makurdi, Nigeria
  - Janieve Russell, Jamaican Olympic track and field athlete; in Manchester Parish, Jamaica
  - Faïz Selemani, French-Comorian footballer; in Marseille, France (some sources give birthdate as November 17, 1993)
  - Mery Spolsky (born Maria Ewa Żak), Polish singer, songwriter and fashion designer; in Warsaw, Poland
  - Samuel Umtiti (born Samuel Yves Um Titi), Cameroonian-French footballer; in Yaoundé, Cameroon
  - Mudo Valdez (born Diego Gabriel Váldez Samudio), Paraguayan footballer; in Asunción, Paraguay
  - Leo Vendrame, Japanese professional and Olympic basketball player; in Chikushino, Fukuoka, Japan
  - Young Chop (born Tyree Lamar Pittman), American record producer, rapper and songwriter; in Chicago, Illinois
- Died: Sanzō Nosaka, 101, Japanese Communist politician, old age

== Monday, November 15, 1993 ==
- In Arizona, a collision between a tractor-trailer and an inmate transfer bus killed the truck driver and Correctional Officer Robert K. Barchey of the Arizona Department of Corrections, who was transporting a prisoner on the bus. All 22 prisoners on the bus were injured, and the bus driver, also a correctional officer, sustained severe injuries that necessitated the amputation of a leg.
- Born:
  - Arik Armstead, National Football League defensive end; in Sacramento, California
  - Abhishek Das, Indian footballer; in Calcutta, West Bengal, India
  - Paulo Dybala, Argentine footballer; in Laguna Larga, Córdoba Province, Argentina
  - Allan Fa'alava'au, New Zealand professional and Olympic rugby union player; in Auckland, New Zealand
  - Saaya Irie, Japanese actress, gravure idol and singer (Sweet Kiss); in Kitakyushu, Fukuoka Prefecture, Japan
  - Mory Konaté, Guinean footballer; in Conakry, Guinea
  - Zvonimir Kožulj, Bosnian footballer; in Ljubuški, Bosnia and Herzegovina
  - Valentina Margaglio, Italian Olympic skeleton racer; in Casale Monferrato, Province of Alessandria, Italy
  - Malkolm Moënza, Swedish footballer; in Gothenburg, Sweden
  - Patrik Poór, Hungarian footballer; in Győr, Hungary
  - Sidney Rivera, Puerto Rican footballer; in Staten Island, New York City
  - Connor Ruane, English footballer; in Manchester, England
  - Melitina Staniouta, Belarusian Olympic individual rhythmic gymnast; in Minsk, Belarus
- Died: Luciano Leggio, 68, Italian mobster, heart attack

== Tuesday, November 16, 1993 ==
- 38-year-old Ian Ashpole set a new altitude record for tightrope walking, crossing a 30-foot (9.1 m) steel bar suspended between two hot air balloons at a height of 11,420 feet (3,480 m). Ashpole fell while crossing the bar in the opposite direction, but survived because he was wearing a parachute.

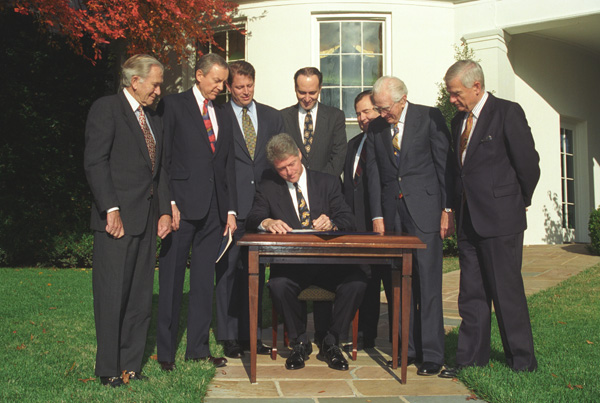
November 16, 1993: Bill Clinton signs the Religious Freedom Restoration Act.

- U.S. President Bill Clinton signed the Religious Freedom Restoration Act. The U.S. Supreme Court would later find it to be unconstitutional as applied to the states.
- Born:
  - Josh Adams, American professional basketball player; in Phoenix, Arizona
  - Bahrudin Atajić, Bosnian-Swedish footballer; in Västervik, Sweden
  - C. J. Beathard, National Football League quarterback; in Franklin, Tennessee
  - Gerry Blakes, American professional basketball player; in Inglewood, California
  - Pete Davidson, American comedian and actor; in Staten Island, New York City
  - Haris Duljević, Bosnian footballer; in Sarajevo, Bosnia and Herzegovina
  - Dakota Earnest, American gymnast; in Lubbock, Texas
  - Anthony Forde, Irish footballer; in Ballingarry, County Limerick, Ireland
  - David Juncà, Spanish footballer; in Riumors, Spain
  - Vaidas Kariniauskas, Lithuanian professional and Olympic basketball player; in Alytus, Lithuania
  - Stefan Küng, Swiss-Liechtensteiner cyclist; in Wil, Canton of St. Gallen, Switzerland
  - Anrich Nortje, South African cricketer; in Uitenhage, Cape Province, South Africa
  - Valentin Onfroy, French Olympic rower; in Verdun, Meuse, France
  - Alexey Rybalkin, Russian cyclist; in Taganrog, Russia
  - Nélson Semedo, Portuguese footballer; in Lisbon, Portugal
  - Ousseynou Thioune, Senegalese footballer; in Kolda, Senegal
  - Denzel Valentine, American professional basketball player; in Lansing, Michigan
- Died:
  - Lucia Popp (born Lucia Poppová), 54, Slovak soprano, brain cancer
  - Evelyn Venable, 80, American actress, cancer

== Wednesday, November 17, 1993 ==
- Final night of the 1994 FIFA World Cup qualification process:
  - Portugal were eliminated in a match against Italy in Milan.
  - Davide Gualtieri scored for San Marino 8.3 seconds into a match against England in Bologna, the fastest goal in World Cup competition up to that time. England won the match by a score of 7–1, but still failed to qualify for the World Cup for the first time since the 1970s.
  - Republic of Ireland qualified with a 1–1 draw in an emotionally fraught match with Northern Ireland in Belfast, still in the grip of the Troubles.
  - Wales were eliminated in a heartbreaking 2–1 loss to Romania at Cardiff Arms Park, their first loss there since 1910. At the end of the match spectator John Hill, a retired postal carrier, was struck in the neck and killed by a flare. The BBC switched their coverage from the England match to the Wales match partway through, prompting numerous telephone calls of complaint. For the first time since 1938, no British side qualified for the World Cup.
  - France were eliminated in a 2–1 home loss to Bulgaria. Bulgaria's Emil Kostadinov scored the winning goal after France's David Ginola attempted to score rather than keeping the ball under control; this sparked a decades-long feud between Ginola and France manager Gérard Houllier, whom Ginola had previously accused of giving other players preferential treatment. Houllier said after the match, "He [Ginola] sent an Exocet missile through the heart of the team."
  - Argentina qualified for the World Cup in the second leg of the OFC–CONMEBOL play-off, played against Australia at Estadio Monumental Antonio Vespucio Liberti in Buenos Aires.
- In Nigeria, General Sani Abacha ousted the government of Ernest Shonekan in a military coup.

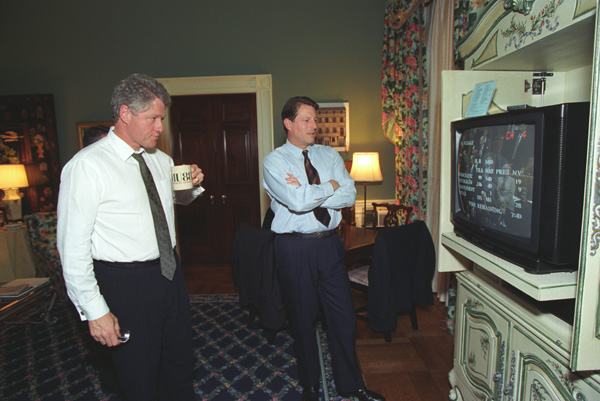
November 17, 1993: Bill Clinton and Al Gore watch results of the NAFTA vote.

- Between November 17 and November 22, the North American Free Trade Agreement (NAFTA) passed the legislative houses in the United States, Canada and Mexico.
- The first meeting of the Asia-Pacific Economic Cooperation summit opened in Seattle, Washington.
- Born:
  - Yohan Boli, French-born Ivorian footballer; in Arras, France
  - Ryan Edwards, Australian footballer; in Singapore
  - Chris Feauai-Sautia, New Zealand rugby union player; in Auckland, New Zealand
  - Taylor Gold, American Olympic half-pipe snowboarder; in Steamboat Springs, Colorado
  - Filip Mitrović, Montenegrin footballer; in Podgorica, Federal Republic of Yugoslavia
  - Gomo Onduku, Nigerian footballer; in Ekeremor, Nigeria
  - CJ Perez (born Christian Jaymar Perez), Filipino professional basketball player; in Kowloon, Hong Kong
  - Dyshawn Pierre, Canadian professional basketball player; in Whitby, Ontario
  - Byron Pringle, National Football League wide receiver; in Tampa, Florida

== Thursday, November 18, 1993 ==
- Shortly after midnight, a minibus carrying students home to Worcestershire, England, from a school trip to London crashed into the rear of a maintenance lorry on the M40 motorway, killing 12 children and their teacher. The BBC stirred controversy by placing the story as the third item on that evening's Nine O'Clock News, with a report on the Queen's Speech to Parliament running first.
- The Grand Prix Museum was inaugurated in Sé, Macau, prior to the 40th Macau Grand Prix.
- Members of the Association of Professional Flight Attendants began a planned 11-day strike against American Airlines, disrupting air travel in the week before Thanksgiving. The strike would end on November 22 after U.S. President Clinton helped negotiate an agreement by the parties to submit to binding arbitration.
- Born:
  - Andreea Aanei, Romanian Olympic weightlifter; in Botoșani, Romania
  - Kyle Adnam, Australian professional basketball player; in Melbourne, Australia
  - Gerald Beverly, American professional basketball player; in Rochester, New York
  - Cody Hollister, National Football League wide receiver; in Bend, Oregon
  - Jacob Hollister, National Football League tight end, twin brother of Cody Hollister; in Bend, Oregon
  - Luuk Koopmans, Dutch footballer; in Oss, North Brabant, Netherlands
  - Cory Littleton, National Football League linebacker; in Spring Valley, San Diego County, California
  - Emma Nilsson, Swedish biathlete; in Grasmark, Sweden
  - Maximiliane Rall, German footballer; in Rottweil, Germany
  - Taiberson (born Taiberson Ruan Menezes Nunes), Brazilian footballer; in Alegrete, Brazil
  - Gianna Woodruff, Panamanian Olympic track and field athlete; in Santa Monica, California
- Died: Fritz Feld, 93, German actor

== Friday, November 19, 1993 ==
- A toy factory fire in Shenzhen, China, killed 87 workers and injures 47.
- In the 1993 Curaçao status referendum, voters favored the option of restructuring the Netherlands Antilles.
- Born:
  - Justin Anderson, American professional basketball player; in Montross, Virginia
  - Marco Chiosa, Italian footballer; in Cirié, Italy
  - Spyros Fourlanos, Greek footballer; in Athens, Greece
  - Kerim Frei, Austrian footballer; in Feldkirch, Vorarlberg, Austria
  - Joey Gallo (born Joseph Nicholas Gallo), American Major League Baseball left fielder; in Henderson, Nevada
  - Lloyd Glasspool, British tennis player; in Redditch, England
  - Amal Knight, Jamaican footballer; in Kingston, Jamaica
  - Alexei Koșelev, Moldovan footballer; in Chișinău, Moldova
  - Cleo Massey, Australian actress; in Launceston, Tasmania, Australia
  - Ooi Tze Liang, Malaysian Olympic diver; in George Town, Penang, Malaysia
  - Justin Simmons, National Football League free safety; in Manassas, Virginia
  - Suso, Spanish footballer; in Algeciras, Province of Cádiz, Spain
  - Cordrea Tankersley, National Football League cornerback; in Beech Island, South Carolina
  - Kelly Zeeman, Dutch footballer; in Amsterdam, Netherlands
- Died: Leonid Gaidai, 70, Soviet comedy director

== Saturday, November 20, 1993 ==
- Comoros joined the Arab League.

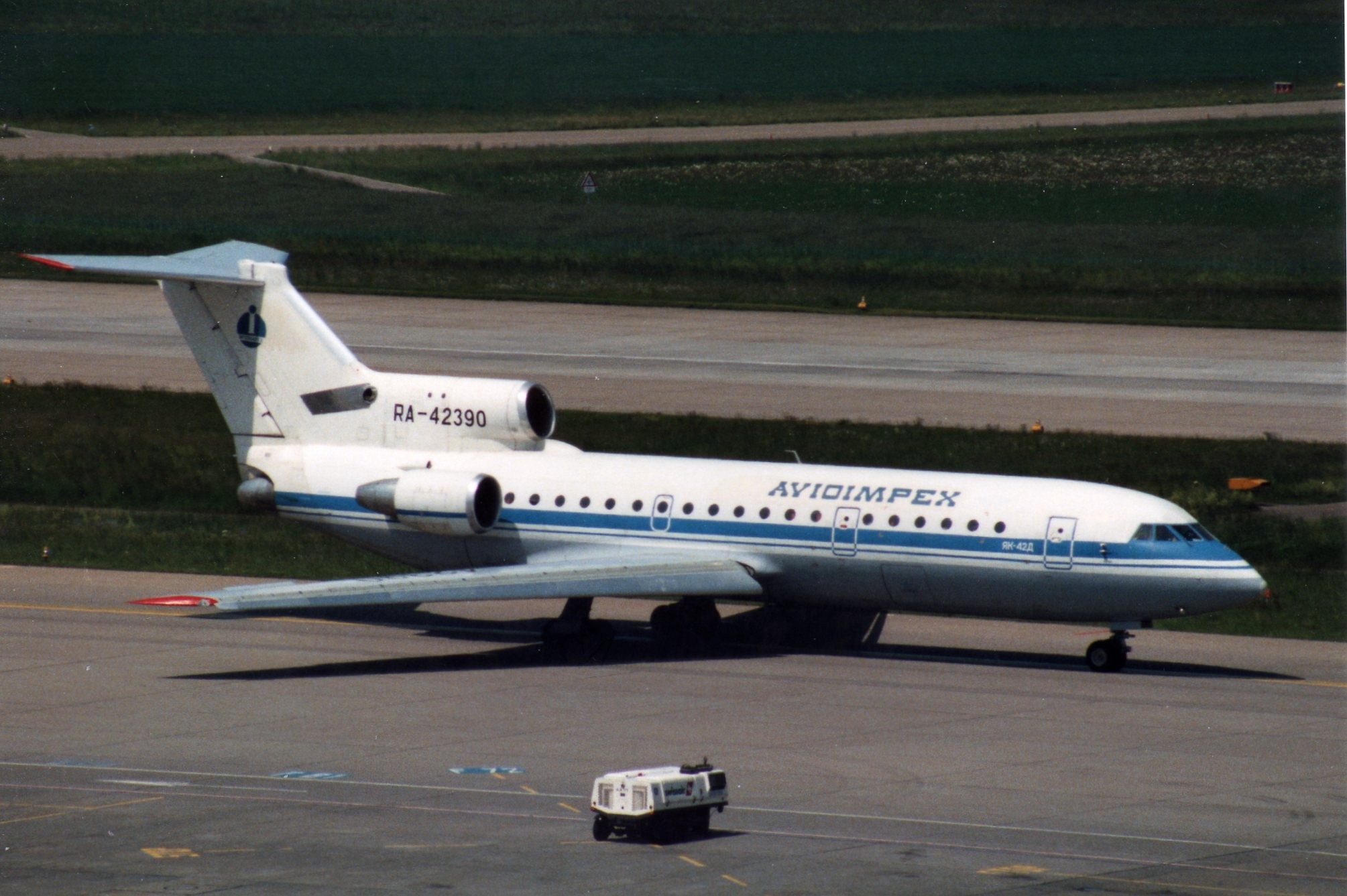
The Avioimpex crash aircraft, photographed on May 20, 1993.

- Avioimpex Flight 110, a Yakovlev Yak-42D, crashed near Trojani near Ohrid, Macedonia, killing all 116 people on board.
- At the 29th Vanier Cup, the 1993 CIAU football championship game, held at the SkyDome in Toronto, the Toronto Varsity Blues defeated the Calgary Dinosaurs by a score of 37–34.
- Born:
  - Man Asaad, Syrian Olympic weightlifter; in Hama, Syria
  - Viviane Asseyi, French footballer; in Mont-Saint-Aignan, Seine-Maritime, France
  - Scott Barrett, New Zealand rugby union player; in New Plymouth, New Zealand
  - Arinze Stanley Egbengwu, Nigerian hyperrealist artist and activist; in Lagos, Nigeria
  - Ella Van Kerkhoven, Belgian footballer; in Leuven, Belgium
  - Junior Paulo, New Zealand rugby league player; in Auckland, Auckland Region, New Zealand
  - Sanjin Prcić, Bosnian footballer; in Belfort, France
  - Anna Prugova, Russian Olympic ice hockey player; in Khabarovsk, Khabarovsk Krai, Russia
  - Sumire Satō, Japanese idol and actress
  - Miloš Stanojević, Serbian footballer; in Valjevo, Republic of Serbia, Federal Republic of Yugoslavia
- Died: Emile Ardolino, 50, American film director, complications from AIDS

== Sunday, November 21, 1993 ==
- A tiger shark attacked and killed pearl diver Richard Bisley off Roebuck Bay, Broome, Western Australia.
- Near Northampton Airport in Massachusetts, a Cherokee Piper Warrior II aircraft crashed, killing all four people aboard, after colliding with skydiver Alfred Peters at an altitude of about 7,500 feet (2,300 m). Peters survived with a broken ankle.
- Born:
  - Georgi Dzhikiya, Russian footballer; in Moscow, Russia
  - Mikhail Markin, Russian footballer; in Kovylkino, Russia
  - Elena Myers, American motorcycle racer; in Mountain View, California
  - Cooper Rush, National Football League quarterback; in Charlotte, Michigan
  - Bojan Sanković, Montenegrin footballer; in Knin, Croatia
  - Patrik Šorm, Czech Olympic sprinter; in Prague, Czech Republic
- Died: Bill Bixby, 59, American actor, cancer

== Monday, November 22, 1993 ==
- Jörg Müller won the 1993 Macau Grand Prix on the Guia Circuit in Macau.
- Americans commemorated the 30th anniversary of the assassination of John F. Kennedy, the 35th President of the United States.
- Born:
  - Saturnin Allagbé (born Owolabi Franck Saturnin Allagbé Kassifa), Beninese footballer; in Assaba Region, Mauritania
  - Thomas Dreßen, German Olympic alpine skier; in Garmisch-Partenkirchen, Bavaria, Germany
  - Adèle Exarchopoulos, French actress; in Paris, France
  - Gettomasa (born Aleksi Lehikoinen), Finnish rapper; in Montreal, Quebec, Canada
  - Isabella Isaksen, American Olympic modern pentathlete; in Fayetteville, Arkansas
  - Mattias Rönngren, Swedish Olympic alpine skier; in Åre, Sweden
  - Marc Soler, Spanish cyclist; in Vilanova i la Geltrú, Spain
  - Dennis Szczęsny, Polish-German handball player; in Dinslaken, North Rhine-Westphalia, Germany
  - Lauren Wade, Northern Irish footballer; in Coleraine, Northern Ireland (some sources give birthdate as November 21, 1993)
  - Zuchu (born Zuhura Othman Soud), Tanzanian singer and songwriter
- Died:
  - Anthony Burgess, 76, English author, lung cancer
  - Joseph Yodoyman, 42–43, Chadian politician, 4th Prime Minister of Chad

== Tuesday, November 23, 1993 ==
- Death Row Records and Interscope Records released Doggystyle, the debut studio album by American rapper Snoop Doggy Dogg.
- Born:
  - Haji Ahmadov, Azerbaijani footballer; in Zaqatala, Azerbaijan
  - Cheikhou Dieng, Senegalese footballer
  - Kevin Londoño, Colombian footballer; in Bello, Antioquia, Colombia
  - Jean-Baptiste Maille, French professional basketball player; in Le Mans, France
  - Jamiro Monteiro, Cabo Verdean footballer; in Rotterdam, Netherlands (some sources give birthdate as November 28, 1993)
  - Faye Njie, Finnish-born Gambian Olympic judoka; in Helsinki, Finland
  - Tim Patrick, National Football League wide receiver; in San Diego, California
  - Julia Sebastián, Argentinean Olympic breaststroke swimmer; in Santa Fe, Argentina
  - Christian Tabó, Uruguayan footballer; in Montevideo, Uruguay

== Wednesday, November 24, 1993 ==
- A jury found 11-year-olds Robert Thompson and Jon Venables guilty of the murder of James Bulger, making them the youngest convicted murderers of the 20th century in the United Kingdom.
- 33-year-old operating engineer Anthony Oddo was killed while working on a water tunnel in Maspeth, Queens, New York City. He was the twentieth man to die working on the same project, which began in 1970. Seven other workers were injured.
- Born:
  - Bryan Acosta, Honduran footballer; in La Ceiba, Honduras
  - Ivi Adamou, Greek Cypriot singer; in Ayia Napa, Cyprus
  - Tayler Adams, New Zealand rugby union player; in Auckland, New Zealand
  - Donervon Daniels, Montserratian footballer; in Plymouth, Montserrat
  - Jasper De Buyst, Belgian professional and Olympic cyclist; in Asse, Belgium
  - Hande Erçel, Turkish actress and model; in Bandırma, Balıkesir Province, Turkey
  - Saoirse-Monica Jackson, Irish actress; in Derry, Northern Ireland
  - Savanah Leaf, British Olympic volleyball player, film director and photographer; in London, Greater London, England
  - Zoe Levin, American actress; in Chicago, Illinois
  - Chelsea Lewis, Welsh netball player; in Merthyr Tydfil, Wales
  - Rauno Nurger, Estonian basketball player; in Keila, Estonia
  - Joe Pigott, English footballer; in Maidstone, Kent, England
  - Fridolina Rolfö, Swedish footballer; in Kungsbacka, Sweden
  - Madison de Rozario, Australian Paralympic champion athlete and wheelchair racer; in Perth, Western Australia
  - Olena Shkhumova, Ukrainian Olympic luger; in Lviv, Lviv Oblast, Ukraine
  - Brandon Starc, Australian Olympic high jumper; in Baulkham Hills, New South Wales, Australia
  - David Walker, American professional basketball player; in Stow, Ohio
- Died: Albert Collins (born Albert Gene Drewery), 61, American blues guitarist and singer, lung cancer

== Thursday, November 25, 1993 ==
- Yemeni kidnappers abducted American diplomat Haynes Mahoney; they would free him on December 1.
- Born:
  - Salum Ageze Kashafali, Norwegian Paralympic champion sprinter; in Goma, Zaire
  - Danny Kent, English motorcycle racer; in Chippenham, Wiltshire, England
  - David Kiki, Beninese footballer; in Vakon, Akpro-Missérété, Benin
  - Yuki Kobori, Japanese Olympic swimmer; in Ishikawa, Fukushima, Japan
  - İsmail Ege Şaşmaz, Turkish actor; in Manisa, Turkey
  - Emily Sonnett, American Olympic and professional soccer player; in Marietta, Georgia

== Friday, November 26, 1993 ==
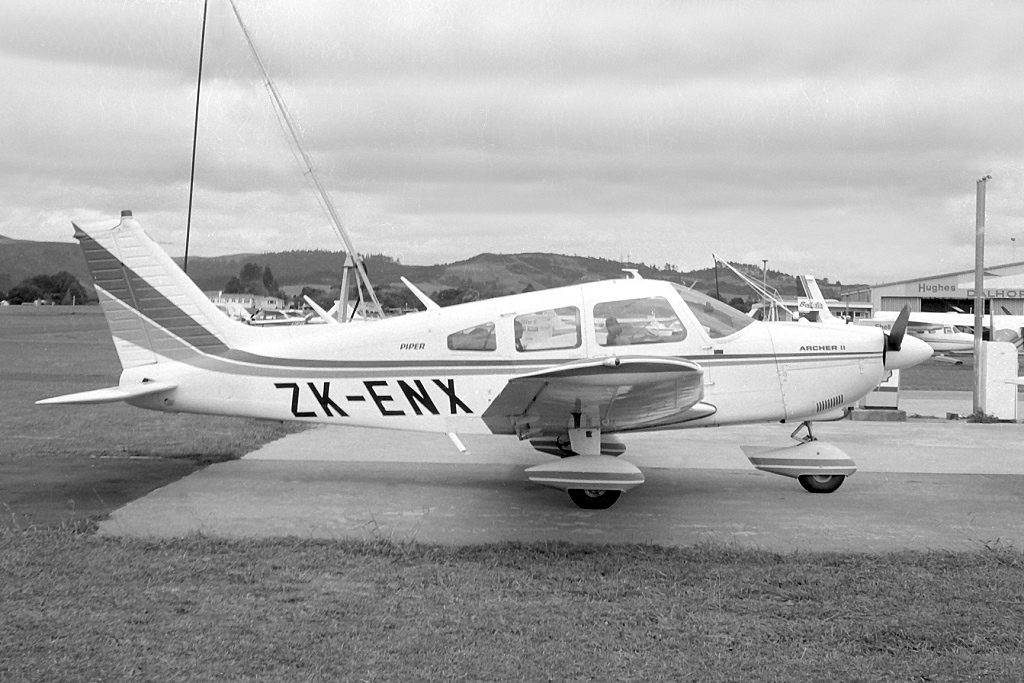
The Piper Archer involved in the Auckland collision prior to the accident.

- In Auckland, New Zealand, a mid-air collision between an Aérospatiale TwinStar police helicopter and a Piper Archer airplane killed four people.
- The BBC aired the first part of Dimensions in Time, the 30th-anniversary Doctor Who special, as part of the Children in Need telethon. The second part would air the following night as part of Noel's House Party.
- The crash of a Marchetti M260 single-engine aircraft in Santa Monica, California, killed student pilots Steven Pollack, the 34-year-old son of film director Sydney Pollack, and 35-year-old David Lyon, and seriously injured their flight instructor.
- Born:
  - Terry Antonis, Australian footballer; in Bankstown, Sydney, Australia
  - Gian Clavell, Puerto Rican professional basketball player; in Caguas, Puerto Rico
  - Georgia Guy, New Zealand cricketer; in Auckland, New Zealand
  - Eron Harris, American professional basketball player; in Indianapolis, Indiana
  - Rhodri Hughes, Welsh rugby union player; in Swansea, Wales
  - Brandie Jay, American artistic gymnast; in Fort Collins, Colorado
  - Marin Jurina, Bosnian footballer; in Livno, Bosnia and Herzegovina
  - Kim Min-tae, South Korean professional and Olympic footballer; in Incheon, South Korea
  - Kuo Hsing-chun, Taiwanese Olympic champion weightlifter; in Yilan City, Taiwan
  - Jordan Loveridge, American professional basketball player; in West Jordan, Utah
  - Kelsey Mitchell, Canadian professional and Olympic champion track cyclist; in Brandon, Manitoba, Canada
  - Erena Ono, Japanese singer (AKB48); in Tokyo, Japan
  - Elizabeth Pelton, American swimmer; in Fairfield, Connecticut
  - Eliana Stábile, Argentine footballer; in Buenos Aires, Argentina

== Saturday, November 27, 1993 ==
- Born:
  - Sion Bennett, New Zealand-born Welsh rugby union player
  - Qëndrim Guri, Kosovan Olympic cyclist; in Ferizaj, Federal Republic of Yugoslavia
  - Toa Halafihi, New Zealand-born Italian rugby union player; in Gisborne, New Zealand
  - Omar Jimenez, American college basketball player, journalist and correspondent; in Worcester, Massachusetts
  - Maor Kandil, Israeli footballer; in Tel Aviv, Israel
  - Joan Kipkemoi, Kenyan long-distance runner; in Kericho, Kenya
  - Ivan Marinković, Serbian professional basketball player; in Belgrade, Republic of Serbia, Federal Republic of Yugoslavia
  - Gonzalo Najar, Argentine cyclist
  - Arne Naudts, Belgian footballer; in Ghent, Belgium
  - Antonio Panfili, Italian figure skater; in Venice, Italy
  - Aubrey Peeples, American actress and singer; in Lake Mary, Florida
  - Feras Shelbaieh, Jordanian footballer; in Amman, Jordan
  - Tutizama Tanito, Solomon Islands footballer
  - Um Vichet, Cambodian footballer; in Phnom Penh, Cambodia
  - Benjamin Verbič, Slovenian footballer; in Celje, Slovenia

== Sunday, November 28, 1993 ==
- The Observer revealed that a channel of communications had existed between the Provisional Irish Republican Army and the British government, despite the government's persistent denials.
- At the 81st Grey Cup, the 1993 Canadian Football League championship game, held at McMahon Stadium in Calgary, Alberta, the West Division champion Edmonton Eskimos defeated the East Division champion Winnipeg Blue Bombers by a score of 33–23.
- Born:
  - Lukhanyo Am, South African rugby union player; in King William's Town, South Africa
  - Samuel Dupratt, American alpine skier
  - Gabriel Graciani, Argentine footballer; in Bovril, Argentina
  - Bryshere Y. Gray, American actor and rapper; in Philadelphia, Pennsylvania
  - David Nofoaluma, Australian-Samoan rugby league player; in Newcastle, New South Wales, Australia
  - Stephanie Park, Canadian paralympic wheelchair basketball player; in Vancouver, British Columbia
- Died: Kenneth Connor, MBE, 75, English comedian, cancer

== Monday, November 29, 1993 ==
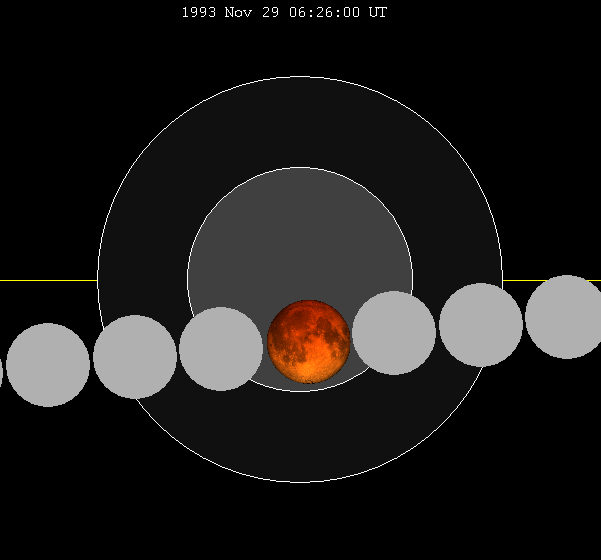
November 29, 1993: Total lunar eclipse.

- A total lunar eclipse took place.
- In Canberra, Australia, 47-year-old Felipe Ruizdiaz shot and wounded swimming pool manager Geoff McGibbon. He then drove his utility vehicle, rigged with petrol and gas canisters, through the front glass wall of the Jolimont Centre, his estranged wife's workplace. After a two-hour siege during which Ruizdiaz threw Molotov cocktails and fired his shotgun at police and rescue workers, he set fire to the building and killed himself.
- The internet ccTLD .ml is designated.
- Born:
  - Stefon Diggs, National Football League wide receiver; in Gaithersburg, Maryland
  - Ernia (born Matteo Professione), Italian rapper (Troupe D'Elite); in Milan, Italy
  - Mina El Hammani, Spanish actress; in Madrid, Spain
  - Jacqueline Janzen, German Olympic ice hockey player; in Villingen-Schwenningen, Baden-Württemberg, Germany
  - Cyrus Jones, National Football League cornerback and return specialist; in Baltimore, Maryland
  - Manuel Lazzari, Italian footballer; in Valdagno, Italy
  - Marcus Martin, National Football League guard; in Los Angeles, California
  - Zoran Marušić, Serbian footballer; in Kraljevo, Republic of Serbia, Federal Republic of Yugoslavia
  - Okomayin Segun Onimisi, Nigerian footballer; in Enugu, Nigeria
  - Giulian Pedone, Swiss motorcycle racer (some sources give birthdate as November 30, 1993); in Neuchâtel, Switzerland
  - Rene Renner, Austrian footballer; in Wels, Austria
  - Yuki Takahashi, Japanese Olympic freestyle wrestler; in Kuwana, Mie, Japan
- Died:
  - Sir Jack Longland, 88, English broadcaster, educator and mountain climber
  - J. R. D. Tata, 89, Indian aviator and businessman, kidney infection

== Tuesday, November 30, 1993 ==
- In Kampala, Uganda, East African heads of state signed an agreement establishing the Permanent Tripartite Commission for East African Co-operation.
- 47-year-old Catholic civilian John Hagan was shot and killed by the Ulster Freedom Fighters as he left his workplace in Dundonald, County Down.

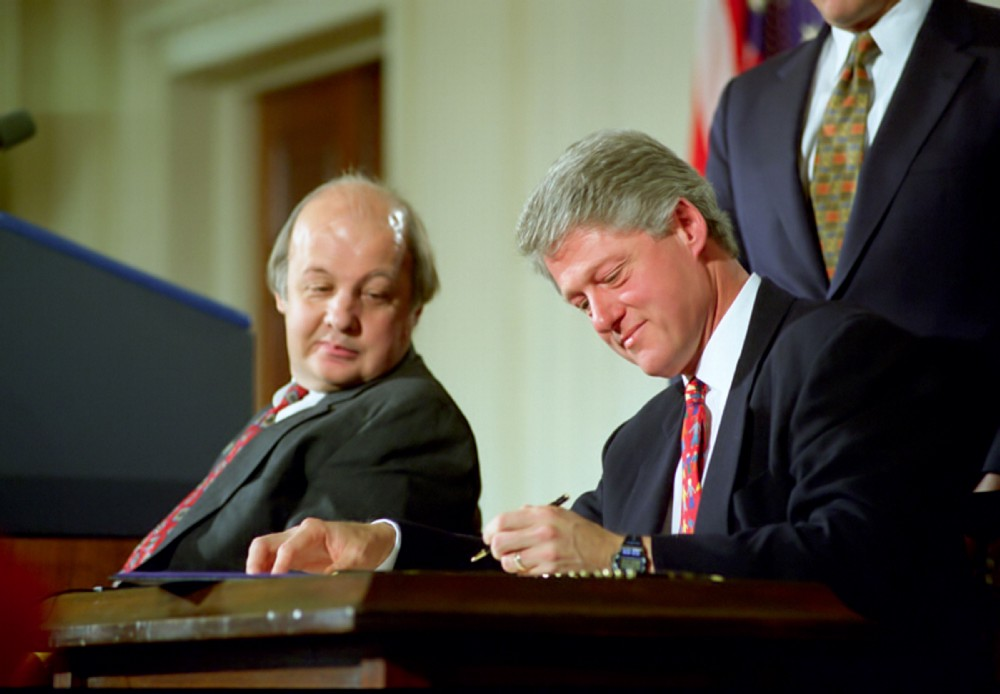
November 30, 1993: Bill Clinton signs the legislation named after James Brady (on left).

- U.S. President Bill Clinton signed the Brady Handgun Violence Prevention Act and legislation permitting women to serve aboard combat vessels in the United States Navy.
- The historical drama film Schindler's List, produced and directed by Steven Spielberg, received its world premiere in Washington, D.C. It would receive the Best Picture and Best Director prizes at the 66th Academy Awards in March 1994.
- Born:
  - Tom Blomqvist, British-born Swedish-New Zealand racing driver; in Cambridge, England
  - Stevie Browning, American professional basketball player
  - Yuri Chinen, Japanese idol
  - Kehri Jones, American bobsledder; in Fort Hood, Texas
  - Tim Leibold, German footballer; in Böblingen, Baden-Württemberg, Germany
  - Lost Frequencies (born Felix De Laet), Belgian DJ and record producer; in the City of Brussels, Belgium
  - Julián Navas, Argentine footballer; in Mendoza, Argentina
  - Seidu Salifu, Ghanaian footballer; in Tamale, Ghana
  - Kevon Seymour, National Football League cornerback; in Pasadena, California
  - Charlie Stemp, English actor; in Peckham, London, England
