= Vanessa Duriès =

French novelist

- Born: Katia Ould-Lamara; 7 February 1972
- Died: 13 December 1993 (aged 21)
- Citizenship: France
- Writing career
- Pen name: Vanessa Duriès
- Subject: BDSM
- Notable work: The Ties That Bind; L'Étudiante

Vanessa Duriès, also known as Katia Lamara (1972 – 13 December 1993), was a French novelist. She was the author of two novels; Le lien and L'Étudiante.

== Biography ==
Cover illustration of Le lien

Duriès was the author of the French BDSM novel Le lien (translated into English as The Ties that Bind) allegedly based on her own experience as a BDSM slave.

She created quite a stir in France at the time of the release of the novel, due to her youth and beauty, and appeared on national television, in particular in the show of Bernard Pivot. She also appeared in a pictorial and interview in the May 1993 issue of the French edition of Penthouse magazine.

Duriès died at the age of 21 in a car crash on 13 December 1993 in the South of France. Because of her early death, she has achieved a cult status for some BDSM communities. In 2007, five chapters of her second novel L'Étudiante, left unfinished due to her death, were published in France.

Three other people also died in the crash. The 2007 edition published in Paris by J'ai Lu which includes an avant-propos by Duriès' editor Franck Spengler and a preface by Florence Dugas, is dedicated: "À la mémoire de Vanessa Duriès, Nathalie Perreau, Jean-Pierre Imbrohoris et leur fils décédés tragiquement le 13 décembre 1993".

Spengler avows he was editor to Nathalie Perreau, also, and a friend of Jean-Pierre Imbrohoris. Published in this edition is a short letter written by Duriès to Franck Spengler, inserted between chapters two and three of "L'Étudiante".

== L'Étudiante ==
L'Étudiante
- Cover art of L'étudiante with a picture of Vanessa Duriès
- Author: Vanessa Duriès
- Language: French
- Genre: Erotic
- Publisher: Blanche
- Publication date: 22 March 2007
- Publication place: France
- Media type: Print (Paperback)
- ISBN: 2-84628-159-9
- Preceded by: Le lien

L'Étudiante is the second novel by Vanessa Duriès.

Like Le lien, Vanessa Duriès's first novel, this is an autobiographical story. It has not been completed, since Vanessa Duriès was killed in a car accident when it was being written.

This second novel puts in parallel her very special kind of sexuality and her life as a student in Bordeaux. As in Le lien, she is very clear and blunt when she describes her BDSM scenes, but she also describes her interest for the quieter love lives of her fellow students, love lives which she pokes fun at but that nevertheless exert some fascination on her, leading her to a clear analysis of the SM milieu.

Although it was written in 1993, it was only published in 2007 in the form of a joint volume with Le Lien by the Éditions Blanche.

The cover image of the book is taken from Vanessa Duriès's pictorial for the French edition of Penthouse.
