= Zara Whites =

Dutch pornographic actress and political activist

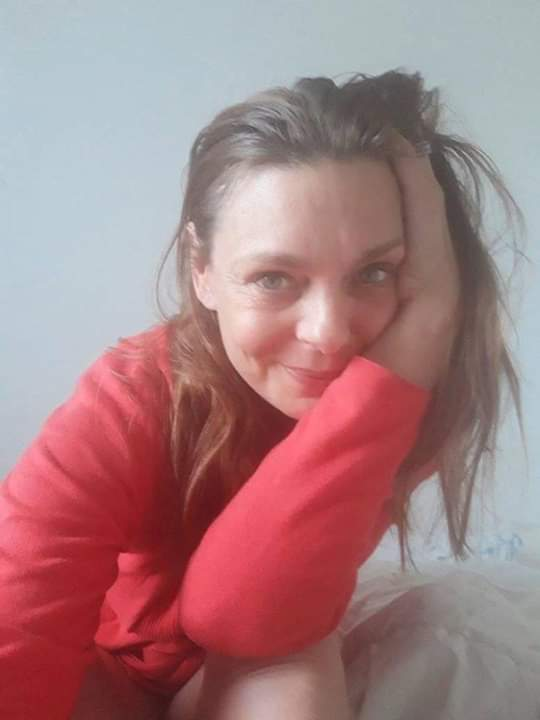
- Whites in 2019
- Born: 1968 (age 56–57) 's-Gravendeel, Hoeksche Waard, Netherlands

Esther Kooiman (born 1968), known professionally as Zara Whites, is a French-Dutch environmental activist and former pornographic film actress.

== Early life ==
Whites was born in Rotterdam in 1968. She dropped out of school at an early age and moved in with her boyfriend when she was 17. In her late teens she worked as a barmaid and at the age of 19, as a prostitute in two men's clubs in Rotterdam.

== Pornographic film career ==
Whites appeared in 27 pornographic films in the 1990s, taking her stage name from White's, a brothel in Rotterdam. In 1992, Whites was briefly married to Italian porn actor Roberto Malone and reoriented her career towards non-sex roles in soft core with a French TV series for M6, Joy. In 1998, she made a comeback with a lesbian hardcore movie, La Dresseuse, directed by Alain Payet.

== Environmental activism ==
She has appeared in various French TV programmes on issues such as the legislative election and vegetarian cuisine.

In 2006, Whites published her autobiography, titled Je suis Zara Whites mais je me soigne ("I am Zara Whites but I'm taking care of myself").

She was nominated for the French electoral campaign of 2007 under the name Esther Spincer. In May 2011, she became national secretary of the green political party Independent Ecological Alliance (AEI).

== Publications ==
- Zara Whites: Ma vie et mes fantasmes (in French). JC Lattès. 1992. ISBN 978-2-7096-1147-3.
- With Ludovic Menguy: Je suis Zara Whites mais je me soigne (in French). Paris: J.-C. Gawsewitch. 2006. ISBN 978-2-35013-054-5.
