= 2006 Australia Day Honours =

Appointment/ Rewards to Australian Citizens

The 2006 Australia Day Honours are appointments to various orders and honours to recognise and reward good works by Australian citizens. The list was announced on 26 January 2006 by the Governor General of Australia, Michael Jeffery.

The Australia Day Honours are the first of the two major annual honours lists, the first announced to coincide with Australia Day (26 January), with the other being the Queen's Birthday Honours, which are announced on the second Monday in June.

== Order of Australia ==
=== Companion (AC) ===
==== General Division ====
| Recipient | Citation | Notes |
|---|---|---|
| Emeritus Professor Charles Ruthven Blackburn ED | For service to the development of academic medicine and medical education in Australia, particularly in relation to the evolving relationship between research and clinical practice, and as a mentor influencing the professional development of a generation of leading health care professionals. | |
| Sister Mary Bernice Elphick AM OBE | For service to medicine and to the community as a pioneer in the development of health care and as a driving force in the success of the multi-disciplinary initiatives established at St Vincent's Private Hospital, Sydney. | |
| Nicole Mary Kidman | For service to the performing arts as an acclaimed motion picture performer, to health care through contributions to improve medical treatment for women and children and advocacy for cancer research, to youth as a principal supporter of young performing artists, and to humanitarian causes in Australia and internationally. | |
| Professor Villis Raymond Marshall | For service to medicine, particularly urology and research into kidney disease, to the development of improved health care services in the Defence forces, and to the community through distinguished contributions to the development of pre-hospital first aid care provided by St John Ambulance Australia. | |
| Emeritus Professor Harry Messel CBE | For service to Australian science and to education as an outstanding educator raising awareness of the importance of the study of science and in particular physics, for instrumental contributions to improving science teaching in schools, and for conservation advocacy relating to endangered crocodile and alligator species. | |
| Doctor Kenneth Comninos Michael AM | For wide ranging community service to lasting benefit, particularly in the development and management of road transport systems, engineering, tertiary education, cultural institutions and the Greek community. | |
| Reverend Father Gerald Glynn O'Collins | For service to the Catholic church internationally and to scholarship as a renowned theologian, academic and influential contributor to ecumenical relations. | |
| Lady Marigold Merlyn Southey AM | For service to the community as an influential contributor to the development of philanthropy in Australia, for leadership and governance of significant artistic, educational, medical, environmental and social justice organisations and as Lieutenant Governor of Victoria. | |
| Kerry Matthew Stokes | For service to business and commerce through strategic leadership and promotion of corporate social responsibility, to the arts through executive roles and philanthropy, and to the community, particularly through contributions to organisations supporting youth. | |

=== Officer (AO) ===
==== General Division ====
| Recipient | Citation | Notes |
|---|---|---|
| The Honourable Robert Edward Borbidge | For service to economic development in Queensland through promoting business and investment opportunities, the initiation of major infrastructure projects, and attracting internationally acclaimed events; and to the community, particularly through support for biomedical research and educational organisations. | |
| Professor Gavin Brown | For service to tertiary education in Australia and internationally as an advocate for excellence and through the establishment of strategic links with overseas institutions, and to mathematical research. | |
| Professor Edward Byrne | For service to neurology as a clinician and academic and to advances in medical research, particularly in the area of mitochondrial muscle disease. | |
| Elisabeth Janet Calvert-Jones AM | For service to the community through philanthropy and support for medical research, access to education in rural areas, development of significant cultural and botanical collections, and to the print media. | |
| Anne Katherine Carnell | For service to the community of the Australian Capital Territory through contributions to economic development and support for the business sector, knowledge industries, and medical technology advances. | |
| Dr Inga Vivienne Clendinnen | For service to scholarship as a writer and historian addressing issues of fundamental concern to Australian society and for contributing to shaping public debate on conflicting contemporary issues. | |
| Dr Jeanne Margaret Collison | For service to medicine as an anaesthetist, particularly in the field of cardiac anaesthesia and as a pioneer of cardiac bypass techniques through the development of the first Australian heart-lung machine. | |
| Dr John William Copland | For service to veterinary science, particularly in the areas of veterinary parasitology and fish pathology and the application of this research to agricultural programs in developing countries. | |
| Robert John Cornall | For service to the community through contributions to the development of public policy, particularly counter terrorism arrangements in a changing global security environment; and through providing advice and governance across a diverse range of responsibilities within the civil justice system. | |
| Dr Patricia Anne Davis-Hurst AM | For service to the community through promoting awareness of reconciliation, Indigenous culture and history, and land rights; and to advising, assisting and mentoring Indigenous people. | |
| Professor Ian Robert Falconer | For service to science, particularly through research in the area of algal toxins relating to water quality management, to education internationally, and to the conservation movement. | |
| David Arnold-Keith Ferguson | For service to the law and the legal profession and to fostering links with peak legal bodies in the Asia Pacific region. | |
| Penelope Jill Figgis AM | For service to the environment and nature conservation through contributions to environmental organisations, public authorities and policy development in biodiversity conservation, protected areas and sustainable tourism. | |
| Lisa Kinkead Gasteen | For service to the performing arts and to cultural life in Australia through opera as a leading dramatic soprano of national and international stature. | |
| Professor Paul Fawcett Greenfield | For service to science and engineering, particularly through research in the areas of chemical engineering, biotechnology, wastewater and environmental management, and to the tertiary education sector. | |
| Professor David John Henderson-Smart | For service to medicine, particularly in the fields of paediatrics and neonatal and perinatal care as a clinician, researcher, administrator and educator. | |
| Stuart Keith Hicks | For service to the road transport industry through the development and implementation of reform policies and legislative frameworks, to the public sector in Western Australia, and to the community. | |
| Russell Allan Higgins | For service to the community through the development and implementation of a broad range of government policies including financial management and accountability, microeconomic reform, and science and innovation strategies. | |
| Robert Jacks | For service to Australian art as a painter, sculptor, printmaker and educator, and through support for emerging young artists. | |
| Professor Frank Cameron Jackson | For service to education, particularly in the disciplines of philosophy and social sciences as an academic, administrator and researcher. | |
| Graham Cyril Kennedy | For service to the entertainment industry as an actor, comedian and presenter significantly influencing the development of the radio, television and film industries in Australia, and to the community. | |
| Dr Donald McLean Lamberton | For service to economics as a leading academic and researcher in the field of information economics through the multidisciplinary study of the impact of technology, information and society on economic development. | |
| Malcolm Hugh Mackerras | For service to the community by raising public awareness of and encouraging debate about the political process in Australia and other western democracies, and through commitment to reform and improvement of the electoral system, and to education. | |
| Commissioner Kenneth Edward Moroney APM | For service to policing and law enforcement as Commissioner of Police in New South Wales, particularly through implementing reforms to reduce crime and increase public confidence; and for contributions to national security issues. | |
| Professor Robin Hampton Mortimer | For service to medicine, particularly in the areas of education, training and accreditation, and to endocrinology as a clinician, academic and researcher. | |
| Dr John Brian North RFD | For service to medicine as a clinician, surgeon and teacher, and as a significant contributor to research in the fields of neurological diseases and treatment of severe head injuries. | |
| John Joseph O'Connell | For service to the community through contributions to a broad range of health care, charitable, cultural and educational organisations. | |
| The Honourable Concetto Antonio Sciacca | For service to ex-service personnel, particularly through the commemorative program of events, Australia Remembers 1945-1995, to the community through support for cancer research institutions, and to the Australian Parliament. | |
| Karl Josef Seppelt | For service to the Australian wine industry through pioneering viticulture initiatives and as a contributor to a range of industry organisations. | |
| Jack Smorgon AM | For service to the community through philanthropy and support for a broad range of organisations including Jewish community and health and welfare groups; and to promoting economic development in Australia. | |
| James Alexander Strong | For service to business and commerce, particularly in the aviation, insurance and retail fields, and to the arts as an administrator and philanthropist. | |
| Marjorie Constance Turbayne OAM MBE | For service to the community through support for arts, heritage, social welfare and youth organisations, for encouraging national pride and identity, and for strengthening Anglo-Australian relations. | |
| Professor Leon van Schaik | For service to architecture as an academic, practitioner and educator, and to the community through involvement with a wide range of boards and organisations related to architecture, culture and the arts. | |
| Dr Ian Roger Vanderfield OBE | For service to the community through the delivery of health care services at Royal North Shore Hospital, Sydney, and to Rugby Union football. | |
| Barbara Frances Walker | For service to the community, particularly in the area of health care through support for the establishment of an advanced centre for the management of chronic pain; and to assisting in promoting Melbourne as the host city for a major sporting event. | |
| Professor Joy Wandin Murphy | For service to the community, particularly the Indigenous community, through significant contributions in the fields of social justice, reconciliation, land rights, equal opportunity and art. | |
| Terence Anthony White | For service to the pharmacy profession, particularly through contributions to regulatory authorities and industry reform, to the community in support of a range of social welfare, school and civic organisations, and to the Queensland Parliament. | |
| The Honourable Justice Glen Norman Williams | For service to the judiciary and to the law, particularly in the areas of law reform and legal education, and to the community through contributions to the Scouting movement and sport. | |
| Imogen de Mortimer Zethoven | For service to conservation and the environment, particularly as an advocate for the protection of the Great Barrier Reef Marine Park and as a proponent of legislation to promote biodiversity in Queensland. | |

==== Military Division ====
| Branch | Recipient | Citation | Notes |
|---|---|---|---|
| Army | Brigadier Kenneth Allan Brownrigg | For distinguished service to the Australian Defence Force, in particular as Head of Australian Defence Staff, Jakarta. | |
| Army | Major General Ian Campbell Gordon AM | For distinguished service to the Australian Defence Force in senior command and staff appointments. | |

=== Member (AM) ===
==== General Division ====
| Recipient | Citation | Notes |
|---|---|---|
| Josephine Patricia Akee | For service to the Indigenous community, particularly the people of the Torres Strait Islands through promoting understanding and recognition of traditional cultural heritage. | |
| Ruth Armytage | For service to the community through support, governance and fundraising roles for organisations including SDN Children's Services and Mission Australia. | |
| Hedley Raymond Bachmann | For service to public sector management, particularly in the areas of superannuation and remuneration policy, and to people with disabilities through the Spastic Centre of South Australia. | |
| Dr John Gratten Baker | For service to medicine as a neurosurgeon, particularly through the provision of neurosurgical services in Central Queensland. | |
| The Honourable Michael Barnett | For service to the Parliament of Western Australia and to the community of Rockingham. | |
| Dr Ross Jan Bastiaan OAM RFD | For service to the preservation of military history, particularly through designing and sculpting commemorative information plaques placed throughout the world on Australian battlefields of the two world wars, and to the dental profession. | |
| Lynette Pamella Bates | For service to the Australian Olympic Committee and to Swimming Australia through organisational and management roles for national and international competitions. | |
| Garry Frederick Baverstock | For service to architecture, the environment, and the community through education about the importance of passive solar and energy efficient design for houses and other buildings. | |
| Beris Margaret Bird | For service to international relations, particularly through the establishment of palliative care services at Nazareth Hospital, Israel, Kijabe Medical Centre, Kenya and the Baptist Mission Hospitals, Cameroon; and as a nurse educator in support of medical aid programs in developing countries. | |
| Geoffrey Ian Bird | For service to medicine in the field of reconstructive and plastic surgery, and to international relations through the provision of medical services and training for surgical staff in developing countries. | |
| Professor Robert James Bland | For service to social work education, to support for people with a mental illness and their carers, and to a range of professional and community organisations. | |
| Walter William Bolin | For service to people with vision impairment conditions through contributions to mobility training organisations and the establishment of Retina Australia. | |
| Dr Frances Marjorie Booth | For service to ophthalmology and to international relations, particularly through the development of an eye health care project to assist people in remote areas of Papua New Guinea. | |
| Carolynne A J Bourne | For service to the community through supporting and providing opportunities for talented artisans and tradespeople to develop their skills and knowledge to enhance the workplace and industry, and to fostering leading edge technologies and intercultural exchanges. | |
| Dr David Lloyd Bradford | For service to medicine in the field of sexual health as a contributor to public policy development through education programs for the medical profession and the community, and to leadership roles in professional organisations. | |
| Professor Klaus Bremhorst | For service to mechanical engineering in the areas of education and research, and to professional organisations. | |
| Clinical Associate Professor Antony Bernard Breslin | For service to thoracic medicine, particularly in the area of respiratory diseases through education, research, clinical practice and professional organisations. | |
| Professor David Rodger Brewster | For service to medicine as a paediatrician, particularly through developments in Indigenous child health care and the treatment of malnutrition in developing countries, and to medical education. | |
| Edward John Brierley | For service to education, particularly through professional organisations and contributions to promote effective leadership in secondary schools. | |
| Dr Paul Kenneth Brock | For service to public education, particularly as an adviser and author in the areas of strategic policy development, to maintaining high standards of teaching and professionalism, and to people with Motor Neurone Disease. | |
| Dr Murray Ian Brooker | For service to botany, particularly through research leading to the identification and classification in the genus Eucalyptus, and as an author. | |
| Dr Kenneth Aylesbury Brown | For service to forensic dentistry, particularly in the area of identification methods and questions of law, and to specialist education and professional organisations. | |
| Margaret Irene Brown | For service to the community through advocacy roles representing the interests of health care consumers in rural and remote areas and for contributions to policy development. | |
| Celia Anne Burrell | For service to the tourism industry in the development and promotion of outback wilderness travel and raising awareness of the cultural significance of the Kimberley region. | |
| William Westray Burrell | For service to the tourism industry in the development and promotion of outback wilderness travel and raising awareness of the cultural significance of the Kimberley region. | |
| Douglas Cameron Campbell | For service to business and to the community, particularly as a contributor to the development of communications services in regional and remote areas of Australia. | |
| Professor John Phillip Carter | For service to civil engineering through research into soil and rock mechanics and as an academic, author and adviser. | |
| Dilip Gopalkrishna Chirmuley | For service to the community, particularly through leadership roles in a range of multicultural, religious and Hindu organisations in South Australia. | |
| Leonie Therese Christopherson | For service to the development of national policies relating to issues and concerns of women, particularly through the National Council of Women of Australia, and to promoting the equal status of all in the community. | |
| Maud Clark | For service to women prisoners and ex-prisoners and marginalised youth through art, drama and music programs to develop community relationships and opportunities for education and employment. | |
| Alan Geoffrey Clifford | For service to secondary education through contributions to curriculum and policy development, particularly in relation to the Victorian Certificate of Applied Learning. | |
| Richard John Colless | For service to Australian Rules football through initiatives to develop the code nationally and in leadership roles with the Sydney Swans and West Coast Eagles football clubs. | |
| Dr Brian Correll Crisp | For service to dentistry and dental education, particularly the development of the specialty of orthodontics in Adelaide, and to the community through the Art Gallery of South Australia. | |
| The Honourable Janice Ann Crosio MBE | For service to the Australian and New South Wales parliaments, to local government, and to the community of Fairfield. | |
| Dr Michael John Dalling | For service to the biotechnology industry through contributions to research and development organisations and commercialisation efforts to benefit Australian companies, producers and consumers. | |
| Dorothy Margaret Davis | For service to tertiary education through the promotion of Australia as a study destination for international students and as a provider of education services. | |
| Professor Edward Michael Davis | For service to education and to the community in the areas of equity in employment, industrial relations and human resource management. | |
| Dr Gregory Pierre Deleuil RFD | For service to medicine, particularly in the management of care for people with asbestos related diseases, and as a medical officer to the Defence Force. | |
| Hassan Hussein Dellal | For service to the Cyprus Turkish Islamic Community of Victoria through assistance to migrants and projects to benefit the community. | |
| William Thomas Denny | For service to the community, particularly veterans and their families through the expansion of ANZAC Day commemorative events in South Australia. | |
| Graham Ronald Duff | For service to the administration of sport in Victoria through the establishment and development of the Institute of Sport and to the thoroughbred racing industry. | |
| Professor Bernard John Einoder | For service to medicine, particularly in the field of orthopaedic surgery including teaching and administrative roles and through a range of professional associations. | |
| Herman Eisenberg | For service to the community, particularly through the Great Synagogue of Sydney, the Wesley Mission and Rotary International. | |
| Belinda Ruth Epstein-Frisch | For service to people with disabilities and their families, particularly through advocacy roles to improve educational and social support within mainstream settings. | |
| Ronald Jeffrey Esdaile | For service to agriculture and to conservation through contributions to research and development leading to the adoption of more sustainable crop production practices in Australia. | |
| Ernest Harry Eves | For service to the food industry, particularly through the establishment of cereal based production companies in Australia and the development of a walnut growing and processing enterprise. | |
| Sister Mary Jennifer Fahey | For service to the Catholic education system and to the Sisters of Charity Health Service, particularly through the establishment of professional development and leadership training programs. | |
| Clinical Professor Kingsley Walton Faulkner | For service to medicine as a surgeon and in surgical skills training, and to the medical profession through the Royal Australasian College of Surgeons. | |
| Dr Alan Simon Finkel | For service to biomedical science, particularly through the design and manufacture of a range of electronic instruments, and to support for medical research and education. | |
| Kathryn Heather Finnigan APM | For service to the community, particularly through the fundraising and social welfare activities of Soroptimist International and the Order of Malta. | |
| Barry Francis Fitzpatrick | For service to the finance and banking sector and to the community through support for a range of charitable and cultural organisations. | |
| Christine Linley Forster | For service to the environment in the area of water resource management through a range of consultative and advisory roles. | |
| Dr John Edmond Frawley | For service to medicine in the fields of vascular and transplantation surgery and as a pioneer in paediatric kidney transplants. | |
| Emeritus Professor Terrence John Freer | For service to dentistry, particularly through orthodontic teaching and the establishment of standards in dental education and training. | |
| Colin Albert Fuller | For service to the development of the surveying profession and to the community, particularly through service and youth organisations. | |
| Josephine Grace Geia | For service to the Indigenous community of Palm Island through leadership, advocacy and mediation roles. | |
| Paul Gottlieb | For service to science and technology through the development and marketing of equipment and software for use in particle analysis and identification in the minerals processing sector. | |
| Keith Allingham Greenham | For service in the Swan Hill district through leadership within a range of organisations committed to community development. | |
| Professor Sasson Stephen Gubbay | For service to medicine in the field of neurology, particularly through clinical and academic contributions to the neurological care of both children and adults, and as a teacher and mentor. | |
| Professor the Honourable George Hampel QC | For service to legal education, particularly in the field of advocacy training, and to professional organisations. | |
| Dr Jeffrey Niccol Hanna | For service to medicine in the fields of public health and epidemiology, particularly through contributions in the area of communicable disease prevention and control. | |
| Karen Margaret Harmon-Stinson | For service to international relations through aid programs in developing countries, particularly by implementing a women's health project in the Philippines. | |
| Carolyn Ellen Hauff | For service to education, particularly as Principal of Clayfield College and through professional organisations. | |
| Professor Ian Bernard Hickie | For service to medicine in the development of key national mental health initiatives and general practice services in both the public and non-government sectors. | |
| Sister Anne Mary Higgins | For service to social welfare, particularly as a pastoral care worker providing support to asylum seekers and refugees, and to education. | |
| Alec Jeffrey Hill | For service to education in the field of Australian military history, to the Australian War Memorial as a writer and as a mentor to historians, and as a contributor to the Australian Dictionary of Biography. | |
| Dr Rhyl Kingston Hinwood | For service to the arts as a sculptor of artworks for public places and buildings, and through teaching roles and support for students. | |
| David Paul Hoare | For service to the light manufacturing industry in Australia, particularly through professional organisations and skills development training. | |
| Michael Finmore Hodgetts | For service to the building and construction industries in the field of quantity surveying, particularly through leadership roles and contributions to professional organisations. | |
| Christine Jessie Hunter | For service to the community, particularly for people with Myalgic Encephalomyelitis/Chronic Fatigue Syndrome and their carers, and through support for biomedical research. | |
| Dr Peter James Isdale | For service to marine science through research and as a contributor to the development and commercialisation of biotechnology. | |
| Neville Jeffress | For service to advertising and media and to the community through support for a range of charitable, church, cultural and educational organisations. | |
| Peter Thornton Kneeshaw | For service to music and to the community as an organist and choirmaster, and as an adviser in organ design and restoration. | |
| Dr Karl Sven Kruszelnicki | For service to the community through promoting greater understanding and knowledge of the application of science to daily living as an author and science commentator on radio and television. | |
| Ian Lacey | For service to the community, particularly as a contributor to law reform in relation to human rights issues and to the promotion of interfaith harmony. | |
| Dr Judith Anne Lambert | For service to the community through a range of policy development and coordination roles within the conservation and environment movement, and to local government. | |
| Dr Geoffrey Richard Lancaster | For service to the arts, particularly through interpreting and performing eighteenth century keyboard works, to orchestral direction and music education. | |
| James Victor Larkey | For service to the finance industry through support for improved regulation, and reform and governance in the management of building societies. | |
| Keith John Larner | For service to the Uniting Church in Australia through the delivery of programs providing support to prisoners to reintegrate into the community, and to the Indigenous communities of Yirrkala and Swan Valley. | |
| The Honourable Ian James Laurance | For service to the tourism industry in Western Australia, to the community as a member of the Western Australian Parliament, and to sporting, environmental and charitable organisations. | |
| Peter Hugh Lavery | For service to the dairy industry in a range of industry organisations involved in the research, promotion and development of new products, and to the expansion of markets, including export trade. | |
| William Donald Lawson | For service to engineering through the implementation of a range of major infrastructure projects in Tasmania, to Antarctic related endeavours, and to the development of youth employment programs. | |
| Francis Laurence Levy | For service to the Jewish community, particularly through a range of educational, cultural, legal and religious organisations. | |
| Pamela duRieu Linke | For service to children, particularly early childhood development as a researcher and author on parenting skills and infant mental health. | |
| Karen Margaret Lloyd | For service to people who are deaf or have hearing impairment as an advocate for improved services, funding and research and to the introduction of specialised education and personal development programs. | |
| Dr Joe Maurice Lubich | For service to local government and to the community of the City of Albany as a general practitioner, and as a contributor to the Western Australian health service. | |
| Dr Judith Mary Macdonald | For service to medicine as a paediatrician and as an advocate in the field of child health, education, welfare and disability support services. | |
| Alexander Ian Macintosh | For service to local government and regional development, particularly through the facilitation of major public infrastructure projects, to higher education, and to public relations. | |
| Ronald Jean Martin-Weber | For service to industry as a pioneer of modern distribution methods for industrial engineering products, and as a supporter of the visual arts. | |
| Ian McConachie | For service to the macadamia industry as a grower and exporter contributing to international industry relations and to the establishment of a renewable co-generation power facility. | |
| Councillor Ronald Desmond McCullough | For service to local government and to the community of Mount Isa through a range of tourism, major public infrastructure, and economic and regional development projects. | |
| Dr Elspeth Margaret McInnes | For service to social welfare in the area of developing programs to address the needs of a range of community members, including support initiatives for sole parents. | |
| Michael Joseph Monaghan | For service to the tourism and hospitality industry, particularly through development, promotion and formation of strategic partnerships for Western Australia's tourism sector, and to the community through support for a range of social welfare organisations. | |
| Peter Guy Montgomery OAM | For service to sport in a range of administrative roles related to Olympic sport and water polo. | |
| William James Moss | For service to the banking industry, particularly the development and implementation of innovative home lending and investment banking practices, and to the community through a range of sporting, tourism and disability support organisations. | |
| David William Moyle | For service to conservation and the environment, particularly as a contributor to the development of the Nature Foundation SA Incorporated and through the Nature Conservation Society of South Australia. | |
| Terence Edward O'Connor QC | For service to the community, particularly the development of higher education institutions, to health services and sporting organisations in an executive capacity, and to the legal profession. | |
| John Geoffrey Orr | For service to the accountancy profession, particularly through the promotion of professional standards, and to the community in a range of service, social welfare and church organisations. | |
| Dr Thomas Gregory Parry | For service to public administration in New South Wales, particularly through the provision of advice to government on a range of economic regulatory, business promotion and industry issues. | |
| Natalie Mary Paton OAM | For service to the community as founder of the Nursing Mothers' Association of Australia, and to the development of policies, protocols, management, support and training methods to assist nursing mothers and their babies. | |
| Garry John Payne | For service to public sector governance in New South Wales through the development and implementation of accounting, policy and legislative reforms relating to the business and administrative operations of local government councils. | |
| David John Peel | For service to the community through the Greater Brisbane Area Consultative Committee, the development of employment opportunities for Indigenous people, and small business. | |
| Richard Mark Persson | For service to the community, particularly through the development and implementation of new public policy initiatives relating to health, electronic government-wide business and provision of public housing, and to planning and local government. | |
| Doris Pilkington Garimara | For service to the arts in the area of Indigenous literature, particularly through the genre of life-storytelling to raise awareness of Indigenous history, culture and social conditions. | |
| Dr Barbara Ann Piscitelli | For service to early childhood education as a teacher, to the establishment of programs in cultural institutions for children, and as a collector and curator of children's art. | |
| Jack Plews | For service to education, particularly through Goulburn High School, and to the community as a supporter of civic and youth projects. | |
| Ronald Anthony Potter | For service to the Australian wine industry, particularly the development of new technology, support for research and education, and industry promotion. | |
| Kevin Anthony Power | For service to education in the development of vocational training and youth employment programs, to the Indigenous community through addressing low-level participation and achievement in schooling, and to sport. | |
| Dr Linda Lewis Reaby OAM | For service to community health, particularly through establishing breast cancer advocacy and support groups, raising awareness of diagnosis, treatment and prevention; and to nurse education. | |
| Hugh George Roberts | For service to the grains industry through pasture and cereal seed research and development, and to the community of Cootamundra. | |
| Dr Robyn Christine Robinson | For service to the community through the development of professional support and early intervention services in relation to psychological trauma management for emergency services organisations. | |
| Lawrence Michael Rose | For service to town planning, particularly urban development, infrastructure and residential design and to environmentally friendly soil and water management initiatives and practices. | |
| Mervyn Gordon Rose | For service to tennis, particularly as a competitor at national and international levels and as a coach and mentor to both amateur and professional players. | |
| Professor Amin Saikal | For service to the international community and to education through the development of the Centre for Arab and Islamic studies, and as an author and adviser. | |
| Nigel Frank Satterley | For service to urban development and renewal programs, to the community through support for charitable and medical research organisations, and to sport. | |
| Neville Keith Sawyer | For service to business and commerce, particularly in the manufacturing sector, to the improvement of communication links between the private and public sectors, and to developing opportunities for smaller and medium size businesses to enhance and retain skills. | |
| Carol Judith Schwartz | For service to business and commerce in a range of executive roles, and to the community through support for health promotion organisations, preservation of historic buildings and the arts. | |
| Ruth Elizabeth Shanks | For service to people in rural areas, particularly through the Country Women's Association of New South Wales, and to the community of Dubbo. | |
| John Joseph Sharkey | For service to vocational education and training, particularly through the Holmesglen Institute, and to the law. | |
| John Raymond Shepherd | For service to youth through the Operation Flinders Foundation and to the promotion and marketing of recreational programs. | |
| Norman Brian Sims | For service to medicine, particularly through the establishment of the Lions Low Vision Clinic, and to people with a visual impairment. | |
| Ross Henry Sinclair | For service to the community of Penrith, particularly through support for service, sporting, health and social welfare organisations. | |
| Barbara Mary Smith | For service to business and commerce through the accounting and financial planning professions, particularly as an author and advocate for investment in superannuation, to education, and to the community. | |
| Dr Francis George Smyth | For service to medicine through the development and provision of general oncology and reconstructive surgical services in Papua New Guinea; and to the community of Port Moresby. | |
| Dr Jennifer Mary Smyth | For service to dentistry, particularly as an educator, to the development of tertiary curriculum programs, to vocational training, and to a range of professional dental organisations. | |
| Terrence Mark Snow | For service to the building and construction industry, particularly the redevelopment of the Canberra International Airport precinct, and to the community through support for a range of charitable organisations. | |
| Eleanor Rachel Spence | For service to children's literature as an author and to the community through support for people with Autism. | |
| The Honourable Peter Cornelis Spyker | For service to the Victorian Parliament, particularly as a contributor to the development of multicultural affairs policies and as an advocate for consumer rights, health and welfare services, and migrant communities. | |
| Donald Joseph Steele | For service to the livestock and wool industries, particularly in Queensland, through administration of professional industry bodies, and to the community. | |
| Associate Professor Ross Henry Steele | For service to tertiary education, particularly the promotion of French language and culture in Australia, and to the community through support for a range of arts organisations. | |
| Marguerita Grace Stretch | For service to the community, particularly through the Australian Red Cross at national, state, regional and local levels. | |
| Peter Frederick Swan | For service to the surveying profession, particularly the formation of the Spatial Sciences Institute, to support for the unification of industry groups, to education and the establishment of tertiary curriculum programs, and to a range of professional associations. | |
| Lyn Swinburne | For service to women with breast cancer and their families through the establishment and development of Breast Cancer Network Australia. | |
| Leslie Thompson | For service to the building and construction industry, particularly through contributions to the development of national assessment and accreditation standards for professional education. | |
| Emeritus Professor John Charles Thonard | For service to dentistry and the advancement of dental education, to the promotion of dental research, and to improved multidisciplinary health science networks. | |
| Dr John Gilroy Thorne | For service to the community through a range of executive roles with Rotary International and with disability organisations, and to education. | |
| Ju Ping Tian | For service to gymnastics, particularly through the development of the Women's Gymnastics program at the Australian Institute of Sport. | |
| Peter Alfred Toogood MBE | For service to golf, to the establishment of the Australasian Golf Museum, and to the development of school sport. | |
| Dr David Whitman Vickers | For service to medicine in the area of paediatric microsurgery through the development of surgical procedures to treat congenital deformities, to the design of specialised operating instruments, and to professional organisations. | |
| Associate Professor Daryl Robert Wall | For service in the field of transplant surgery, to specialist training and support for transplant recipients to resume normal lifestyles. | |
| Peter Howard Warren | For service to the community through support for a wide range of health, social welfare, medical research and sporting bodies, and to the motor trades industry. | |
| Riley Noel Warren | For service to education, particularly the Macarthur Anglican School, to a range of professional organisations, and to the community through social welfare initiatives for youth. | |
| Margaret Eileen Watson | For service to the Uniting Church in Australia, particularly through a range of executive and representational roles both nationally and internationally, and to the ecumenical movement. | |
| Barbara Ethel Wellesley | For service to the community, particularly Good Beginnings Australia, promoting childhood and family support services, and to a range of child health organisations. | |
| Michael Vincent Wenden | For service to the Olympic movement as an administrator and competitor. | |
| Margaret Kirsten West | For service to Indigenous art, particularly as a curator and researcher, and to support for artists and the promotion of Indigenous culture. | |
| Helen Mary Westwood | For service to local government through promoting sustainable environmental management, and to the community through the Lebanese Women's Association and provision of services to people with disabilities. | |
| Doreen May Wheelwright | For service to physiotherapy, particularly as an educator, to professional development through a range of state and national representational roles, and to the community. | |
| Associate Professor Kathleen Anne Wilhelm | For service to medicine in the field of psychiatry, particularly through clinical, educational and research contributions to improving mental health. | |
| Frank Evan Williams | For service to public administration in New South Wales, particularly to the arts through the establishment of cultural institutions, the preservation and restoration of historic buildings and the development of the Sydney Festival. | |

==== Military Division ====
| Branch | Recipient | Citation | Notes |
|---|---|---|---|
| Navy | Commodore Russell Richard Baker RAN | For exceptional service to the Royal Australian Navy and the Australian Defence Force as Director General Navy Strategic Policy and Futures. | |
| Navy | Commodore Peter John Law RAN | For exceptional service to the Royal Australian Navy and the Australian Defence Force as Director General Guided Weapons and Explosive Ordnance. | |
| Army | Colonel John Byram Mansell | For exceptional performance of duty in the field of Special Operations. | |
| Army | Brigadier Stephen David Meekin | For exceptional service to the Australian Defence Force as Director Joint Intelligence Staff, Defence Intelligence Organisation; Commander Joint Captured Materiel Exploitation Center, Iraq; and Director General Scientific and Technical Analysis, Defence Intelligence Organisation. | |
| Army | Colonel Michael James Milford | For exceptional service to the Australian Defence Force as Commanding Officer of 1st Joint Support Unit and Director of Personnel — Army. | |
| Army | Brigadier Paul Bernard Retter | For exceptional service to the Australian Defence Force as Director General Preparedness and Plans - Army; Deputy Force Commander United Nations Mission in East Timor; and Director General Land Development. | |
| Air Force | Air Commodore Andrew John Kirkham RFD QC | For exceptional service in the field of military law, particularly as the Deputy Judge Advocate General (Air Force). | |
| Air Force | Group Captain William Bernard Malkin | For exceptional service to the Royal Australian Air Force in the field of F/A-18 Hornet logistics support and major capability upgrades. | |
| Air Force | Group Captain John Oddie CSC | For exceptional service as Officer Commanding, Number 86 Wing. | |
| Air Force | Group Captain David Thomas Pasfield | For exceptional service in the development of Air Force Combat Support Group. | |

=== Medal of the Order of Australia (OAM) ===
==== General Division ====
| Recipient | Citation | Notes |
|---|---|---|
| Albert Charles Adams | For service to the community of Manly, particularly through surf lifesaving. | |
| William Affleck Adams | For service to the community of Sandringham through a range of health, service and church organisations. | |
| Edgar Agius | For service to the Maltese community and to local government. | |
| Ann Patricia Aichroy | For service to the community of the Riverina area through organisations supporting cancer awareness, patient assistance and palliative care. | |
| Phillip John Ainsworth | For service to the aviation industry, particularly the manufacture and export of aircraft, aircraft engines and aviation instruments, and to the community of Bundaberg through educational organisations. | |
| Stuart William Alldritt | For service to swimming through administrative roles at club, state and national level, particularly through Swimming Australia and the New South Wales Swimming Association. | |
| George Edwin Anderson | For service to the community of Norfolk Island, particularly through preservation of the Kingston and Arthur's Vale Historic Area. | |
| Maureen May Anderson | For service to the community of Ipswich, particularly through contributions to aged care, veterans and service groups. | |
| Thelma Rose Anderson | For service to the environment and to natural heritage preservation through the establishment and maintenance of walking trails and conservation areas. | |
| Ian Bamfield Angus | For service to electronic engineering education, particularly through the Royal Melbourne Institute of Technology, and to the community. | |
| Shelley Margaret Argent | For service to the community through raising awareness of issues of acceptance, tolerance and equality for people who are gay, lesbian, bisexual and transgender, and to support for their families. | |
| Robyn Jean Arlow | For service to diving through contributions in executive and administrative roles, and as a competitor and coach. | |
| The Reverend George Gordon Ashworth | For service to the Baptist Union of Australia as a minister and to the community of Torquay. | |
| Graham Philip Austin | For service to the visual arts as a painter, particularly through the Australian Watercolour Institute. | |
| Leonard Avery | For service to the preservation and documentation of the history of Australian Army aviation. | |
| Francis Leslie Aylmer | For service to the community of Townsville, particularly through retiree, employee assistance and business development organisations. | |
| Elizabeth Anne Bachmann | For service to the community through support for the role and education of Justices of the Peace. | |
| Angela Claire Bailey | For service to the international community as the inaugural Headmistress of the School of St Jude in Arusha, Tanzania. | |
| Maureen Collette Baker | For service to the environment in the Eurobodalla region, particularly through the formation of conservation bodies and the promotion of natural resource management. | |
| Sylvia Joan Baker | For service to the community of Deniliquin, particularly through local government and social development initiatives, and to women as a role model. | |
| Councillor Martin Lambert Ballangarry | For service to the Indigenous community of the Nambucca Shire, particularly through youth, reconciliation, cultural and health initiatives. | |
| Fay Lorraine Barker | For service to the community of Townsville through local government, business, the arts and social welfare organisations. | |
| Raymond Vincent Barker | For service to the mining industry, particularly through the promotion of vocational education and training. | |
| Shirley Jean Barnett | For service to the community of Coffs Harbour, particularly through theatrical arts initiatives for young performers. | |
| Albert Abraham Barouh | For service to the community, particularly Heartbeat Victoria, and to support for health, social welfare and arts organisations. | |
| Gordon Stanley Barrett | For service to the community of Bowen through support for veterans and their families. | |
| Dr Timothy Colvile Barrett | For service to swimming, particularly through executive roles with the Queensland Swimming Association. | |
| Councillor Graham Anthony Barron | For service to the community of Toowoomba, particularly through local government, health, education and sporting organisations. | |
| Graham Lawler Bartlett | For service to tennis in the Australian Capital Territory, particularly through the Forrest Tennis Club and Tennis ACT. | |
| Duncan Macdonald Bate | For service to the community of Tocumwal and to the irrigation industry. | |
| John Gordon Bate | For service to conservation and the environment, particularly the preservation of coastal regions through a range of land care organisations. | |
| Margaret Beadman | For service to the community through support for the Australian War Memorial as a volunteer and guide, and to the Jewish community. | |
| Mary Patricia Beard | For service to the community of Geelong through support for people with a disability and their families. | |
| Reginald Hasted Beauchamp | For service to the community of Boulia through civic, emergency services, sporting and local history organisations. | |
| Daryl Wayne Bell | For service to primary industry, particularly as an advocate for rangeland management and conservation initiatives. | |
| Helene Flora Bender | For service to the community of Geelong, particularly through business and commerce, regional development, local government and tourism organisations. | |
| Arthur Stanley Bennett | For service to the community of Penrith, particularly through service groups, local government and support for people with a disability. | |
| Christine Bennett | For service to hockey as a competitor, coach and administrator, and to the community. | |
| Dr George Gordon Bennett | For service to surveying and mapping, particularly as an educator and a specialist in the field of celestial navigation and positional astronomy. | |
| Kenneth Gordon Benson | For service to gymnastics, particularly the development of young athletes, and to the YMCA. | |
| Marion Berrington | For service to the community through fundraising and support for CanTeen. | |
| Colin Frederick Black | For service to education as Headmaster of Camberwell Grammar School and to promoting professional development and policy debate within the independent school system. | |
| Geoffrey Vernell Blackburn | For service to the mining industry as a consultant geologist, particularly through significant gold and platinum discoveries and the development of new exploration techniques, and to the community as an author of works on colonial history. | |
| Ronald Carl Blair | For service to the community of Warragul, particularly through support for the welfare of veterans and their families. | |
| Ronald Darrel Blake | For service to surf lifesaving in executive and administrative roles and to the community of Burnie. | |
| Peter Hugh Blizzard | For service to the arts as a sculptor and educator. | |
| Hilda Charlotte Bloxham | For service to the community, particularly through the activities of the Parramatta and District Historical Society and the outreach services of St Paul the Apostle church. | |
| Walter Franz Bock | For service to the community through the activities of Rotary International, particularly the establishment of the Rotary Club of Burwood Community Chest Project. | |
| Rodger Gilbert Borgmeyer | For service to the community of Kangaroo Island and to the wool growing industry as a shearing trainer and coach. | |
| Neville Roland Boyce | For service to public health, particularly through the development of the Central Coast area health service, and to support for aged care, religious and service organisations. | |
| Ian Raymond Brandenburg | For service to primary industry, particularly through the Western Australian Farmers Federation and the Country Regional Councils Association, and to the community of the Lakes District. | |
| Doris Evelyn Brittliff | For service to the communities of Dora Creek and Morisset and to the Country Women's Association and the Salvation Army. | |
| Denis John Broad | For service to cricket as a player and office-bearer. | |
| Elizabeth Heather Brodribb | For service to the community through voluntary support for health and welfare organisations. | |
| Edwin Maxwell Brooker | For service to the surf lifesaving movement and to the community of Sutherland. | |
| Neil Joseph Brown † | For service to veterans and their families through the Pelican Flats Sub-Branch of the Returned and Services League of Australia. | |
| Margaret Ann Bunday | For service to education in Western Australia as a teacher and through a range of church organisations. | |
| Donald Stanley Burchill | For service to surf lifesaving at state and national level and as a mentor and examiner. | |
| Dr Ian Patrick Burges Watson | For service to medicine in the field of psychiatry through the Australasian Society for Traumatic Stress Studies and The Hobart Clinic. | |
| Lt Col Arthur Ronald Burke (Ret'd) | For service to the community, particularly to veterans and their families through the activities of the ANZAC Day Commemoration Committee of Queensland. | |
| Helene Katherine Burns | For service to the Indigenous community and to refugees. | |
| Kevin Neil Burrowes | For service to surf lifesaving as a patrol officer, instructor, competitor and through a range of administrative roles. | |
| Barbara Burrows † | For service to people with a disability, particularly through the New Deal Association. | |
| Leon William Burwell | For service to sport through a range of organisations and to support for athletes with an intellectual disability. | |
| Betty Joan Butler | For service to the community of Singleton through a range of charitable organisations. | |
| John Edward Butler | For service to education, particularly in the field of geography as a teacher, author and administrator, and to the community. | |
| John Martin Butters | For service to education promoting adult learning opportunities, and to the community through the Uniting Church in Australia. | |
| Rodney Phillip Byrne † | For service to baseball as an administrative officer, competitor and coach. | |
| Bruce Cady | For service to the community through the preservation and documentation of the history of Armidale. | |
| Desmond Gerard Cain | For service to the chicken meat industry and to the community, particularly through the establishment of Foodbank WA. | |
| Nancy Winifred Calderbank | For service to the community of Delungra, particularly the Girl Guides movement. | |
| Frederick George Calderbank | For service to the community of Delungra in a range of roles with welfare, aged care and service organisations. | |
| Francis George Calleja | For service to the Maltese community in Melbourne, particularly through the activities of the Maltese La Valette Association and the establishment of recreation groups for elderly citizens. | |
| Colin Cameron | For service to the community of Mount Gambier, including support for veterans service, social and health organisations. | |
| Allen Francis Campbell | For service to people with disabilities through the work of Glen Industries and to the community of Glen Innes. | |
| Betty Campbell | For service to the community in the area of research into animal welfare through the Canine Control Council (Queensland). | |
| John Gerald Campbell | For service to the communities of Peakhurst and Lugarno and to the St Vincent de Paul Society. | |
| Peter Andrew Campbell | For service to nursing, particularly the care of burns victims, to continuing education, and to the development of a coordinated burns service in New South Wales. | |
| Ronald Dennis Carr | For service to young people, particularly through the Rotary Club of Tamworth West and the Youth Insearch Foundation. | |
| Jean Irene Carroll | For service to the theatrical arts as a designer and teacher of millinery. | |
| Yvonne Winifred Cassidy | For service to the community of Penrith, particularly through the Australian Red Cross. | |
| Hudson Hak Fun Chen | For service to the Chinese community in Sydney. | |
| Hang Cheng | For service to the Christmas Island community. | |
| John Samuel Chenhall | For service to the community through Rotary International. | |
| Sarah Doreen Chunys | For service to the community and to youth by raising awareness of issues concerning depression and the need for initiatives to promote the positive mental health of young people. | |
| James Pender Clark | For service to the community of Scone through a range of charitable, service and aged care organisations. | |
| Lynette Clayton | For service to psychology, particularly the application of psychodrama as a clinical tool, and to the community through the Uniting Church in Australia. | |
| William Edmund Cleary | For service to business and commerce and to the community of the Australian Capital Territory. | |
| William McKenzie Clelland | For service to the community through a range of aged care, social welfare, church and education organisations and to the law. | |
| Ronald Lawson Clement | For service to the Scottish and Celtic communities in Australia, particularly through the pipe band movement. | |
| Alan Ernest Coates | For service to the community of Tamworth in a range of organisations related to education, youth initiatives and local government. | |
| Margaret Anne Coleman | For service to youth through the Girl Guides movement, to the community in the recording and documentation of the history of a range of organisations, and to the Royal Australian Historical Society. | |
| Janice Ellen Corben | For service to the community of Ferntree Gully in the provision of community based adult education opportunities. | |
| Christine Elizabeth Corby | For service to the community of the Walgett region through the provision of Indigenous medical and legal services. | |
| Anthony Vincent Costa | For service to local government and to the community of Subiaco, particularly through contributions to a range of charitable and sporting organisations. | |
| Charlie Joseph Cox | For service to local government, to the surf lifesaving movement and to the community of Casino. | |
| Kenneth John Crampton | For service to the community of St George through a range of organisations including emergency services and sporting groups. | |
| Robert Keith Cranage | For service to the sports of cross-country skiing and biathlon as a coach and administrator. | |
| George Albert Creed | For service to the community of the Calliope Shire through local government and contributions to the region's commercial, industrial and civic development. | |
| Councillor Dawn Mary Crichlow | For service to the community of the Gold Coast, particularly through local government, health, ex-service and sporting organisations. | |
| John Colin Crossley | For service to the communities of Bundaberg and Noosa, particularly through Lions Australia. | |
| Bernard Anthony Crowe | For service to the community of Parkes through a range of aged care, church, civic and sporting organisations. | |
| Michael Joseph Crowley | For service to the community of Narrabeen, particularly as a volunteer swimming instructor, and to the surf lifesaving movement. | |
| Howard William Croxon | For service to the transport industry, particularly through the Chartered Institute of Logistics and Transport and a range of honorary roles in the road transport sector in Western Australia. | |
| Herbert Raphael Crump | For service to the community of Wollongong and to sport as an athletics coach. | |
| Carol Jean Cunningham | For service to the community of Launceston, particularly through community safety, charitable and ex-service organisations. | |
| Gordon Curtis | For service to the community of Happy Valley in support of senior citizens, charitable, emergency services and local government organisations. | |
| Margaret Dorothy Daniel | For service to the community through a range of organisations related to charitable activities, politics and the arts. | |
| David Wayne Daniels | For service to the community through the drug awareness and crime abatement programs of Lions Australia. | |
| Patricia Mary Dart | For service to netball in the Australian Capital Territory serving in a range of administrative roles. | |
| Desmond Drewitt Davey | For service to education as a teacher and principal and through contributions to a number of professional organisations. | |
| Anne Davie | For service to the community of the South West Gippsland region through environmental, cultural and social welfare organisations. | |
| Christopher Jon Davies | For service to the welfare of Vietnam veterans and their families, particularly in the mid-north coast region of New South Wales. | |
| Merrell Lorraine Davis | For service to youth through the Girl Guides movement and to the community, particularly through the Australian National Capital Folk and Decorative Artists association. | |
| Ian Kenneth De La Rue † | For service to business and commerce in the upper Yarra Valley, particularly the establishment of community banks. | |
| Rita De Luca | For service to the Italian community of Adelaide, through charitable and fundraising activities. | |
| Flavia Margherita De Pasquale | For service to the Italian community of Adelaide, through charitable and fundraising activities. | |
| Jill Ivy De-Ath | For service to the community, particularly to children as a foster carer. | |
| John William Dent | For service to the community, particularly through a range of historical, service and rural youth organisations, and to surveying. | |
| Patricia Anne Dent | For service to the profession of hairdressing and to the community of Gawler. | |
| Dr Malcolm Thomas Dewar | For service to the community of Rockhampton as a medical practitioner in the field of obstetrics and gynaecology. | |
| Graeme Ronald Disney | For service to the community of Sandringham contributing to a range of local government, yachting, church and local history organisations. | |
| Marlene Anne Doran | For service to the communities of Homebush and Strathfield in support of organisations relating to community banking, civic services, crime prevention and local history. | |
| Alan Reginald Dorber | For service to the community, particularly the welfare of ex-servicemen and women and their families, through the Veterans Support and Advocacy Service Australia. | |
| Elizabeth Morag Douglas | For service to the community, particularly through the Country Women's Association of New South Wales. | |
| Kaye Lynette Duffy | For service to public health in a range of organisations including the Mercy Hospice, Newcastle, and the New South Wales Health Participation Council. | |
| Barry Ronald Duhne | For service to the surf lifesaving movement, particularly as a fundraiser and in executive roles. | |
| Christina Dullard | For service to education, particularly as Principal of Carmel School and through contributions to a range of professional organisations. | |
| Sirkka Kaarina Duncan | For service to the community through the provision of educational opportunities for older citizens. | |
| Patricia Maria Dunn | For service to the community, including support for refugees and respite care for people with disabilities and their families through church and community organisations. | |
| Ian Lindsay Dunne RFD | For service to veterans and their families, particularly in support of aged care services. | |
| Colin Henry Easey | For service to cricket as an administrator and player. | |
| Robert Colin East | For service to the community of Kiama, particularly through local government, and to the caravan and camping industry. | |
| Marjorie Edna Easton | For service to the community through the Citizens Advice Bureau of Western Australia. | |
| John Lambert Eckersley | For service to conservation and the environment in the Port Stephens area, particularly through the Soldiers Point/Salamander Bay Tidy Towns and Landcare Committee, and to the community. | |
| Angus Alexander Edmonds | For service to education, particularly the university residential college system as Principal of Emmanuel College, University of Queensland. | |
| Hugh Michael Edwards | For service to athletics as a coach, particularly for discus and hammer events. | |
| Dr Barry Noel Edwards | For service to the community, particularly through fundraising for The Leprosy Mission Australia. | |
| Leslie Dalmain Eisenhauer | For service to the Shire of Junee through local government and a range of community organisations. | |
| Nazih Halim El Asmar | For service to the Lebanese community of Victoria through cultural, charitable and welfare organisations. | |
| Douglas John Elliott | For service to the community of Dubbo in the areas of local government, health, aged care, and education. | |
| The Honourable Beryl Alice Evans | For service to the community through a range of ex-service, parliamentary and local government organisations. | |
| Sister Noela Therese Farrell | For service to the community through respite care for mothers and small children and through accommodation service organisations. | |
| The Reverend Lindsay Douglas Faulkner | For service to the community through involvement in church, aged care and social welfare organisations. | |
| Frank Fayers | For service to the community of Thornleigh, particularly by providing support for the aged, infirmed and people with disabilities. | |
| Dr Joseph Leslie Feldman | For service to medicine and to the community, particularly the development of emergency treatment programs. | |
| Herbert Frederick Fenton | For service to the community through Lions Australia and a range of ex-service welfare, aviation and church organisations. | |
| Edward Richard Fidock | For service to Rugby Union football as a competitor, coach and administrator. | |
| Leslie Allen Findlay | For service to the community through aged care, educational and service organisations. | |
| Dereck Ronald Fineberg | For service to athletics, particularly the Blacktown Little Athletics Centre. | |
| Maria Elizabeth Flavel | For service to education, developing and presenting numeracy and literacy programs to migrants, and to the Indigenous community. | |
| Jennyfer Anne Flood | For service to a range of sporting organisations for people with a vision impairment. | |
| George Flourentzou | For service to the community through support for medical research, sporting and not-for-profit organisations. | |
| Noreida Joy Fotheringham | For service to the community of Wingham, particularly through the Australian Red Cross. | |
| Desmond George Foulis | For service to the environment, particularly through contributions to native plant revegetation. | |
| Janette Ffloyd Foulkes-Taylor | For service to primary industry in a range of pastoral, educational and telecommunications organisations, and to the community of the Murchison Shire. | |
| Lindsay Cameron Frater | For service to the community of Temora, particularly through the NSW Cancer Patients' Assistance Society. | |
| James Francis Frawley BEM | For service to the community, particularly to veterans. | |
| Joan Frazer | For service to the community, particularly to ex-servicemen and women. | |
| William Calcott Freeman | For service to the visual arts as a landscape painter and to the community through support for charitable organisations. | |
| Jacob Fronistas | For service to the Greek community, particularly in the area of aged care. | |
| Erato Gabriel | For service to the Greek community, particularly in the area of aged care. | |
| Donald William Gale | For service to sailing through a range of yachting organisations. | |
| Wendy Jean Galloway | For service to the community through musical and orchestral organisations. | |
| Valma Sophie Gay | For service as a consultant and counsellor in the field of adoption services. | |
| Frederick Anthony Gaze DFC | For service to the sport of motor racing. | |
| Peter Gerard Geary | For service to youth through the Scouting movement. | |
| Hugh Gent | For service to canine activities, particularly through the Australian National Kennel Council and the Royal New South Wales Canine Council. | |
| Professor Marcia Valerie George | For service to nursing, particularly the development and implementation of new treatment and care methods for patients with cardiovascular disease. | |
| Norma Anne Geribo | For service to the community of Canada Bay and to women's soccer. | |
| Janice Mabel Gibb | For service to athletics as a team manager and official. | |
| Rodney James Gibb | For service to athletics as an official and convenor. | |
| Envoy Mick Gilbert | For service to the community through the Salvation Army's Emergency Services and Red Shield Defence Services programs. | |
| Patricia Josephine Giles | For service to local government and to the community of Pittwater. | |
| Lesley Joy Gillespie | For service to the community through support for charitable and sporting organisations, and to business and commerce. | |
| Mary Josephine Gillespie | For service to the community through the Sisters of Charity Outreach program. | |
| Roger George Gillespie | For service to the community through support for charitable and sporting organisations, and to business and commerce. | |
| Ian Doric Glachan † | For service to the Parliament of New South Wales, and to the community of the Albury region through a range of local organisations. | |
| Thomas Gleghorn | For service to the arts as a painter and teacher. | |
| Dr Roslyn Ann Glow | For service to the community, particularly Palliative Care Victoria. | |
| Mervyn Stanley Godfrey | For service to the community as a cartographer and publisher of city street reference directories. | |
| Dr Roland Ronnie Goldberg | For service to community health, particularly in support of Rotary International projects. | |
| Bill Gonis | For service to the South Australian taxi and transport industry, and to the Greek community. | |
| Luke John Gosling | For service to international humanitarian aid, particularly through fundraising activities to assist the people of East Timor. | |
| Alexander Boyd Gow † | For service to the community, particularly through Rotary International. | |
| Roma Florence Grace | For service to the community of Penrith through a range of charitable, cultural and ex-service organisations. | |
| Margaret Ann Graham | For service to nursing in the communities of Gawler and Minlaton, particularly in the area of palliative care. | |
| Glenys Barbara Grant | For service to medicine, particularly in the field of medical photographic imaging, and to the community. | |
| Eileen Gray | For service to music through the University of the Third Age Warrani Chorale and the Canberra Philharmonic Society, and to people with a disability. | |
| Edna Olwyn Green | For service to the community recording and documenting military history and to the welfare of veterans and their families. | |
| The Reverend David John Griffiths RFD | For service to the Baptist Union of Australia and to the Australian Defence Force as an Army Chaplain. | |
| Martin Greville Grogan | For service to the welfare of naval veterans and their families and to the wider community through a range of sporting organisations. | |
| Bernard Vincent Grunke | For service to the welfare of veterans and their families. | |
| David George Guinn | For service to international relations through support for the community of Mount Hagen, Papua New Guinea in a range of health, social welfare and service organisations. | |
| Dr Richard Clinton Gutch | For service to medicine as a general practitioner and through executive roles with various medical organisations. | |
| Peter Robert Hadfield | For service to athletics as a commentator and competitor and to the community through a range of charitable organisations. | |
| Mary Molly Hadfield | For service to the community in the areas of support for aged care, community health and youth. | |
| Colin Middlebrook Haines | For service to the community through service clubs, church and charitable organisations, and to local government. | |
| Bruce Thomas Haley | For service to music, particularly jazz, and to the community through charitable, service and church organisations. | |
| Helen Margaret Hall | For service to international relations, particularly in the establishment of educational facilities in Thailand. | |
| Beryle Lorraine Halliday | For service to tennis, particularly as a coach of junior players. | |
| William John Hamilton | For service to the community through organisations assisting ex-service members, youth, sport and people with a disability. | |
| Dr Simon Renell Hammond | For service to medicine as a neurologist in the central west areas of New South Wales. | |
| William Douglas Hannay | For service to local government and to the community of Blackall in a range of sporting, health and service organisations. | |
| Dr Peter Hardy-Smith | For service to medicine in the field of ophthalmology and through support for professional organisations. | |
| Beverly Anne Harrell | For service to the entertainment industry as a singer and to the community in the support of ex-service welfare organisations. | |
| Eileen Mary Harrison | For service to the Girl Guides movement in Tasmania and to the community through a range of organisations. | |
| Reginald Frank Harry | For service to the community of Port Fairy, particularly through local festivals and sporting organisations. | |
| Joan Hartley | For service to the community through the Anglican Church of Australia and to nursing in the area of aged care. | |
| Dawn Majorie Haynes | For service to education, particularly in support of improving literacy development and language learning. | |
| June Margaret Hazzlewood | For service to the community contributing to aged care organisations. | |
| Joy Heads | For service to nursing and midwifery as a specialist lactation consultant and to health professional and parent education. | |
| Jill Hellyer | For service to literature as a poet and as a supporter of Australian writers through the Australian Society of Authors. | |
| Vena Janet Henning | For service to the community through art and cultural heritage education and to the Anglican Church of Australia. | |
| Dr Mark Alexander Henschke | For service to medicine as a general practitioner and to the community of Armidale. | |
| John Herendi | For service to the Hungarian community of South Australia through cultural, social welfare and educational activities, and to the promotion of multiculturalism. | |
| Peter Kenneth Hetherington | For service to people with vision impairment and to sporting organisations. | |
| Rosemary Hickstein | For service to nursing and community health, particularly through the care of children with spina bifida hydrocephalus and in the support of their families. | |
| Dr Ralph Allan Higgins | For service to medicine in the field of ophthalmology, particularly as a contributor to the development of the Sydney Eye Hospital and through a range of medical organisations. | |
| Allan Herbert Hill | For service to local government, fire and emergency services, and maritime education. | |
| Dr Valerie Joy Hill | For service to the community of the Australian Capital Territory as a general practitioner and family counsellor. | |
| Annie Newell Hillier | For service to conservation and the environment in the Botany Bay area and to the community. | |
| Vance Anthony Hilton | For service to the community through a range of youth, athletics and charitable organisations. | |
| Walter Albert Hitchell | For service to swimming as an instructor, coach and referee, and to the community. | |
| Geoffrey James Hogan | For service to secondary education and to the community through service and church organisations. | |
| Frederick John Holdsworth | For service to the community, particularly the welfare of ex-servicemen and women and their families. | |
| John Leonard Holmes | For service to the community through music, particularly in the provision of educational opportunities and support of the Canberra Symphony Orchestra. | |
| Alexander Thomson Horne | For service to the community of Kurri Kurri through a range of service, health and youth organisations. | |
| June Rose Howarth | For service to the community through the Australian Red Cross, and for contributions to cultural, religious and welfare organisations. | |
| Renie Stewart Humphreys | For service to the community through a range of organisations including the Swansea Presbyterian Church, Meals on Wheels and Swansea Primary School. | |
| John Patrick Hurney | For service to motor sport in Western Australia as a competitor, instructor, official and license assessor. | |
| Ian John Hutton | For service to conservation and the environment on Lord Howe Island, particularly through the establishment and development of bush regeneration and weed eradication programs. | |
| Nigel Owen Hyland | For service to the community, particularly as a fundraiser for charitable organisations, and to Australian Rules football as an umpire. | |
| Robert Bruce Inkster APM | For service to the community through organisations involved in law enforcement and criminal investigation. | |
| Robert Ernest Iversen | For service to nursing, particularly in the area of providing quality mental health services, and to professional development. | |
| Gordon James | For service to the community of Manly through a range of service organisations. | |
| Valentine Max Jeffery AFSM | For service to the community of Tharwa, particularly through the local bush fire brigade. | |
| Maurice David Johnson | For service to local government and to the community of the Yorke Peninsula. | |
| Trevor Johnson | For service to the community of Wanneroo, particularly through local sporting and service organisations. | |
| Graeme Gillies Johnstone | For service to the community of Cowra through a range of service organisations. | |
| Petronella Johanna Jol | For service to women's gymnastics as a coach at local, state and national levels. | |
| Jurgis George Jonavicius | For service to the Lithuanian community, particularly through administrative roles in a range of sporting organisations. | |
| Brian Lewis Jones | For service to the Uniting Church in South Australia and to the community. | |
| Glenys Mary Jones | For service to the community through the National Council of Women of South Australia, and to the arts. | |
| John Leslie Jones | For service to the transport industry in Tasmania and to the community of the Southern Midlands. | |
| Dr Peter Gordon Kaleski | For service to dentistry. | |
| Victor Stanley Kaye | For service to the community through the provision of humanitarian aid to assist the people of East Timor. | |
| Rachel Mabel Kean | For service to the community, particularly veterans and their families through the Rats of Tobruk Association in New South Wales. | |
| Darlene Rowena Keenan | For service to youth in Epping and district as a counsellor and advocate for people in crisis. | |
| Denis Brian Keller | For service to local government and to the community of Robertstown. | |
| William Frederick Kember | For service to local government, to the community of Ganmain and to the agricultural show movement. | |
| John Robert Kerr | For service to the community through the Asthma Foundation of Western Australia. | |
| Dr Keith Burkitt Khan | For service to the community of Wollongong as a general practitioner. | |
| Geoffrey Robert King | For service to the community of Ararat through a range of local government and service organisations and to the sheep and wool industries. | |
| Dr Raymond John King | For service to the community through a range of organisations involved in maintaining mental health and suicide prevention, and to the development of programs to assist older men. | |
| Michael John King | For service to international relations as the organiser of the 'Working Tools for East Timor' project. | |
| Dr Rodney Arthur Kirkwood | For service to medicine as an ophthalmologist and to the community of Mackay. | |
| Esther Kathleen Kitching | For service to the community through the Youth Club program of the Returned and Services League of Australia. | |
| Muriel Joyce Knight | For service to the community of Mount Mee. | |
| John Frederick Kollosche | For service to the Anglican Church of Australia through the Diocese of Perth and the Archbishop's Winter Appeal for Anglicare. | |
| Elmars Kuplis | For service to the Latvian community in Tasmania and to the broader community in Hobart through a range of church and aged care organisations. | |
| Desmond Francis La Rance | For service to the community through the provision of technical aids for people with disabilities and the design and construction of housing for disadvantaged people in the Asia-Pacific region. | |
| Antony Hamilton Lamb | For service to pharmacy, to the Australian Parliament and to the community. | |
| Ralph William Lane | For service to the arts as a producer of live broadcast and recorded performances by Australian artists and to the community through the promotion of the organ and its music. | |
| Elona Catherine Lang | For service to people with developmental disabilities as a supporter and advocate for improved recreational and independent living services. | |
| Nancy Gillan Lasry | For service to the community, particularly people living with cancer and their families through a range of support programs. | |
| Attilio Lattanzio | For service to the Italian community of Melbourne. | |
| Max Lemberg | For service to the Jewish community, particularly as a teacher of religious practices and tradition. | |
| The Honourable Vincent Patrick Lester | For service to the community through the Queensland Parliament and to local government. | |
| John Alfred Lewis | For service to boxing as a trainer and coach, and to the Australian Rugby League. | |
| Dr Hilarie Elizabeth Lindsay MBE | For service to Australian literature as an author and through a range of professional organisations in support of emerging writers. | |
| Jack Karl Livingston | For service to the community of Rockhampton, particularly the welfare of the aged. | |
| Eileen Patricia Logar | For service to the community of Gawler through church, sporting and ex-service groups. | |
| Susan Carol Longmore | For service to environmental conservation, particularly in the Swan Bay and Queenscliff areas, and to the community. | |
| Elizabeth Field Lucas | For service to the community, particularly women through Zonta International, and to ex-servicewomen. | |
| The Venerable George Bromley Lucas | For service to the Anglican Church of Australia, particularly the Diocese of Melbourne. | |
| George Anthony Ludinski ED | For service to the community, particularly through the preservation and recording of the history of Fort Lytton. | |
| Dr John Michael Lumb | For service to the environment through the development and implementation of policy on public land use and initiatives related to catchment and water management in the Port Phillip and Westernport region. | |
| Lorraine Lusby | For service to the community in Roseville and Lane Cove through a range of service, educational and voluntary organisations. | |
| Gerald Andrew Lyall | For service to the welfare of veterans and their families, particularly as an adviser and advocate for totally and permanently incapacitated ex-servicemen and women. | |
| Shirley MacDonald † | For service to the community of Broomehill, particularly through the Broomehill Historical Society and the Australian Red Cross. | |
| Frederick Charles Mackillop | For service to the community of Blayney through health, aged care, service and emergency services organisations. | |
| William Scott MacPherson | For service to the community, particularly through the establishment of the Wingham Court Aged Care Complex, and to land management organisations. | |
| Kevin Francis Maher | For service to cricket, particularly in far north Queensland, and to the community of Cairns. | |
| Kenneth Charles Malpass | For service to the community through a range of ex-service welfare, sporting, bushfire and service organisations. | |
| Mirella Mancini | For service to the Italian community and to the sport of bocce. | |
| David Gregory Mann | For service to the community through a range of police, nursing, heritage and emergency services organisations. | |
| Aado Maranik | For service to target rifle shooting as a competitor, official and club office-bearer. | |
| Richard John Marks | For service to the film industry as a director and producer of documentaries, short films and commercials. | |
| Norman William Maroney APM | For service to people with a disability, particularly through the Special Olympics movement, and to the community. | |
| Arthur Dix Marshall | For service to the community through fundraising for a range of not-for-profit organisations, to sport, and to the Parliament of Western Australia. | |
| Raymond Malcome Martin | For service to surf lifesaving as a coach, instructor, assessor, first aid officer and through a range of administrative roles. | |
| Kevin James Mason | For service to secondary education, particularly the teaching of history. | |
| Dr Jean Mason- Johnson | For service to medicine, particularly in the field of dermatology, and to the community. | |
| Coral Ida Masters | For service to the communities of Wharminda and Port Neill through a range of service, agricultural, church and sporting organisations. | |
| Janine Glover Mattingley | For service to the community, particularly through the Sandybeach Community Centre and the Princess Margaret Hospital for Children Volunteers Association. | |
| Kenneth James Maughan | For service to the community of Grafton, particularly through rowing and involvement with emergency services organisations. | |
| Colin Robert McCowan | For service to tertiary education, particularly in the field of career development as a counsellor, educator and author. | |
| Sally Jane McCreedy | For service to women's softball, particularly as a player and coach. | |
| Gregory Thomas McKellar | For service to the Indigenous community, particularly through the preservation and promotion of language and culture. | |
| David Norman McKenzie | For service to the community, particularly through the drug awareness and youth programs of Lions Australia. | |
| Leslie Keith McMahon | For service to the community, particularly in the care of the aged. | |
| Janet Elliott McNaught | For service to the community through the preservation and recording of the history of the Richmond-Tweed region. | |
| Lachlan McTaggart | For service to the community of Upper Gascoyne, particularly as a pastoralist. | |
| Barbara May Medhurst | For service to the community, particularly through the research and promotion of Scottish heritage and culture in Australia. | |
| Iris Sarah Mellon | For service to the community of Cessnock through a range of church, health, social welfare and educational organisations. | |
| John Anthony Menico | For service to surf lifesaving, particularly through Queensland Surf Life Saving, and to the community. | |
| Joan Margaret Middleton | For service to lawn bowls as a player and office-holder, particularly through Bowls Australia and Bowls Tasmania. | |
| Rabbi Benzion Ephraim Milecki | For service to the Jewish community, particularly as Chief Rabbi, South Head and District Synagogue, and to the development of youth programs. | |
| Kevin Aquila Miller | For service to the performing arts, particularly opera as a performer, producer and educator. | |
| Susan Hilary Miller | For service to nursing as a practitioner and in the provision of palliative and aged care services. | |
| Dennis William Milne | For service to conservation and the environment and to the community of Minnie Water. | |
| Maureen Betty Milton | For service to the community in the field of music, particularly through the Australian Children's Choir. | |
| Robert Molines | For service to the tourism and hospitality industry in the Hunter Valley, particularly as a restaurateur. | |
| Thomas Paul Mooney | For service to sport, particularly as a contributor to the development of junior cricket and Rugby Union football in Queensland. | |
| Brian Francis Moran | For service to the community, particularly as a fundraiser for Oxfam Community Aid Abroad. | |
| Raymond Thomas Mules | For service to the community, particularly through fundraising for Novita Children's Services, and to Australian Rules football. | |
| Robert Allan Mumbler | For service to the promotion of health and welfare programs for the Indigenous community. | |
| Jill Diane Murphy | For service to children with disabilities through Riding for the Disabled. | |
| Norman Ernest Murphy | For service to the community of Griffith, particularly through local charitable organisations. | |
| Peter Douglas Murray | For service to the mining industry through improved workplace relations, safety regulations and practices. | |
| Betty Mary Murtagh | For service to the community through a range of agricultural, environmental and emergency services organisations. | |
| Peter Llewellyn Mussared | For service to the electricity industry and to the community of Belair. | |
| Barbara Ann Myles | For service to the community through the North Queensland Ostomy Association Inc. | |
| Dr Nageswaran Nagaratnam | For service to medicine, particularly in the field of geriatrics. | |
| Jean Verna Newall | For service to the preservation of local history, particularly through the Armidale and District Historical Society and the New England Girls' School. | |
| Robert Louis Newman | For service to forestry through administrative roles in industry organisations and as an educator and author, and to the community. | |
| Bich-Lien Nguyen-Navas | For service to the Vietnamese community of South Australia, particularly through the Vietnamese Women's Association. | |
| Giovanni Nicastri | For service to the community of Marulan contributing to service, sporting, local development and emergency services organisations. | |
| Dr George Nikolic | For service to medicine, particularly in the field of critical care in the Australian Capital Territory. | |
| Debbie Jane Nilsson | For service to the community, particularly through St John Ambulance Australia. | |
| Donald Graham Noblet | For service to the Uniting Church in Australia, to the Royal Guide Dogs Associations of Australia, and to the community. | |
| Dr Michael Arthur Noel | For service to medicine, particularly in the field of palliative care. | |
| Kenneth Alfred Norton | For service to the community of Mount Gambier, particularly through the development and maintenance of Umpherson Cave as a tourist attraction. | |
| Noel Robert O'Brien | For service to local government, to health, and to the community of Gunnedah. | |
| Diana Vivienne O'Neil | For service to the community in the field of social work, particularly in the areas of child and family welfare. | |
| Cynthia Mary O'Neill | For service to early childhood education, particularly through programs for preschool children with special needs and their families. | |
| Peter Valentine O'Neill | For service to art, particularly as Director of Wollongong City Gallery, and to the community. | |
| Terrence John O'Shannassy | For service to the community, particularly to youth, and to technical education for people seeking employment opportunities. | |
| John Edwards Osborne | For service to the tourism industry at regional, state and national levels, and to the sport of cycling. | |
| Gail Ann Owen | For service to the law, particularly through executive roles in a range of professional organisations. | |
| Anthony William Pahl | For service to veterans through the International War Veterans Poetry Archives. | |
| Helen Palethorpe | For service to the community of the Australian Capital Territory through the design and facilitation of fitness programs, particularly for older adults. | |
| Samuel Parasol | For service to the community, particularly through the sporting programs of Maccabi Australia. | |
| Eric John Parker | For service to the community, particularly through the Dubbo Show Society and the Royal Easter Show Western (NSW) Districts Exhibit Committee. | |
| Raymond John Parkin | For service to mining, particularly in the area of occupational safety through the Queensland Mines Rescue Service. | |
| Margaret Jacynthe Paternoster | For service to the community of Unley through support for historical and civic organisations. | |
| Margaret Irene Paterson | For service to highland dancing as a teacher and adjudicator, and through state and national highland dance organisations. | |
| Peter Romolo Patroni | For service to local government through the Shire of Yilgarn and to agricultural organisations. | |
| Donald Matthew Paul | For service to the community through a range of roles contributing to ex-service, health and educational scholarship programs in the Riverina region. | |
| Keith Payne VC | For service to the community, particularly through support for youth programs and veterans groups. | |
| Dr Valerie Alison Payne | For service to women's health as a general practitioner, particularly in the area of family planning, and to the community. | |
| Stanley John Phillips | For service to the community, particularly as a volunteer with the New South Wales Rural Fire Service. | |
| John Richard Pickford | For service to international relations through humanitarian assistance, particularly to the people of Zimbabwe. | |
| Marlene Hilda Pickford | For service to international relations through humanitarian assistance, particularly to the people of Zimbabwe. | |
| Sebastiano Pitruzzello | For service to the Australian cheese industry and to the community. | |
| The Reverend Father Wilfred Edward Plunkett | For service to the Catholic Church in Australia, particularly to the Diocese of Wagga Wagga through the provision of pastoral care. | |
| Albert James Pollard | For service to youth through the Scouting movement in Western Australia. | |
| Sister Eileen Patricia Pollard | For service to nursing, particularly through reforms to nursing education, and to the community as a fundraiser for cancer research. | |
| Reginald Allen Poole | For service to the music and entertainment industry as a country music singer and songwriter, and to the community. | |
| Malcolm Frederick Potter | For service to the community through music education and music appreciation organisations. | |
| Ernest Levi Poxon | For service to the community of Boort, particularly as a supporter of health and aged care organisations. | |
| Surendra Prasad | For service to the community, particularly as a contributor to multiculturalism and to multi-faith dialogue in Queensland. | |
| Professor Uwe Proske | For service to physiology, particularly in the area of neuroscience, and to medical research. | |
| Christian Peter Radtke | For service to military aviation history, particularly through the Aviation Historical Society of the Northern Territory. | |
| Dr Leslie Clyde Rae | For service to medicine, particularly through the National Bowelscan Committee, and to aged persons. | |
| The Reverend Father Richard John Rafter | For service to the Catholic Church and to the community of Geelong. | |
| Ann Ramsay | For service to the community as a volunteer radio broadcaster of church music. | |
| Leona Vivienne Ramsay | For service to the community of Parkes, particularly as a midwife and antenatal educator. | |
| Laurence William Rawle | For service to the community of Shoalhaven Heads, particularly through the Shoalhaven Heads Sub-Branch of the Returned and Services League of Australia and the Rural Fire Brigade. | |
| Edna Jane Reedy | For service to the pony club movement in New South Wales, particularly as an instructor, judge and official. | |
| Mary Yvonne Reeves † | For service to the community of the Shoalhaven region and the Rural Fire Service through the establishment and coordination of the Shoalhaven Central Catering Brigade. | |
| Alan John Reid | For service to environmental education. | |
| Graham Noel Reynolds | For service to the community, particularly through the provision of insurance and financial management advice to a range of social welfare, religious, educational and medical organisations. | |
| Joan Richards | For service to the community, particularly as a contributor to the development and support of Indigenous project initiatives through the Sydney Rotary Club. | |
| Daryl Curtis Riddle | For service to education as Principal of Christian College, Geelong. | |
| Donald Taylor Ritchie | For service to the community through programs to prevent suicide. | |
| David Brendon Roberts | For service to the livestock industry in Western Australia, to the Anglican Church, and to the community of Dandaragan through sporting, conservation and health organisations. | |
| Albert Horace Rodd | For service to the community of Bairnsdale through education, health and ex-service organisations and the establishment of the Beaufort Memorial Gardens. | |
| Meinard Karel Rook | For service to the community, particularly through organisations assisting people with disabilities and special needs. | |
| Joseph Gerard Ross | For service to local government and to the community of the Redland Shire. | |
| Margot Miller Rottem | For service to the community, particularly through a range of art, charitable and youth organisations. | |
| Harold Mitford Rowell | For service to the community through ex-service, social welfare and medical research organisations. | |
| Margaret de Bohun Royds | For service to the community of Braidwood, particularly through the preservation of historic properties and the promotion of tourism. | |
| Kevin James Rule | For service to botany, particularly in the field of eucalyptus taxonomy. | |
| Lloyd William Saltmarsh † | For service to veterans and their families and to the community, particularly through the University of the Third Age and the Neighbourhood Watch Program. | |
| Vera Winifred Saltmarsh † | For service to veterans and their families and to the community, particularly through the University of the Third Age and the Neighbourhood Watch Program. | |
| Jeffrey Leonard Sayle | For service to Rugby Union football through the Randwick Rugby Union Club, and to surf lifesaving through the Coogee Surf Life Saving Club. | |
| Dr William Thomas Scales | For service to ophthalmology and to the community of South Australia, particularly people living in remote Indigenous communities. | |
| Barry Lawrence Scott | For service to the community of Carnarvon through service, conservation and sporting organisations. | |
| Philip Earle Scott | For service to architecture and to the community through welfare and heritage organisations. | |
| John Ronald Sealey | For service to the fishing industry, particularly in the areas of training and occupational health and safety, and to the community. | |
| Philip Alan Selth | For service to the law, particularly through the New South Wales Bar Association, to public administration, and to the community. | |
| Ronald Douglas Sharpe | For service to the community of the Gosford region through a range of service and social welfare organisations. | |
| Robin Noela Shepherd | For service to people in Queensland with intellectual disabilities. | |
| Graham Vincent Sherry | For service to Australian Rules football, to business and commerce through industry organisations, and to the community. | |
| Dorothy Adela Shields | For service to the community of Victor Harbor through a range of heritage, disability support, tourism and local government organisations. | |
| Joy Patricia Sinclair | For service to the community through social welfare and service organisations, particularly the Australian Institute of Welfare and Community Workers. | |
| Ian Charles Slater | For service to the community through Rotary International, particularly in relation to the promotion of operatic performance experiences for young Australians. | |
| Captain Peter John Small | For service to transport as a marine pilot, particularly in the waters of the Great Barrier Reef and Torres Strait. | |
| Gerald Fernley Smith † | For service to the community through community based mental health organisations, particularly the Schizophrenia Fellowship of New South Wales. | |
| Keith Smith | For service to the community of South Australia, particularly through leadership in the provision of social welfare services. | |
| Noel William Smith | For service to the arts through music, particularly as an orchestral conductor. | |
| Joyce Annie Smith | For service to the arts as a costumer for performing arts organisations and to the community of Townsville. | |
| Dr Henry Brian Smith | For service to the communities of Latrobe and Devonport through a range of organisations, and to medicine. | |
| Julie Maria Somers | For service to the arts through ballet, particularly as a dancer. | |
| Carlyle David Spinks | For service to youth through the Scouting movement, and to the community. | |
| Associate Professor Geoffrey Colman Stacy | For service to dentistry, particularly in the area of oral and maxillofacial surgery, and to the community. | |
| Major Charles Walter Stevens RFD ED | For service to the community through a range of organisations including the Friends of the Second Infantry Battalions, the Fort Scratchley Historical Society and the Macquarie Soccer Referees Association. | |
| Graham Wesley Stocks | For service to the community as an organist and to music education, particularly through the establishment of the Murray Conservatorium. | |
| Brian Allan Stratton | For service to art as a painter and educator, and to professional organisations including the Australian Watercolour Institute. | |
| Joan Elizabeth Sturzaker | For service to the community through the promotion and protection of animal welfare. | |
| Jack Wong Sue | For service to the community, particularly through the preservation and recording of military and maritime history. | |
| Clarice Suthers | For service to the community, particularly through the Forum Communicators Association and as a bridge teacher. | |
| Ethel Merle Synold † | For service to the community of Kangaroo Valley, particularly through support for improved health care facilities. | |
| Margaret Kinmond Taylor | For service to people with an intellectual disability, particularly through the Activ Foundation, and to the community. | |
| Anthony John Thirlwell | For service to tourism, particularly through executive roles with Tourism New South Wales, the Australian Tourist Commission and related tourism industry organisations. | |
| Ian Clive Thomas | For service to the community, particularly to youth through a range of organisations including the Australian Primary Schools Sports Association, the New South Wales Primary Schools Sports Association and the Scouting movement. | |
| Rory James Thomas | For service to the community, particularly to youth, as a music teacher and as director of a number of jazz bands. | |
| Catherine Bernadette Thompson | For service to the community of Coolamon through a range of aged care, social welfare and health related organisations. | |
| John Duncan Thompson | For service to golf, particularly through the Downs and District Veteran Golf Association. | |
| Dora Biggerton Thomson | For service to the community through a range of palliative care and church organisations, and to local government. | |
| Ashleigh Hambridge Tobin | For service to the community of Adelaide through music education and organ recitals. | |
| Shirley Maxine Tonkin | For service to the community through the promotion and support of facilities for isolated families, particularly the Kalgoorlie School of the Air, and as an oral historian. | |
| John Arthur Toogood | For service to golf, particularly junior golf through administrative roles and as a player and teacher. | |
| Brian Sydney Treloar | For service to local government and to the community, particularly through health-care, church and freemasonry organisations. | |
| Ross Tully | For service to the wool industry as a sheep breeder and wool classer, particularly through the New England Wool Expo and the Australian Superfine Wool Growers' Association, and to the community of Armidale. | |
| Beverley Clare Twibell | For service to the community through fundraising for charitable and medical research organisations. | |
| Dr Walter Beresford Utber | For service to medicine as a general practitioner and to the community of Strathfield. | |
| Anthony Nicholas van Grieken | For service to the community through the Netherlands Ex-Servicemen and Women's Association in Australia. | |
| Councillor Minas Joseph Venardos | For service to local government and to the community of the Cooloola Shire. | |
| Vincent Thomas Vernick | For service to the community of Beenleigh through the establishment of a range of family support programs. | |
| Keith Robert Victorsen | For service to the community, particularly through the Royal United Service Institute of Queensland. | |
| Kevin Vogelsang | For service to amateur boxing, particularly through coaching and administrative roles. | |
| Judith Lesley Walker | For service to the community, particularly through social welfare roles within the Anglican Parish of Inala. | |
| Dr Brian Willoughby Walklate | For service to the community of Charlton as a general practitioner, and through a range of community organisations, particularly the Rotary Club of Charlton. | |
| Philip Buxton Walsh | For service to the community of Maroubra as a supporter of a range of educational, arts, medical, sports and seniors organisations and events, and to pharmacy. | |
| Richard Buxton Walsh | For service to the community of Maroubra as a supporter of business, educational, arts, medical, sports and seniors organisations and events, and to pharmacy. | |
| Rille Walshe | For service to the community, particularly through social welfare roles and organisations supporting single parents and their children. | |
| Keith Ward | For service to the community of the Sorell area, particularly through the Dunalley Neighbourhood Centre and the Primrose Sands Sub-Branch of the Returned and Services League of Australia. | |
| Dr Susan Jane Wareham | For service to the community and to the peace movement, particularly through the Medical Association for Prevention of War. | |
| Janet Anne Wealand | For service to the community of Wagga Wagga through a range of medical, social welfare and sports organisations. | |
| Douglas Mackay Webb | For service to the community, particularly through contributions to primary industry, heritage and regional service organisations. | |
| Maurice Degrelle Webb | For service to the community of Yeppoon through sports and service organisations and in local government roles. | |
| Ronald Vincent Webb | For service to cycling, particularly as a promoter and race director for cycling events. | |
| Mary Ruth Webster | For service to sport, particularly as a contributor to sports development and its promotion in girls' schools, and to the community. | |
| Wendy Fay Weight | For service to the arts, particularly through the development of the Wesley Performing Arts Centre and as a contributor in the field of music education in the Wimmera region. | |
| Edward Richard White | For service to the community, particularly in the Lane Cove area through a range of charitable organisations. | |
| Michael Francis Williamson | For service to the community as a fundraiser for leukaemia research at the Royal Children's Hospital, Melbourne. | |
| Ray Harper Wilson | For service to the visual arts, particularly through fundraising roles and the donation of art works to public institutions in Australia. | |
| Peter Graeme Winstanley RFD | For service to the community, particularly through the Burma Thailand Railway Memorial Association. | |
| Frances Ruth Wootton | For service to the Uniting Church in Australia and to the community through social welfare initiatives in the Bondi area. | |
| Ian James Wright | For service to the surf lifesaving movement, particularly through education and development roles within Surf Life Saving Australia. | |
| John Denis Wrigley | For service to the Camden community, particularly as a contributor to the preservation of local history. | |
| Elinor Dawn Wrobel | For service to the arts, particularly as a benefactor and supporter of art institutions, and to the community through the development of the Lucy Osburn-Nightingale Foundation Museum. | |
| Virginia Ann Wykes | For service to the community in western New South Wales through the support of health and service organisations, local tourism and pilot club activities. | |
| Robyn Margaret Yates | For service to special education, particularly through the development of professional learning opportunities for teachers of students with disabilities. | |
| Commander Stephen John Youll RAN (Ret'd) | For service to the veteran community, particularly through the HMAS Perth National Association. | |
| Dr Peter Zelas | For service to medicine and to the community of western Sydney, particularly through roles at the Blacktown Hospital and in the field of colorectal surgery. | |
| Eugene Zubryn | For service to the Russian community of Melbourne in support of cultural, welfare, church and children's organisations. | |
| Eric John Zupp | For service to the motor trades industry, and to the community through support for a range of social welfare organisations. | |

==== Military Division ====
| Branch | Recipient | Citation | Notes |
|---|---|---|---|
| Navy | Lieutenant Commander Mark Leonard Burton RAN | For meritorious leadership in the Royal Australian Navy, especially when posted as Head - Management and Strategic Studies Faculty, Royal Australian Naval College, and as the Maritime Engineer Adviser to the Papua New Guinea Defence Force. | |
| Navy | Chief Petty Officer Peter James Jones | For meritorious service in the performance of duty as the Combat Systems Manager in HMAS STUART and in previous postings as the Combat Systems Supervisor in HMAS BRISBANE, Combat Systems Instructor at HMAS WATERHEN, and Senior Instructor and Chief Petty Officer at the Recruit School, HMAS CERBERUS. | |
| Navy | Commander Ross Alexander Wendt RANR | For meritorious service to the Royal Australian Navy. | |
| Army | Warrant Officer Class Two Peter Nicholas Gutzeit | For meritorious service in the performance of duty as the Training Sergeant, 5th Aviation Regiment and Squadron Sergeant Major, B Squadron, 5th Aviation Regiment. | |
| Army | Warrant Officer Class One Stephen Michal Hladio | For meritorious service as Regimental Sergeant Major of the Defence Force School of Music and Australian Army Band Corps. | |
| Army | Warrant Officer Class One Graeme Thomas Smith | For meritorious service and performance of duty while employed as the Regimental Sergeant Major of the 2nd Battalion, Royal Australian Regiment, 11th Brigade and the Army Recruit Training Centre. | |
| Army | Warrant Officer Class One Stephen John Swaysland | For meritorious service as the Regimental Quartermaster Sergeant of the 9th Battalion, the Royal Queensland Regiment and the 6th Battalion, Royal Australian Regiment. | |
| Air Force | Sergeant Michael Craig Melia | For meritorious performance of duties as an Instructor and Course Developer at Number 278 Squadron. | |
| Air Force | Wing Commander Gavin John Pearce | For meritorious service to the Royal Australian Air Force as the Resident Project Engineering Manager for Project AIR 5077 Airborne Early Warning and Control (Project Wedgetail). | |
