= Fred M. Packard Award =

International nature conservation award

- Description: Recognition of outstanding service to protected and conserved areas
- Country: International
- Presented by: International Union for Conservation of Nature (IUCN)
- Website: www.iucn.org/our-union/commissions/world-commission-protected-areas

The IUCN WCPA Fred M. Packard Award is an international merit award which is made by the International Union for Conservation of Nature to individuals or groups in recognition of "outstanding service to protected and conserved areas" across the globe. The award is named for the individual who served as the Secretary to the World Commission on Protected Areas in the early 1970s. Packard initially established the award in recognition of the "valour" of field wardens fighting and at times losing their lives to poachers in the course of conservation work, mostly in the developing world. At the third World National Parks Congress in Bali, 1982 the award was expanded to include people and organisations who have "contributed to protected areas far above and beyond the call of duty".

== Packard Awardees 1982 ==
- Syed Ahmed (India)
- Kepala Seksis (Indonesia)
- Charles Gibson Connell (UK)
- Insa Diatta and Yanya Danfa (Senegal)
- Myles Dunphy (Australia)
- Jose Rafael Garcia (Venezuela)
- Sylvanus Gorio (Papua New Guinea)
- Jean-Paul Harroy (Belgium)
- Miravaldo de Jesus Siguara (Brazil)
- Joseph Kioko (Kenya)
- Peter Logwe (and the Kidepo Valley National Park Ranger Force)
- Fergus Lothian (Canada)
- George Ruhle (United States)
- Fateh Singh Rathore (India)
- Soedjarwo and his Staff (Indonesia)
- Robert I. Standish (United States)
- Peter Stanton (Australia)

== Packard Awardees 1984 ==
- Bob Brown (Australia)
- Gabriel Charles (Saint Lucia)
- Passe Manner (Senegal)
- Robert Milne (United States)

== Packard Awardees 1985 ==
- Sudabar Ali (India)
- Shri Qutub (India)

== Packard Awardees 1987 ==
- Mamadou Sadio (Senegal)
- Ahmed Tcholli (Niger)
- Robert Tei (Ivory Coast)

== Packard Awardees 1988 ==
- Ray Dasmann (United States)
- Ricardo Luti (Argentina)
- Kenton Miller (United States)
- Josip Movcan (Yugoslavia)
- Francisco Ponce (El Salvador)

== Packard Awardees 1990 ==
- Biocenosis AC and Lic. Manzanilla Shafer
- Gerardo Budowski
- Samuel A. Cooke
- Harold Eidsvik
- John Foster

== Packard Awardees 1992 ==
- Abdulaziz H. Abuzinada
- Carlos Castaño Uribe
- Mario Gabaldón and the staff of INPARQUES
- Madeleine de Grandmaison
- Almirante Ibsen de Gusmao Camara
- Jorge Ignacio Hernandez Camacho
- Tom Van't Hof
- Aila Keto
- Vladimar Krinitsky
- Hugh Lamprey
- Joseph Mburugu
- Carlos Mendez Montenegro and Alex Rodolfo Mendez Del Cid
- P. Srinivas
- Vladislav Vassiliev

== Packard Awardees 1993 ==
- Lars-Erik Esping and his Staff
- Arne Kaasik
- Tasuku Ono

== Packard Awardees 1994 ==
- Ian Craven
- P.H. C. Bing Lucas
- Troels M. Pedersen
- Robbie Robinson
- Luis Honorio Rolon
- Robert Ferdinand Schloeth
- I. Made Sutaadi
- Edgar Wayburn

== Packard Awardees 1995 ==
- Abdullah Bin Abdulaziz Bin Moammar

== Packard Awardees 1996 ==
- Peter Hitchcock
- Abeedulah Jan
- Kotaro Kusakabe
- Perez Olindo
- H.S. Panwar
- Effendy A. Sumardja

== Packard Awardees 1997 ==
- D.D. Boro
- A.K. Brahma
- Jorge Cabrera Hidalgo
- Ricardo Pascual Garcia
- Silvino Gonzalez
- Hannu Ormio
- Kyran D. Thelen

== Packard Awardees 1998 ==
- Bob Carr
- Graeme Kelleher

== Packard Awardees 1999 ==
- Woo Bo-Myeong
- Datuk Lamri Ali

== Packard Awardees 2000 ==
- Nancy Foster
- Adrian Phillips
- Marija Zupancic-Vicar

== Packard Awardees 2001 ==
- Clive Marsh
- Robert G. Stanton

== Packard Awardees 2003 ==
- Jean Chretien
- Lawrence S. Hamilton
- J. Michael McCloskey
- Carmen Miranda
- Mavuso Msimang
- Marshall Murphree

== Packard Awardees 2004 ==
- Bruce Amos (Conservationist)
- Imogen Zethoven and Virginia Chadwick
- Jaime Incer
- Allen Putney
- Vsevolod Stepanitskiy
- Jim Thorsell

== Packard Awardees 2007 ==
- Carlos Ponce del Prado

== Packard Awardees 2008 ==
- Muslih Al-Juaid
- Henri Blaffart
- Robert Cartagena
- Ernesto Enkerlin
- Maria Tereza
- Moses Mapesa
- George N. Wallace

== Packard Awardees 2012 ==
- Ibrahim Bello
- Yury Darman
- Julia Miranda Londoño
- Antonio Negrete

== Packard Awardees 2014 ==
- Grazia Borrini-Feyerabend
- Peter Cochrane (Scientist)
- Alan Latourelle
- Harvey Locke
- Cláudio C. Maretti
- The Rangers of Virunga National Park
- Widodo Sukohadi Ramono

== Packard Awardees 2016 ==
- Georgina Bustamente and Alessandra Vanzell-Khouri
- Roger Crofts
- Jon Jarvis
- Nik Lopoukhine
- Sonam Wangchuk (engineer)
- Graeme Worboys

== Packard Awardees 2019 ==
- Julio Alberto Carrera Lopez
- Sonia Bone Guajajara & APIB
- Floyd Homer
- Carlos Alberto Pinto Dos Santos

== Packard Awardees 2021 ==
- James Barnes
- Silvana Campello
- Penelope Figgis
- Sarat Babu Gidda
- Dan Laffoley
- David (Dave) MacKinnon
- Denise M. Rambaldi
- Pedro Rosabal
- Romeo B. Trono
