= Mission Blue (film) =

- Film poster
- Directed by: Robert Nixon; Fisher Stevens
- Starring: Barbara Block; James Cameron; Mike deGruy
- Production companies: Insurgent Media; Diamond Docs; True Blue Films
- Distributed by: Netflix
- Release dates: January 30, 2014 (Santa Barbara International Film Festival); August 15, 2014
- Running time: 95 minutes
- Countries: USA, Bermuda, Ecuador
- Language: English

Mission Blue is a 2014 documentary film following Dr. Sylvia Earle on her quest trying to protect the ocean from threats as pollution, overfishing and climate change. It won the 2015 News & Documentary Emmy Award for Outstanding Editing – Documentary and Long Form.

== Cast ==
- Barbara Block
- James Cameron
- Mike deGruy
- Sylvia Earle
- Bryce Groark
- Graham Hankes
- Jeremy Jackson
- Carl Safina
- Fisher Stevens
- Liz Taylor
- Imogen Zethoven
