= Kneeshaw =

Kneeshaw is a surname. Notable people with the surname include:

- Frederick Kneeshaw (1883–1955), New Zealand-born Australian politician
- Herbert Kneeshaw (1883–1955), English footballer
- John Kneeshaw (1878–1960), British political activist
- Peter Kneeshaw, Australian organist
- Wilson Kneeshaw (born 1994), English footballer
