= Imogen Zethoven =

Australian environmental conservationist

Imogen Zethhoven AO
- Other name: Imogen Hilary de Mortimer Zethoven
- Education: University of Adelaide
- Awards: Fred M. Packard Award

Imogen Zethoven AO is an Australian environmental conservationist. She was instrumental in the establishment of the Great Barrier Reef Marine Park and has won international recognition for her conservation work.

== Education ==
Zethoven was educated at the University of Adelaide where she completed a masters of environmental studies titled "Sustainable development: a critique of perspectives".

== Career ==
While working for WWF Australia, Zethoven was awarded the international Fred M. Packard Award in 2004, jointly with Virginia Chadwick, chair and CEO of the Great Barrier Reef Marine Park Authority, for their work "furthering the conservation objectives of protected areas" to the Australian community.

Zethoven appeared in the 2014 documentary Mission Blue featuring oceanographer Sylvia Earle.

In 2021, she prepared a report for the Australian Marine Conservation Society (AMCS) titled "The last decade: the World Heritage Committee and the Great Barrier Reef: A review and recommendations for change." As well as advising the AMCS, she is a member of the Reef 2050 Advisory Committee and has argued in favour of UNESCO placing the Great Barrier Reef on the List of World Heritage sites in danger.

== Awards and recognition ==
She was appointed an Officer of the Order of Australia in the 2006 Australia Day Honours in recognition of her work for conservation and the environment, including advocating for the establishment of the Great Barrier Reef Marine Park and the legislation underpinning it.
