= Aila Keto =

Aila Keto AO
- Born: Aila Inkeri Keto; 14 March 1943; Tully, Queensland
- Education: University of Queensland
- Known for: Tropical rainforests of North Queensland : their conservation significance / a report to the Australian Heritage Commission by the Rainforest Conservation Society of Queensland (1986); The central eastern rainforests of Australia : World Heritage nomination (1992); Australian Rainforest Conservation Society (1982-Present)
- Spouse: Keith Scott
- Awards: IUCN Fred M. Packard Award(1992) in recognition of outstanding service to protected and conserved areas; Order of Australia (1994) for service to conservation, particularly through promoting the protection and management of the wet tropical rainforests of Queensland; Centenary Medal (2001) "for service as an expert on wet tropics and as a leading conservationist and academic".; Volvo Environment Prize(2005); Queensland Greats Awards (2005)
- Scientific career
- Fields: Microbiology, Ecology, Conservation
- Workplaces: University of Queensland; Griffith University
- Thesis: Studies on pig and rabbit creatine kinases (PhD Thesis) (1980)

Aila Inkeri Keto AO (born 14 March 1943) is an Australian environmentalist. She is the founder and President of the Rainforest Conservation Society in Queensland, Australia, now known as the Australian Rainforest Conservation Society. In 2005, Keto was a recipient of the Queensland Greats Awards.

Born in Tully, Queensland, Australia, to parents of Finnish origin, Dr Keto originally studied biochemistry and worked at the University of Queensland.

In 1992, Keto received the IUCN Fred M. Packard Award in recognition of "outstanding service to protected and conserved areas" and in 1994 she was awarded an Officer of the Order of Australia for “service to conservation, particularly through promoting the protection and management of the wet tropical rainforests of Queensland”. She was nominated as Queenslander of the Year in 2000 and in 2001 she was awarded a Centenary Medal, "for service as an expert on wet tropics and as a leading conservationist and academic".

In 2005, Dr Keto was awarded the Volvo Environment Prize for her work which, led to the protection of more than 15,000 square kilometres (5,800 sq mi) of Queensland's rainforest. This is only one of a series of awards that have been given to her for her environmental and conservation work which has resulted in three successful nominations for world heritage status: Wet Tropics, Fraser Island and the Central Eastern Rainforest Reserves of Australia (now Gondwana Rainforests of Australia).
