= Robert Nixon (filmmaker) =

American film director, writer, and conservationist

- Born: Robert Henry Nixon; 1954 (age 71–72)
- Occupations: Film director, writer, conservationist
- Years active: 1978–present
- Board member of: Earth Conservation Corps; The Pearl Foundation; Wings Over America
- Spouse: Sarah Thorsby Guinan
- Children: 3
- Parent(s): Robert Nixon; Agnes Nixon
- Awards: Academy Award nominee National Geographic Hero of the Planet; President's Service Award (Clinton Administration)

Robert Henry Nixon (born 1954) is an American film director, writer, and conservationist. His films, often focused on the battles of tribal peoples and field biologists, include Amazon Diary, America The Beautiful, The End of the Game, Fossey's War, Gorillas in the Mist, Endangered Species, The Last Rivermen, American Heroes, Mission Blue, Great White Highway, The Lord God Bird, Peter Beard's Africa: Last Word From Paradise, The Flight Of Double Eagle II, So Long Lady and The Falconer.

== Early life and education ==
Nixon was born in 1954. His father, Robert, was an executive with Chrysler; his mother, Agnes Nixon, the creator of One Life to Live and All My Children, is regarded as a pioneer in bringing social consciousness to daytime television.

Raised in a Philadelphia suburb, Nixon aspired to be a field biologist but academic challenges at Episcopal Academy led him to England, where he was an apprentice falconer to Master Falconer Phillip Glasier. He subsequently searched the rainforest of Guyana to study and photograph the little-known ornate hawk eagle and the harpy eagle.

Returning to America, Nixon established a Raptor education program at The Wildlife Preserve under the guidance of master falconer Jim Fowler, the co-host of Mutual of Omaha's Wild Kingdom.

== Career ==
=== Film ===
Often hired to "fly" raptors for feature films and television commercials, Nixon began his career in film as a professional falconer in the mid-70s. In 1976, he began producing adventure and environmental documentaries for ABC's American Sportsman series. In 1979, Nixon led a film crew to Rwanda to produce a documentary about famed zoologist Dian Fossey. Nixon pressed Fossey to allow him to make a dramatic film about her life; she agreed to grant him the rights to her story, for free, provided that he spend a year dedicated to hands-on conservation. Film studios became interested in Fossey's life after she was murdered in 1985, and her story was told in the feature film, Gorillas in the Mist, which Nixon co-produced. The film, which starred Sigourney Weaver, was a critical and commercial success. Nixon next wrote, produced and directed the dramatic film Amazon Diary, which was nominated for an Academy Award for Best Live Action Short Film in 1990. Shot in the Amazon, the film examined the story of the Kayapo Indians, their relationship with the harpy eagle and their battle to protect the rain forest.

Nixon's subsequent films continued to focus on themes related to conservation, ecology, and environmental activism, and included the 1990 documentary, America the Beautiful, which was hosted by Curt Gowdy and featured President George H. W. Bush. In 2014, Nixon produced and directed Mission Blue, a biographical portrait of renowned oceanographer and eco-activist Sylvia Earle. The film's premiere served as the opening of the 2014 Santa Barbara International Film Festival.

Nixon's film Amazon Diary was preserved by the Academy Film Archive in 2012.

=== Conservation ===
In the early 1990s, after he read a New York Times article about the garbage-choked Anacostia River, which runs through one of America's poorest neighborhoods in Washington, D.C., Nixon decided that engaging local unemployed youth to restore their river would be his environmental year in honor of Fossey. Nixon moved from Malibu, California to Washington, D.C., and secured a $50,000 grant from the Coors Foundation to launch the Earth Conservation Corps, a stalled domestic policy initiative which Nixon had discussed with President George G.W. Bush during the production of America the Beautiful. He persuaded seven teenage boys and two teenage girls to volunteer to clean up the river, and together they hauled thousands of tires from the water; the program later expanded to include replanting wetlands, restoring river habitats, and creating parks and trails.

Since its launch, corps member have provided more than one million hours of service, mobilizing thousands of young people and fostering the involvement of the city and Federal government. Earth Conservation Corps has additionally established several environmental groups on the Anacostia River, including the Anacostia RiverKeeper, the Living Classroom Foundation, and the Pearl Coalition, an educational project centered on the Pearl, a schooner chartered for the largest recorded slave escape attempt in American history. Considered a model for minority engagement in environmental service, Earth Conservation Corps members volunteer 1700 hours restoring the Anacostia River and in return receive a nominal bi-weekly stipend and a college scholarship through the federal AmeriCorps program. Nixon, who originally intended to spend only a year on the project, has remained the group's leader for more than 20 years. "I came here because I thought, you know, point out the problem, and the cavalry would arrive and I'd go back to making feature films," he told CBS News correspondent Ed Bradley. "I'm still waiting for the cavalry, you know?"

Inspired by the impact of the Earth Conservation Corps, Nixon founded Wings Over America, a non-profit which pairs adjudicated youth with injured birds of prey as part of the rehabilitation process. His work as a conservationist and activist has generated significant media attention, and has been covered by 60 Minutes, Now with Bill Moyers, PBS and NPR, among many other broadcast outlets. Nixon has been featured in publications including Time, The Washington Post, The Los Angeles Times and The New York Times..

== Personal life ==
Nixon and his wife, Sarah Thorsby Guinan, live in Washington, D.C., and Martha's Vineyard, where they own The Menemsha Inn and Cottages, the Beach Plum Inn and Restaurant, and the Home Port Restaurant.

After seeing a story about injured veterans in Afghanistan, their son, Jack, helped to conceive and organize the American Heroes Fishing Challenge. The challenge, which brings severely wounded active duty military from Walter Reed and Fort Belvoir military hospitals to New England to compete with 3,000 others in the Martha's Vineyard Striped Bass and Bluefish Derby, was the subject of a documentary Nixon and Guinan Nixon produced and directed.

== Filmography ==
Year	Title	Credit	Medium
2016	"Blue Serengeti" / "Shark Week"	Director, Producer, Writer	Television documentary (episode)
2014	Mission Blue	Director, producer	Feature documentary
2013	American Heroes Saltwater Challenge	Director, producer	Television documentary
2012	Great White Highway/Shark Week	Director, producer	Television documentary (episode)
2007	The Lord God Bird	Producer	Feature documentary
2004	Endangered Species	Director, producer	Feature documentary
1991	The Last Riverman	Director, producer	Feature documentary
1990	America the Beautiful	Director, producer	Television documentary
1989	Amazon Diary	Director, producer	Live action short film
1988	Gorillas in the Mist	Co-producer	Feature film
1988	Sea Turtles: Ancient Nomads	Director, producer	Television documentary
1988	Elephant Diary	Director	Live Action Short Film
1988	With Peter Beard in Africa: Last Word from Paradise	Director	Documentary
1987	If I Can Do This... I Can Do Anything	Director	Documentary
1982	On the Trail of the Giant Panda	Director	Documentary
1980	Fossey's War	Director	Documentary short subject
1980	Japanese Long Line Tuna Fishing	Producer	Television documentary
1978	So Long Lady	Writer	Television documentary
