= Josip Movčan =

Croatian forester

Josip Movčan (February 9, 1924 – June 30, 2016) was a Croatian forester best known for his long-time involvement with the Plitvice Lakes National Park.

Movčan was born in Čakovec. He studied forestry at the University of Sopron in Hungary, Department of Forestry. Later he graduated at the Zagreb University, Department of Forestry. He specialised in exterior design, landscape planning and completed the course with honors.

During 33 years he spent working in the Plitvice Lakes National Park he was creating his attitudes towards the key problems in National Park; He carried out the project "modern system of organized visiting".

He was constantly putting effort on behalf of creative and active protection. He was intensively involved in international events; twice organised European Conference of National Parks on Plitvice Lakes; three times a member of the Board of European National Parks Federation, a member of the National Parks World Committee (CNPPA - IUCN). He held a report at the World Congress in Bali which was later issued by the Royal Swedish Academy of Science.

In 1983 Movčan was elected vice-chairman of the EUROPARC Federation.

He stayed at the Plitvice Lakes National Park as the Protection and Planning Manager until 1991 when he was sent into exile and later retired. From 1992 to 1994 he was at NP "Hohe Tauern" in Austria where he was working on the Management Plan.

Movčan has received the following international awards:

- Van-Tienhoven European Award, Bonn 1983
- Fred M. Packard Award, IUCN / Switzerland 1987
- Global 500, Rio de Janeiro 1992
- Primula d'oro /Uomo e Natura/ Napoli, Italia 1995
