= Barbara Block =

American marine biologist

- Title: Charles & Elizabeth Prothro Professor in Marine Sciences Evolutionary, Cellular and Molecular Physiology
- Awards: Presidential Young Investigator Award

Academic background
- Education: University of Vermont
- Alma mater: Duke University

Academic work
- Discipline: Marine biology
- Sub-discipline: Tuna research and conservation
- Institutions: Stanford University

Barbara Block is an American marine biologist and Charles & Elizabeth Prothro Professor of Biology in Marine Sciences at the Stanford University Hopkins Marine Station and a co-director of Stanford University's Tuna Research and Conservation Center, with the Monterey Bay Aquarium. She has published numerous bodies of work throughout her career in marine biology and chemistry, mainly focusing on the biology and chemistry of metabolism in different tuna and shark species. Additionally, she has helped develop two new types of electronic tags for large pelagic predators in order to track the migrations of large oceanic predator species.

== Biography and career ==
Block began her higher education by obtaining a Bachelor of Arts in Zoology from the University of Vermont in 1980. Under the mentorship of Dr. Francis Carey, a late prominent figure in the study of tuna biology, Block began her oceanographic career at Woods Hole Oceanographic Institution. She continued on to pursue a Ph.D in 1986 at Duke University, until moving onward to becoming a professor herself. She began as an assistant professor at the University of Chicago and joined the Stanford faculty in 1994. Since then, she has spent multiple decades researching oceanic predators and teaching classes, specifically for the Stanford at Sea program. She has also established and lead the Tuna Research and Conservation Center, which is a unique center that focuses on the study of tuna biology and physiology backed by resources from both Stanford University and the Monterey Bay Aquarium.

She currently spends time running the Dr. Barbara Block Lab at the Hopkins Marine Station in Monterey Bay, where she and other researchers are involved with projects such as the Blue Serengeti Initiative, the Tag-A-Giant project, the Animal Telemetry Network, and the management of the Tuna Research and Conservation Center. Involved in the Census of Marine Life, Block was also the Chief Scientist for the Tagging of Pacific Predators program (TOPP). She continues to explore thermal physiology, ecological physiology, tuna biology, and open-ocean predator behavior.

In addition to research and academia, Block has been involved in multiple films and documentaries. She has contributed to the recurring documentary series Nature, and has helped create the documentaries Mission Blue (2014) and Blue Serengeti (2016).

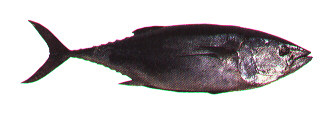
Bluefin tuna

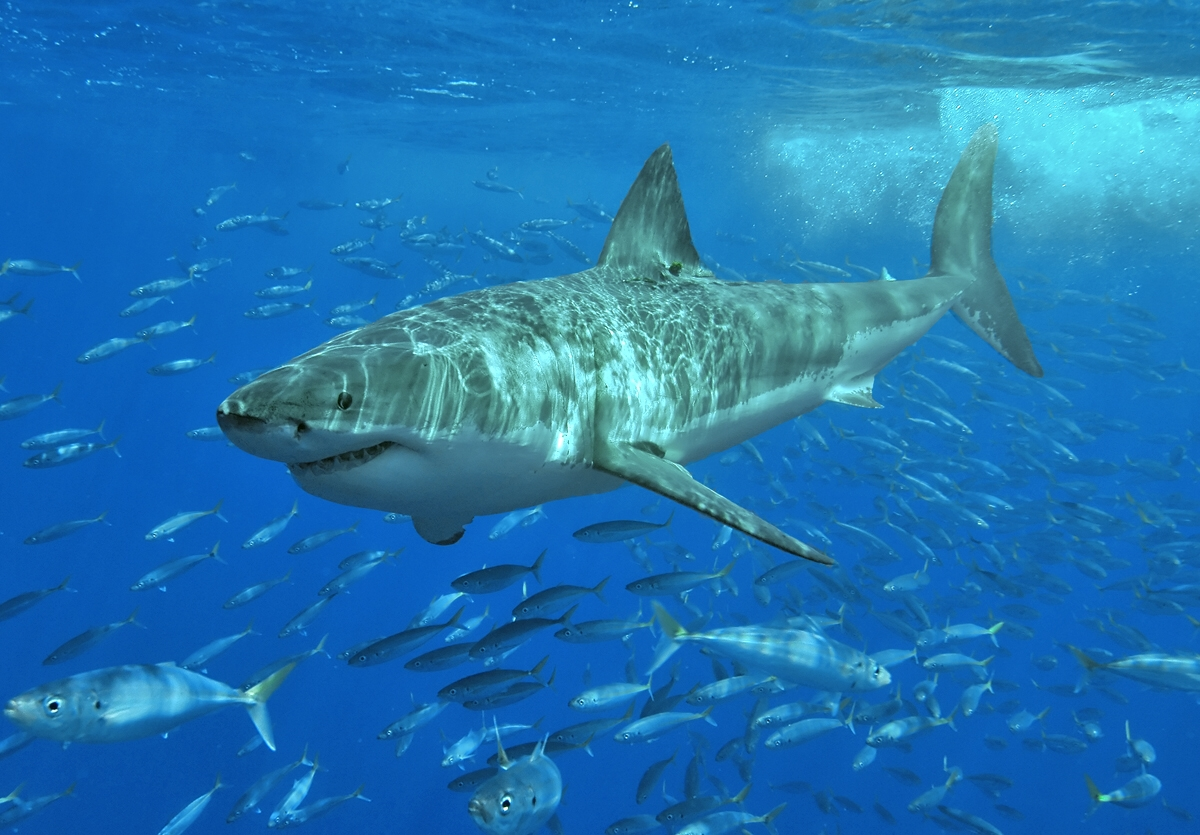
White shark

== Research contributions ==
Block has worked with large pelagic fish, especially open-ocean tuna and billfish, for much of her career. She has done extensive work to improve the quality and scale of tagging operations in order to better analyze large scale movements of these species throughout different oceans. She has specifically contributed to two different new kinds of electronic tags, and has utilized professional relationships with commercial and recreational fishermen to facilitate more efficient tagging processes.

Block's three main types of contributions to research in her field are in tracking large-scale migrations and populations of ocean predators, researching temperature's effect on physiology of large pelagic predators, and investigating the effect of movement on the metabolism of these large ocean species.

=== Migration and population ===
Block's research has added significant contributions to the study of migration and population in oceanic ecosystems. This field is particularly hard to study because of the challenges of effective and ethical tagging of marine species. With new types of electronic tags, Block and her team have been able to not only track distances, but also qualitatively measure the tilt and velocity of the animal. This information has many implications for research, and has been important towards studies that investigate how these animals' physiology changes throughout the duration of a long swim. For example, one study showed that white sharks maintain energy for long distance journeys by using up their lipid reserves in their livers, thereby changing the tilt at which they swim, which can be detected by the electronic tags. In addition, Block has embarked on several projects to track large populations of oceanic predators, resulting in new discoveries of certain population congregations in different locations such as the Caribbean Sea.

=== Temperature and physiology ===
Block has published and helped conduct multiple research studies about the effect of temperature changes on physiology of a variety of species. Temperature can have varying effects on organisms, and is especially hard to study for large oceanic species in the wild, so much of the research must be conducted in controlled environments like in the Tuna Research and Conservation Center, where Block and her team can make specific measurements and observations of bluefin tuna and other large oceanic species. Some of the findings through this research have been in identifying the genes responsible for temperature regulation, and the gene expression controlling those genes.

=== Movement and metabolism ===
To study metabolism in the wild, Block and researchers have been able to use specific types of tags with speed- and temperature-measuring capabilities, where they can make a correlation between the speed of the animal with the amount of oxygen entering through the gills. They can compare this information to the temperature of the environment to determine the rate of metabolism and need for oxygen.

== Awards ==
- Rolex Award for Enterprise, Rolex (2012)
- Walter B. Cannon Award, American Physiological Society (2008)
- Excellence in Science, Peter Benchley Ocean Award (2016)
- Pew Marine Conservation Fellow, Pew Foundation (1997)
- MacArthur Fellow, MacArthur Fellows Program (1996)
- Presidents Medal, Society for Experimental Biology, London (1994)
- Presidential Young Investigator Award, National Science Foundation (1989)

== Works ==
- "Philopatry and migration of Pacific white sharks". Jorgensen SJ, Reeb CA, Chapple TK, Anderson S, Perle C, Van Sommeran SR, Fritz-Cope C, Brown AC, Klimley AP, Block BA. Proc Biol Sci. 2010; 277 (1682): 679-88
- "Seasonal movements, aggregations and diving behavior of Atlantic bluefin tuna (Thunnus thynnus) revealed with archival tags". Walli A, Teo SL, Boustany A, Farwell CJ, Williams T, Dewar H, Prince E, Block BA. PLoS One. 2009; 4 (7): e6151
- "Heterologous hybridization to a complementary DNA microarray reveals the effect of thermal acclimation in the endothermic bluefin tuna (Thunnus orientalis)". Castilho PC, Buckley BA, Somero G, Block BA. Mol Ecol. 2009; 18 (10): 2092-102
- "Effect of thermal acclimation on action potentials and sarcolemmal K+ channels from Pacific bluefin tuna cardiomyocytes". Galli GL, Lipnick MS, Block BA. Am J Physiol Regul Integr Comp Physiol. 2009; 297 (2): R502-9
- "Influence of swimming speed on metabolic rates of juvenile pacific bluefin tuna and yellowfin tuna". Blank JM, Farwell CJ, Morrissette JM, Schallert RJ, Block BA. Physiol Biochem Zool. 2007 Mar-Apr; 80 (2): 167-77
- "Travelling light: white sharks (Carcharodon carcharias) rely on body lipid stores to power ocean-basin scale migration". Proceedings. Biological sciences / The Royal Society Del Raye, G., Jorgensen, S. J., Krumhansl, K., Ezcurra, J. M., Block, B. A.
- "Temperature dependent pre- and postprandial activity in Pacific bluefin tuna (Thunnus orientalis)". Comparative biochemistry and physiology. Part A, Molecular & integrative physiologyGleiss, A. C., Dale, J. J., Klinger, D. H., Estess, E. E., Gardner, L. D., Machado, B., Norton, A. G., Farwell, C., Block, B. A. 2019
- "Movements of pacific bluefin tuna (Thunnus orientalis) in the Eastern North Pacific revealed with archival tags". International Symposium on Climate Impacts on Oceanic Top Predators (CLIOTOP)Boustany, A. M., Matteson, R., Castleton, M., Farwell, C., Block, B. A.
