= Donald Lamberton =

Australian economist

Donald McLean Lamberton AO (29 July 1927 – 28 November 2014) was an Australian economist. His work focused on information economics.

== Early life and career ==
Lamberton grew up in New South Wales. Homeschooled until the age of eleven, he went to work at the Bank of New South Wales in May 1942, aged just fourteen years. He earned a degree in economics from the University of Sydney in 1949. He then worked for the Sydney Morning Herald as a financial journalist and the Sydney Stock Exchange in research and statistics.

== Academic positions ==
In 1953, Lamberton joined the University of New England as a lecturer. With funding from the Australian War Services Canteen Trust Fund, he moved to the University of Oxford in 1957 to read for his PhD at Merton College. His thesis "The Theory of Profit" was accepted in 1962 and published in 1965. Concurrently, he was a senior lecturer (later, associate professor) at the University of New South Wales from 1960 to 1969. In 1966 he visited the United States as a Fulbright scholar at the University of Pittsburgh and Stanford University until 1967.

From 1969 to 1972, Lamberton was a professor at Case Western Reserve University and then, from 1973 to 1989, a chair in economics at the University of Queensland. From 1989 to 1992 he worked in Melbourne as co-director of the Centre for International Research on Communications and Information Technologies. Lamberton was at the Australian National University from 1992 to 2004, in their Urban Research Programme and Public Policy Programme. In 2005 he moved to the Queensland University of Technology.

== Writing ==
He authored over 20 books, 60 book chapters, 40 articles, and 30 reports, including:

=== Books edited ===
- Industrial Economies, 1971
- Economics of Information and Knowledge, Penguin, 1971
- The Information Revolution, 1974
- The Trouble with Technology (with Ken Boulding), 1983
- The Economics of Language, 2002

=== Journals edited ===
In 1983 he founded Prometheus and was general editor for most of the rest of his life.

== Writing about his work ==
A festschrift honoring his work was published in 1999. In December 2015, the journal Prometheus published a special issue of papers written by his students.

== Awards ==
In 2006 he was made an Officer of the Order of Australia for "service to economics, as a leading academic and researcher in the field of information economics through the multidisciplinary study of the impact of technology, information and society on economic development".
