= Penelope Figgis =

Australian Environmentalist

Penelope Figgis AO
- Born: 1949 (age 76–77)
- Education: University of Sydney

Penelope Figgis AO is an Australian environmentalist, activist, and political scientist. Since 2005 she has been the Vice Chair for Oceania of the IUCN World Commission on Protected Areas.

Figgis' research and areas of interest include national and international protected areas, biodiversity conservation policy, World Heritage, sustainable tourism, natural resource management, private land conservation and public open space management.

== Early life and education ==
Penelope Figgis's involvement with nature conservation advocacy began as a student in the late 1970s, when she campaigned heavily for the Wollemi National Park in NSW and the NSW Rainforests.

In 1979 she graduated Bachelor of Arts (First Class Honours) in Government and Public Administration, University of Sydney, with the thesis titled The Politics of Wilderness Conservation: The Movement and the Issues.

From 1981-1984 she was national lobbyist in Canberra for the Australian Conservation Foundation, where she played a major role in the campaign for the Franklin River.

== Career ==
As an inaugural Board Member of the Sydney Olympic Park Authority (from 1 July 2001), she took on the role of chairing the Parklands Advisory Committee, making recommendations regarding the care and management of the Millennium Parklands.

During her time with the World Commission on Protected Areas (WCPA), the Federal Environmental Minister announced a fivefold increase from 2008 for National Reserve System funding and increased funding for Indigenous land and sea management. Such funding had been a long term goal of the WCPA.

On Australia Day 2006, she was recognised for her service to the environment and nature conservation by becoming an Officer of the Order of Australia. The award was granted for her contributions to environmental organisations, public authorities and policy development in biodiversity conservation, protected areas and sustainable tourism.

She served on the 2008 NSW Ministerial Inquiry into Tourism and National Parks.

In 2008 she was selected to participate in the Australia 2020 Summit under the Population, sustainability, climate change and water working group.

From 2010 to 2014 she was the Executive Director of the Australian Committee of the International Union for the Conservation of Nature (ACIUCN), during which time she led the revitalisation of ACIUCN.

In 2017 she joined the Advisory Council of Future Earth Australia, Australian Academy of Science.

== Statutory Bodies ==
- Uluru National Park Board of Management Board Member, 1985–91
- Australian Tourist Commission Board Member, 1988–93
- Landcare Australia Ltd. Board Member, 1989–93
- Great Barrier Reef Consultative Committee Member, 1996–1998
- Commission for the Future Commissioner, 1991
- Environmental Protection Authority of N.S.W. Board Member, 1992-2000
- Sydney Olympics Park Authority Board Member, 2001-2011
- Sydney Olympics Park Parklands Advisory Committee Chair 2001-2011
- Jenolan Caves Reserve Trust Board Member, 2001- 2004
- Northern Territory Parks and Wildlife Advisory Board Member, 2005–2009

== Environmental Organisations ==
- Australian Conservation Foundation Councillor 1985-86, 1987–89; Vice President 1991- 2005; Honorary Life Member 2005; Patron 2005-2013
- Australian Bush Heritage Fund Foundation Board Member 1995-2003
- National Parks Association of the Northern Territory Vice President, 1985–86
- Nature Conservation Council of NSW Vice-Chair, 1990–93
- People and Parks Foundation, Board Member, 2006 -2007

== Honours and awards ==
- Officer of the Order of Australia (AO) for service to the environment and nature conservation through contributions to environmental organisations, public authorities and policy development in biodiversity conservation, protected areas and sustainable tourism, 26 January 2006.
- Member of the Order of Australia (AM) in recognition of service to the environment and conservation, 26 January 1994.
- The Centenary Medal, for outstanding service to the community through environmental protection, 1 January 2001.
- Sir Edmund Hillary Award for Parks, Parks Forum 2010.
- Honorary Life Membership, Australian Committee for the International Union for Conservation of Nature (ACIUCN), 2014
- Chair's Award, IUCN World Commission on Protected Areas for a lifetime dedicated to conservation and for services to the World Commission on Protected Areas, 2016.

== Selected publications ==
- Figgis, Penelope (Ed) (1985) Rainforests of Australia, Kevin Weldon, Sydney reprinted 1989, 1992.
- Figgis, Penelope and Mosley, J.G., (1988) Australia's Wilderness Heritage: World Heritage Areas, Kevin Weldon, reprinted 1989, 1992.
- Figgis, Penelope, (1999) Australia’s National Parks and Protected Areas: Future Directions, ACIUCN Occasional Paper Number 8, Australian Committee for International Union for the Conservation of Nature,.
- Figgis, Penelope, (2004) Conservation on Private Land: the Australian Experience, IUCN, Gland Switzerland and Cambridge, UK 2004.
- Taylor, M. & Figgis, P.(eds) (2007) Protected Areas: Buffering Nature Against Climate Change, Proceedings of a WWF and IUCN World Commission on Protected Areas Symposium, 18–19 June 2007, Canberra. WWF, Sydney.
- Figgis, Penelope and Mackey, Brendan (Eds). 2011. The Role of Biodiversity and Ecosystems in Climate Change Mitigation, Symposium Report, Australian Committee for IUCN, Sydney.
- Figgis, P. Fitzsimons J. & Irving J. (Eds) (2012). Innovation for 21st Century Conservation, Australian Committee for IUCN, Sydney.
- Australian Committee for IUCN, (2013). Conserving Australia’s Marine Environment: Key Directions Statement, Australian Committee for IUCN, Sydney
- Figgis, P., Leverington, A., Mackay, R., Maclean, A., Valentine, P., (Eds) (2013). Keeping the Outstanding Exceptional; the Future of World Heritage in Australia, Australian Committee for IUCN, Sydney.
- Figgis, P., Mackay, B. Fitzsimons, J. Irving, J. And Clarke, P. (Eds) (2015). Valuing Nature; Protected Areas and Ecosystem Services. Australian Committee for IUCN, Sydney
- Zischka K, Figgis P, Dovers S. and Debus B. (Eds) (2017). Maintaining Australia’s Natural Wealth: Priorities for Terrestrial Conservation. Australian Committee for IUCN, Sydney.
