= Peter Kneeshaw =

Australian organist

Peter Thornton Kneeshaw AM is an Australian organist.

== Career ==
Kneeshaw was the organist of Christ Church St Laurence from 1980 until 1988, and then went on to serve as the Principal Organist of St Mary’s Cathedral, Sydney from 1988 to 2010. Kneeshaw has worked with some of Australia’s most prestigious performing artists, including Sydney Philharmonia Choirs, the Song Company and the Sydney Male Choir, as well as accompanying prestigious performances and recordings including the annual performance of Handel’s Messiah at the Sydney Town Hall.

== Honours ==
Kneeshaw was inducted into the Order of Australia in 2006 “for service to music and to the community as an organist and choirmaster, and as an adviser in organ design and restoration.”
