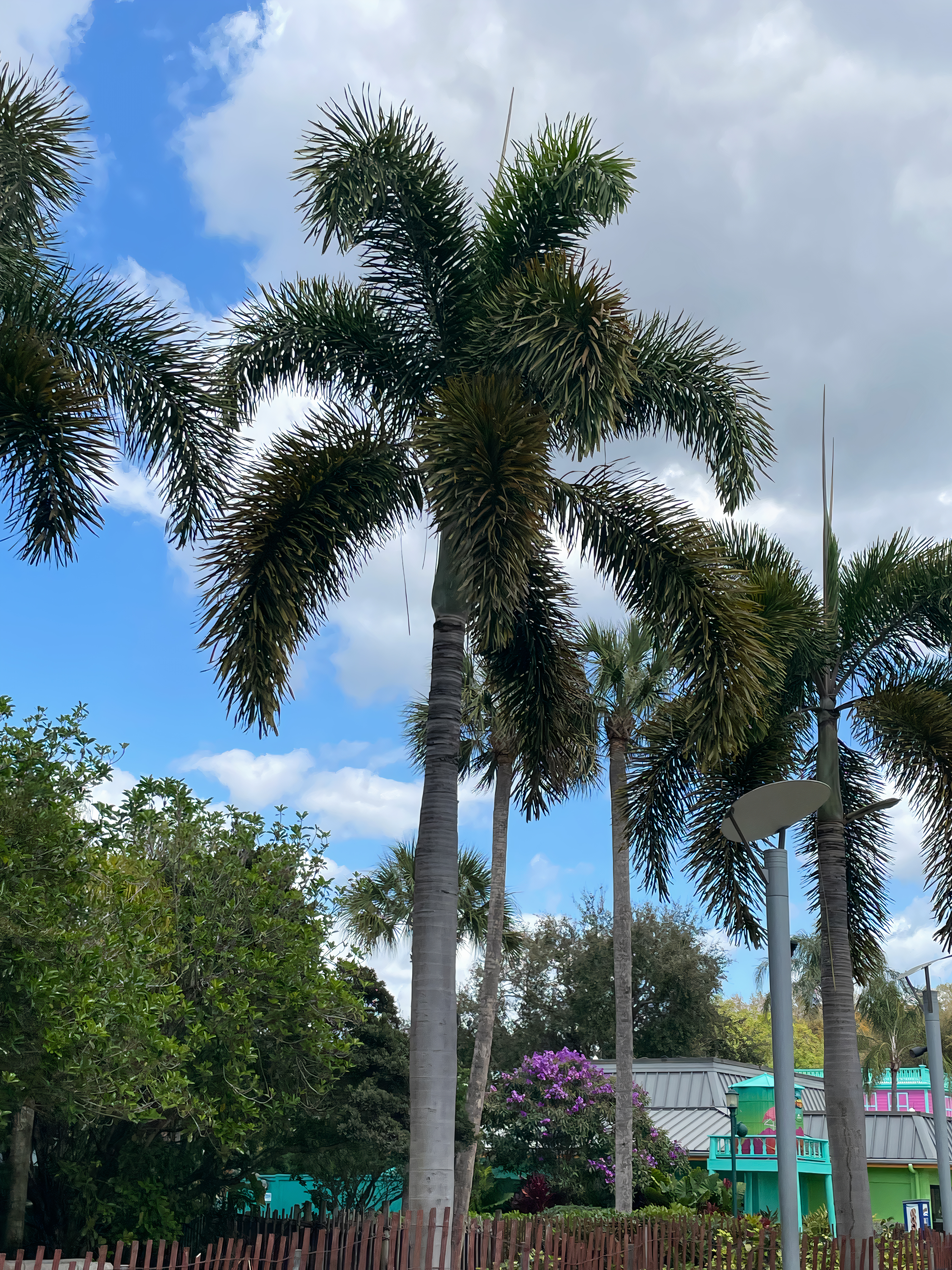

Conservation status
- Conservation Dependent (IUCN 2.3)

Scientific classification
- Kingdom: Plantae
- Clade: Embryophytes
- Clade: Tracheophytes
- Clade: Spermatophytes
- Clade: Angiosperms
- Clade: Monocots
- Clade: Commelinids
- Order: Arecales
- Family: Arecaceae
- Subfamily: Arecoideae
- Tribe: Areceae
- Subtribe: Ptychospermatinae
- Genus: Wodyetia; A.K.Irvine
- Species: W. bifurcata

Binomial name
- Wodyetia bifurcata A.K.Irvine
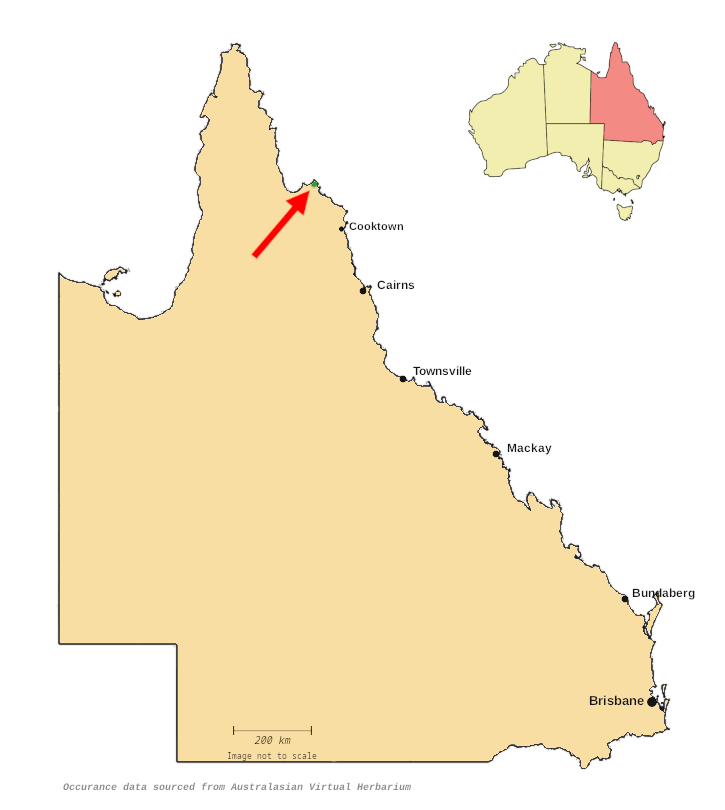

= Wodyetia =

Genus of palms

Wodyetia is a genus of the palm family Arecaceae, containing the single species Wodyetia bifurcata. The species, commonly known as foxtail palm, is native to a very small area of northeastern Queensland, Australia, but has been widely cultivated around the world.

== Description ==
The foxtail palm is a single-stemmed palm growing to a height of 6 to 15 m (20 to 49 ft) tall and up to 25 cm (9.8 in) diameter. The trunk is light grey, smooth (without spines), somewhat bottle- or spindle-shaped, and marked by annular leaf scars. There are about 6–10 fronds in the crown of a mature tree, and they grow to about 3 m (9.8 ft) in length with a petiole about 90 cm (35 in) long and a leaf sheath about 120 cm (47 in) long. The leaflets are divided into numerous segments (as many as 950), which are arranged radially around the midrib, giving the frond a 'bushy' appearance.

This species is monoecious, meaning that individual flowers are either pistillate (functionally female), or staminate (functionally male), but both types are produced by each plant. Flowers are carried on a panicle that emerges from the base of the crownshaft, it may be up to 165 cm (65 in) long. Numerous flowers are clustered together in groups of three, each group with one female and two male flowers. They measure about 25 mm (1 in) diameter (including the petals), and have three yellow-green petals and three green sepals.

The fruit is a drupe up to 6.5 cm (2.6 in) long and 5 cm (2 in) wide, orange-red when ripe. It contains a single large seed coated in a hard but fibrous, black mesocarp.

== Taxonomy ==
The foxtail palm was unknown to botanists and horticulturalists as late 1968, when two employees of the Queensland Department of Forestry found it during a survey of the Melville Range. One of the men, Bernard Hyland, returned to the site seven years later and collected the first specimens of the tree. In 1982 botanist Anthony Kyle Irvine also collected specimens from the area, and he set about describing the plant. He created a new genus, Wodyetia, to accommodate the plant, and his work was published in 1983 in the journal of the International Palm Society, Principes.

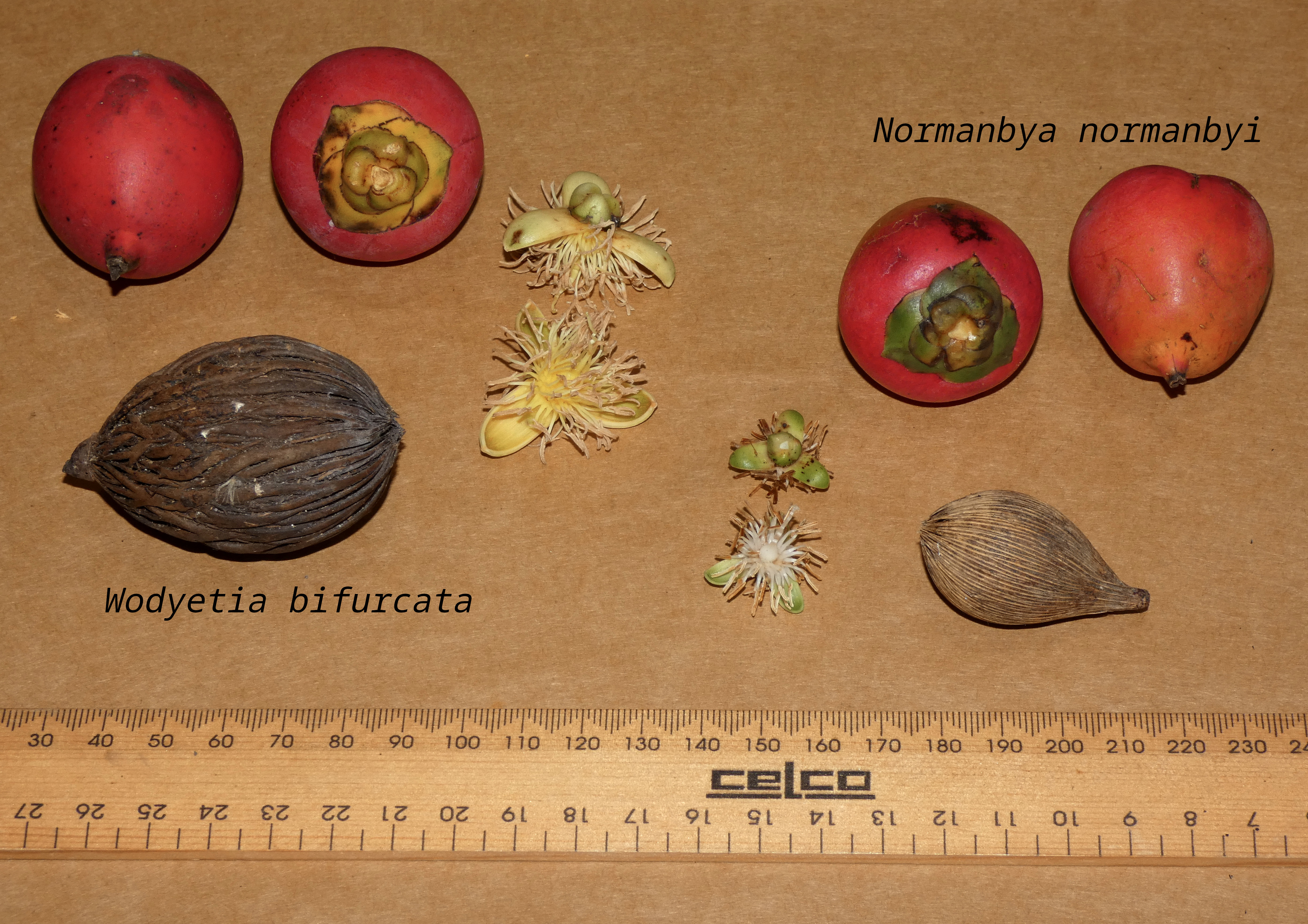
Comparison of flowers and fruit of Wodyetia bifurcata and Normanbya normanbyi

Wodyetia is placed in the subfamily Arecoideae, tribe Areceae, subtribe Ptychospermatinae. Its nearest relatives include two other monotypic genera that are endemic to Australia, Carpentaria and Normanbya. The latter is very similar to this taxon, and it has been speculated that Wodyetia and Normanbya may be merged into a single genus at some point in the future.

=== Etymology ===
The generic name Wodyetia is derived from the name of the last aboriginal man, Wodyeti, with knowledge of the plants in the Cape Melville area. The species epithet bifurcata means 'divided in two', and refers to the divided leaflets of the fronds as well as the forked fibres that surround the seed.

== Distribution and habitat ==
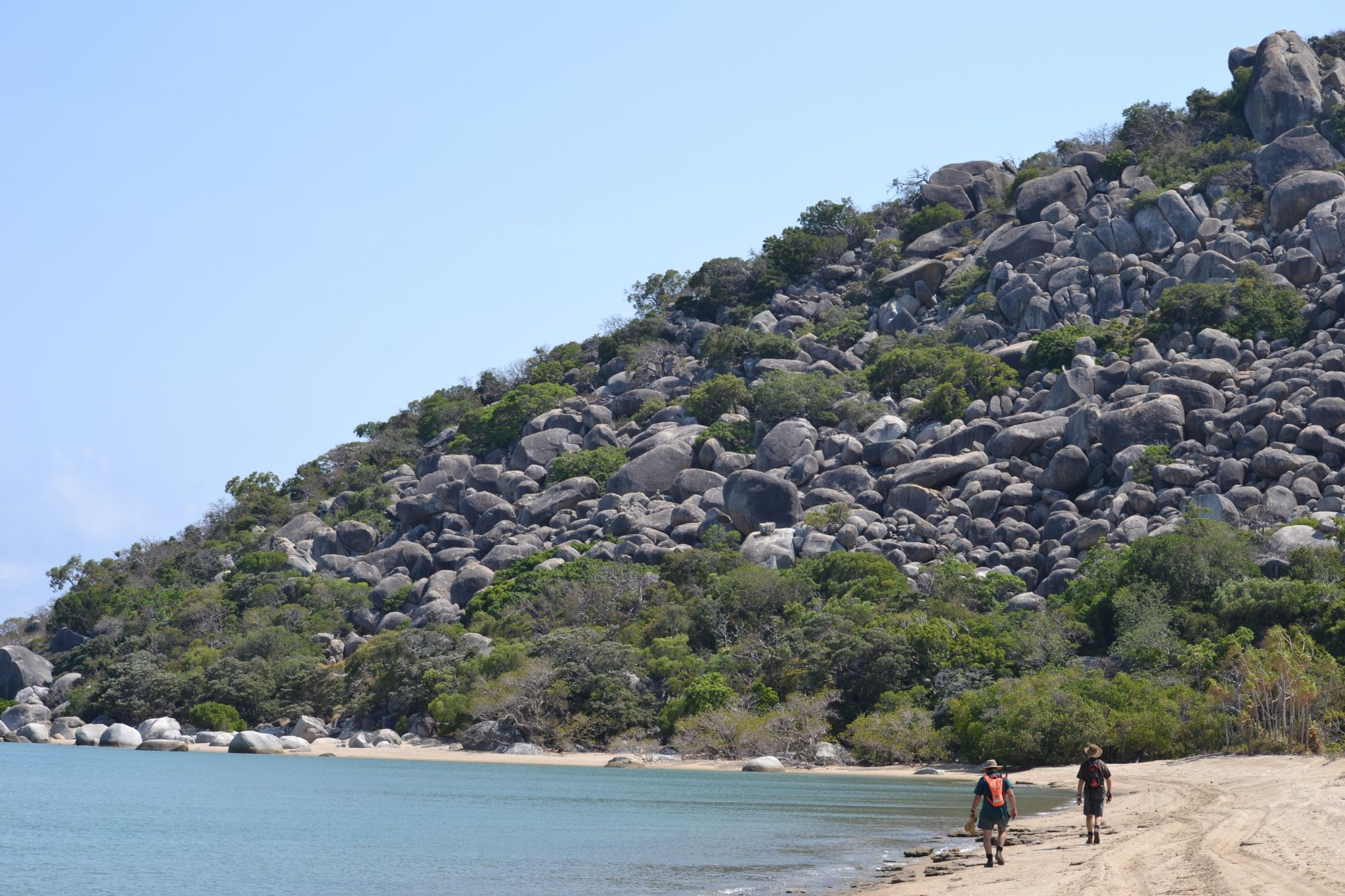
The boulder-strewn landscape of Cape Melville

This species is endemic to the Cape Melville range, within the Cape Melville National Park in Queensland Australia. The Park is extremely remote and difficult to access. It is about 475 km (295 mi) by road north of Cairns, the nearest major population centre, much of that distance is on very challenging unsealed roads.

The foxtail palm grows amongst massive granite boulders on southern slopes of the Cape, in vine thickets with adjacent rainforest. They occur on course sandy soils and are the dominant species within their communities. Co-occurring species include Buchanania arborescens, Ficus obliqua, Ficus benjamina, Myristica insipida, and climbers such as Capparis and Cissus species. Near the base of the slopes it grows alongside Eucalyptus polycarpa (now Corymbia polycarpa), Eucalyptus drepanophylla (now E. crebra), Bombax ceiba and Cochlospermum gillivraei. The altitudinal range is small, from near sea level to about 400 m (1,300 ft).

== Conservation ==
After it was described by Irvine in 1982, the foxtail palm became very much in demand for landscaping. Since it only occurred naturally in a very remote location and was subject to protection laws, a thriving black market trade arose, with the actions of illegal collectors threatening to ravage native populations. In 1982 Irvine sent seeds to a few horticulturalists in anticipation of, and an attempt to allay, the demand that would follow the publication of this new species. In 1988, a paper was published which cited a Brisbane-based nursery grower, stating that a single seed was selling in Australia for up to A$5, which equates to about $14 in October 2025. In the decades since then, it has been cultivated widely, both in Queensland and around the world, to the point where it is easily and legally available worldwide. As of October 2025, more than 1,500 foxtail palms have been planted in the streets and parks of the far northern Queensland city of Cairns.

The International Union for Conservation of Nature (IUCN) last assessed this species in 1998, and gave it a rating of "Lower Risk/conservation dependent". That rating is specified in version 2.3 of the IUCN's rating system, which is now superseded by version 3.1. The IUCN's webpage for the foxtail palm has the annotation 'Needs updating', but does not provide a timeframe for it. In Queensland, where it is native, the species is assessed as near threatened as of October 2025 under the Nature Conservation Act 1992. It has not been listed in the Australian Government's Species Profile and Threats Database under the Environment Protection and Biodiversity Conservation Act 1999.

== Ecology ==
The area has been recognised for its rich biocultural diversity, having long and intense Aboriginal associations and a rich biodiversity.

== Gallery ==
Stem and foliage
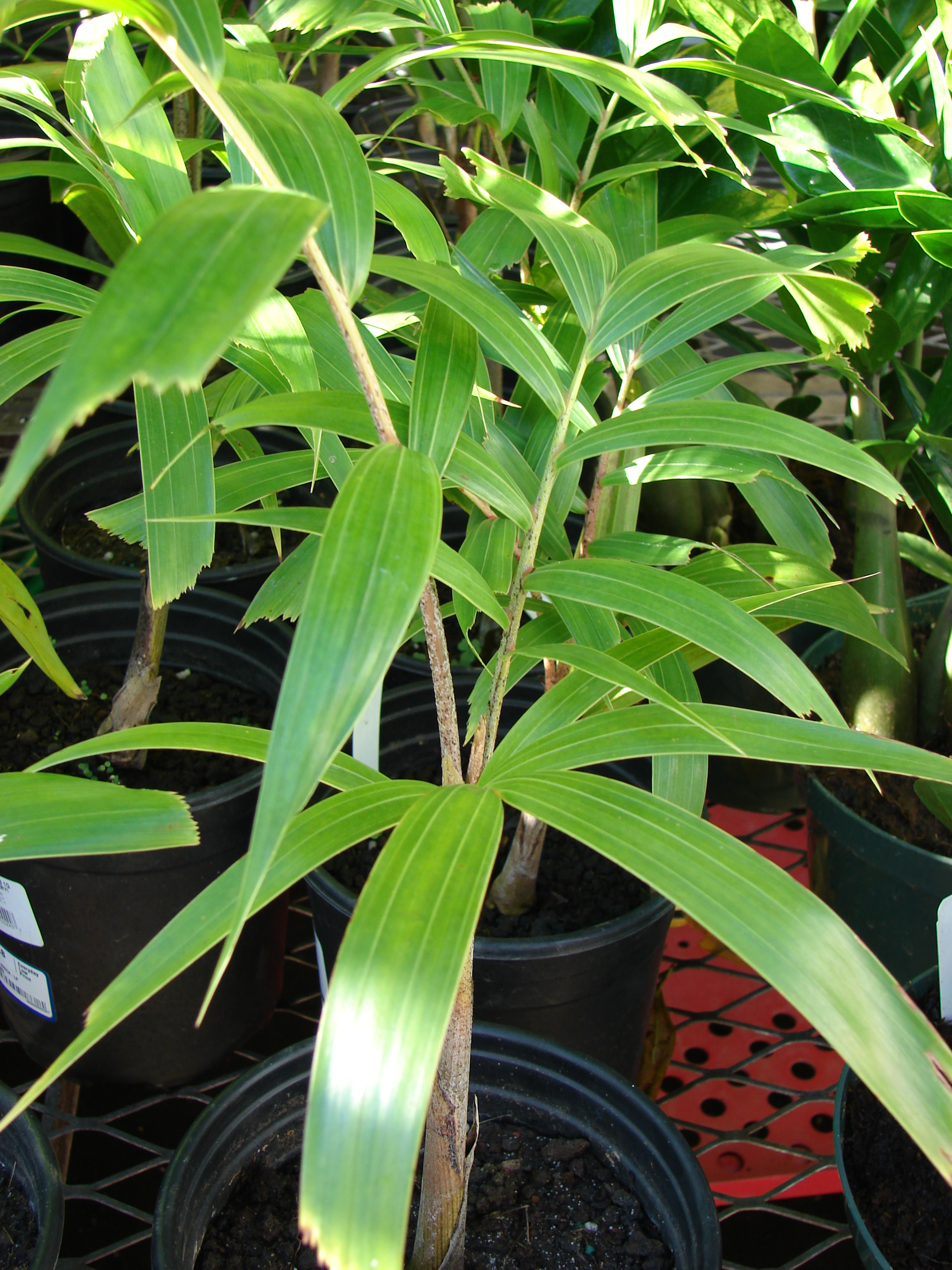
Seedling

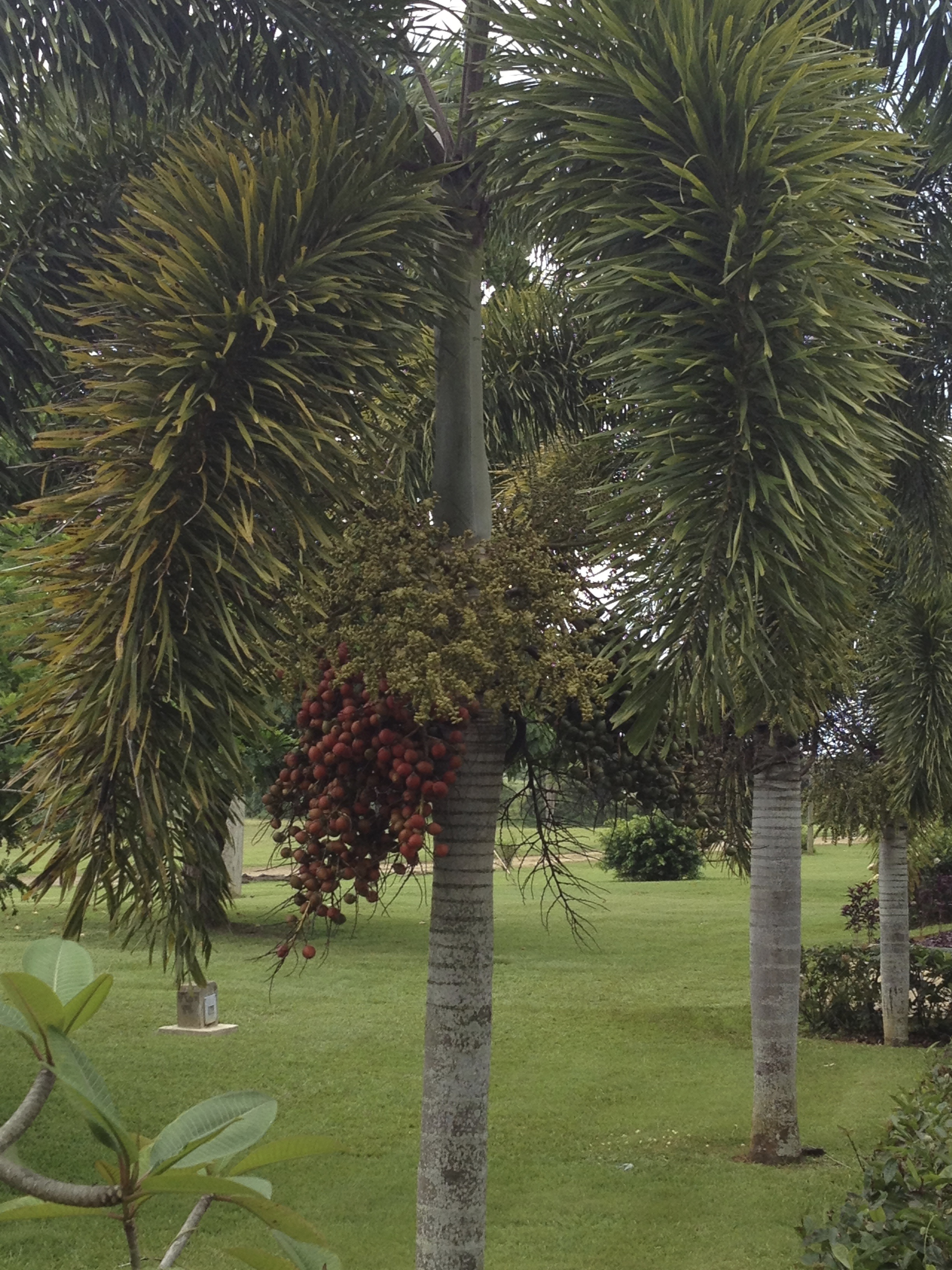
Maturing trees

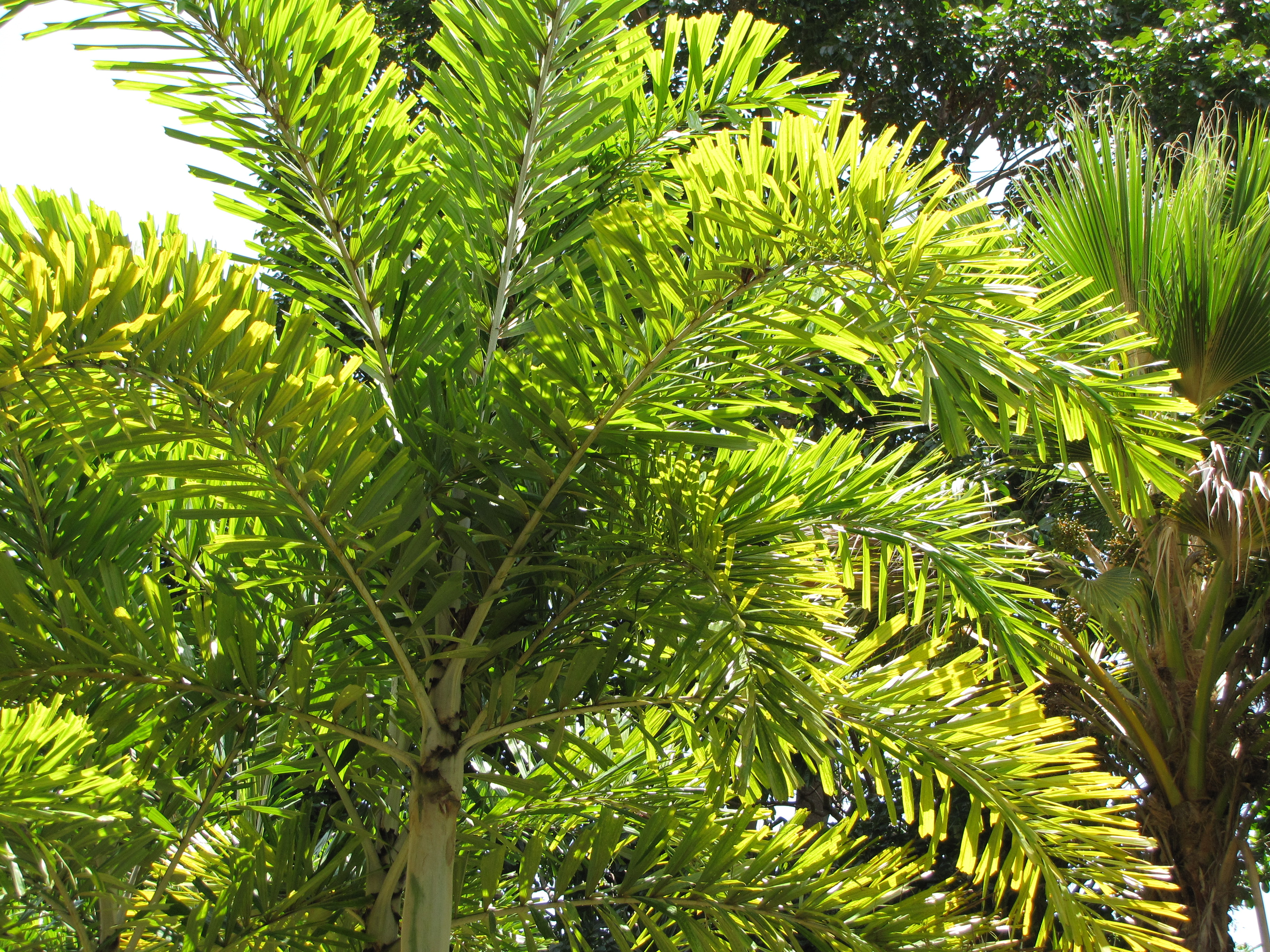
Crown

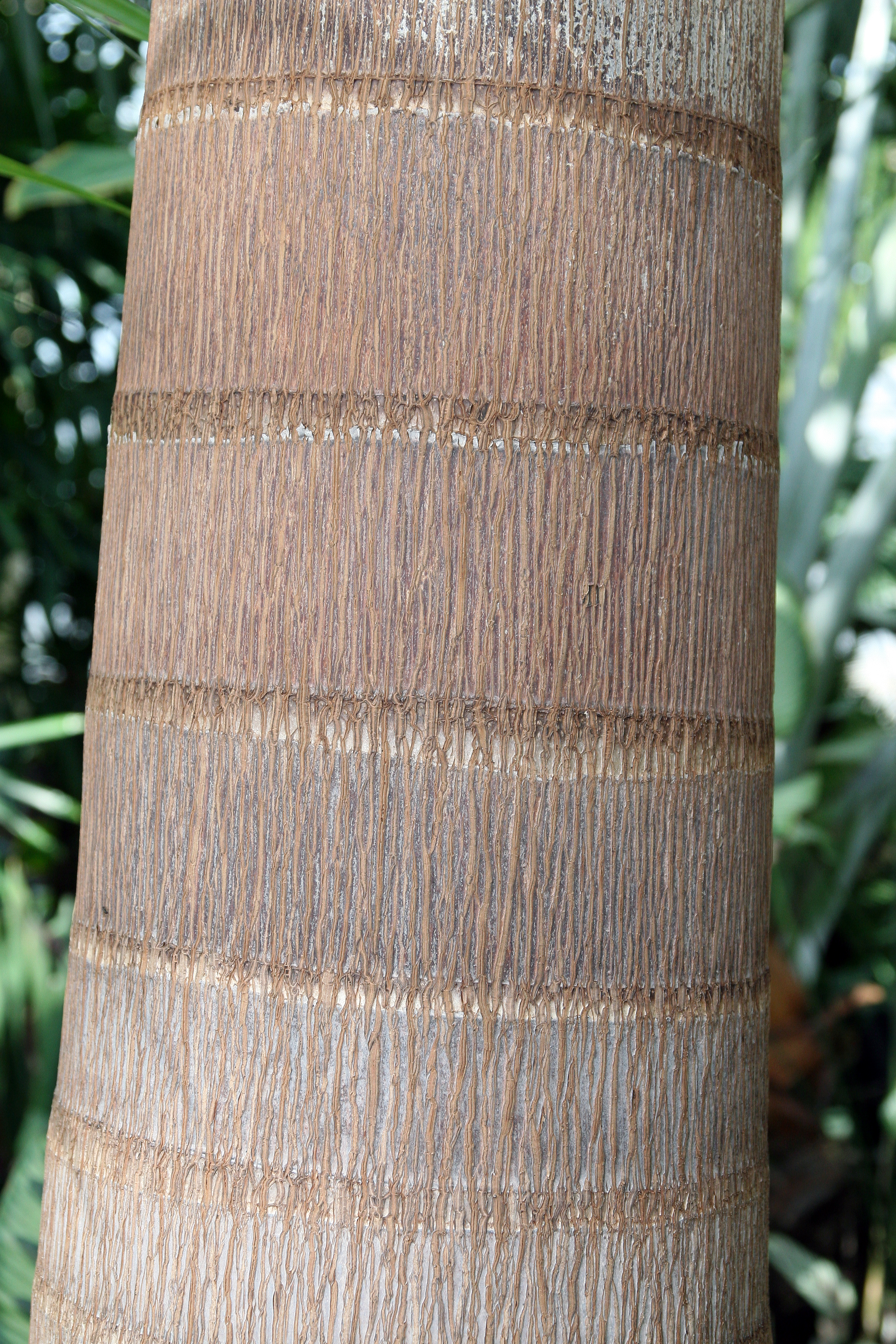
Trunk

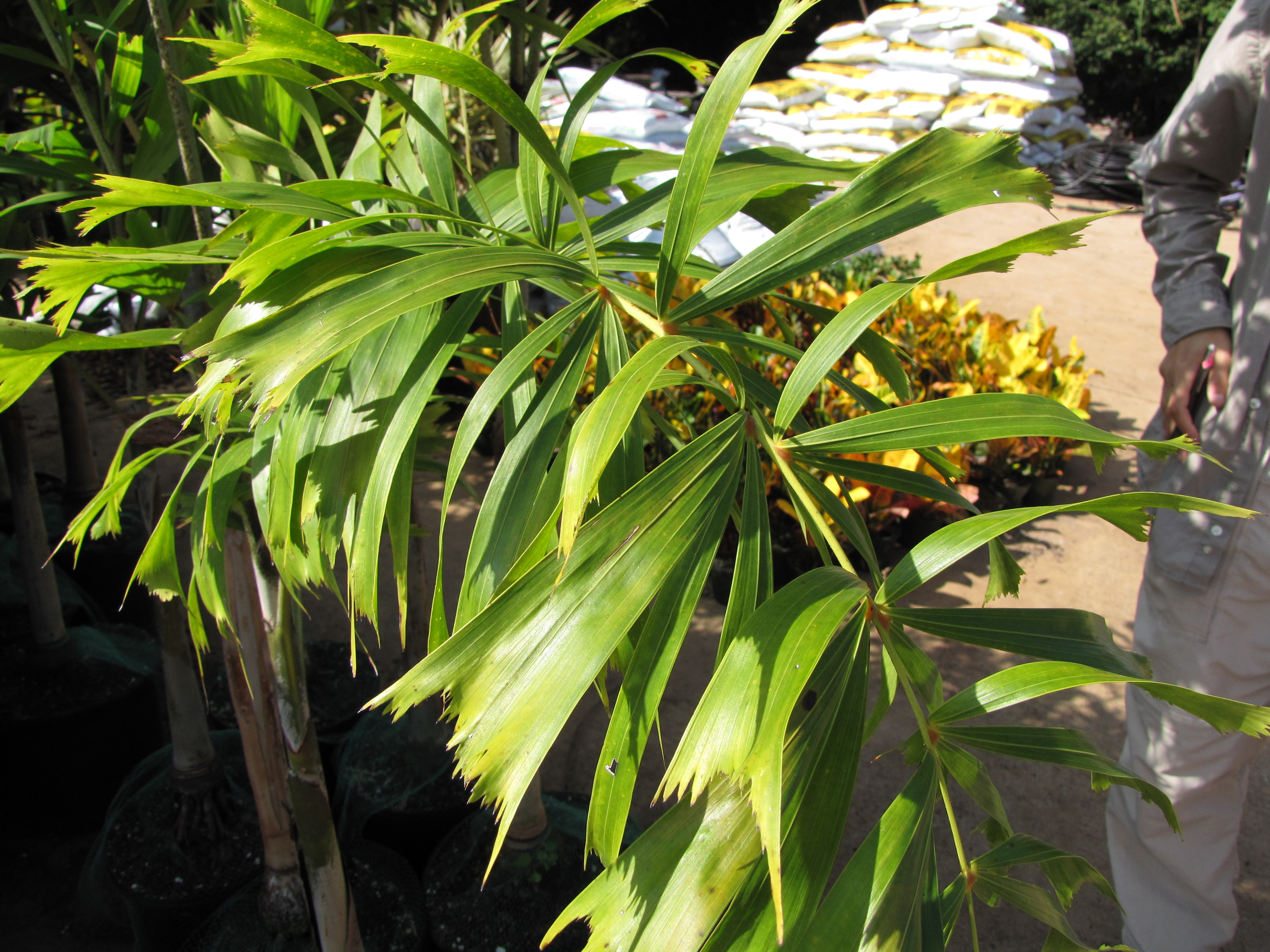
Detail of leaflets
Flowers and fruit
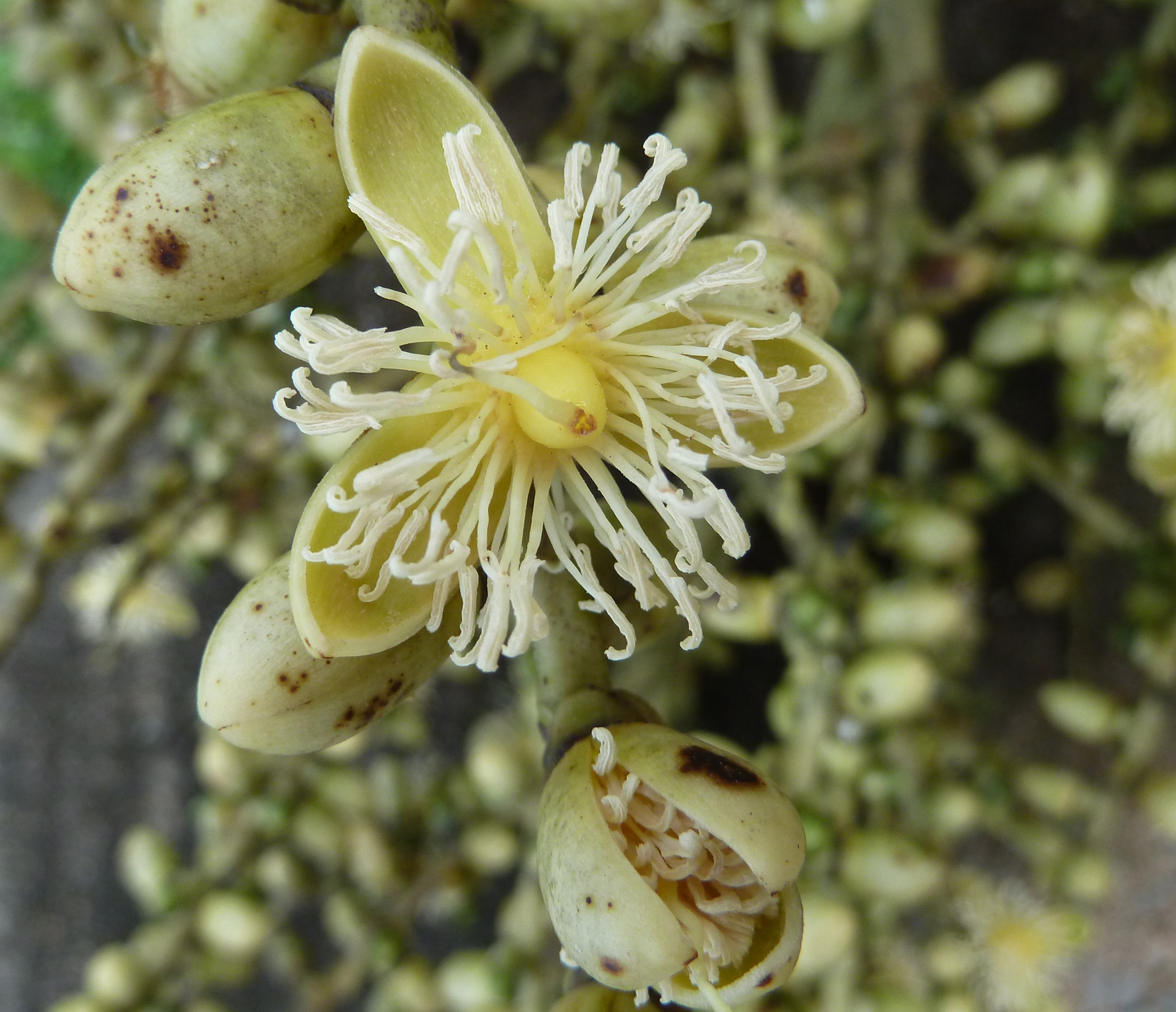
Male flower

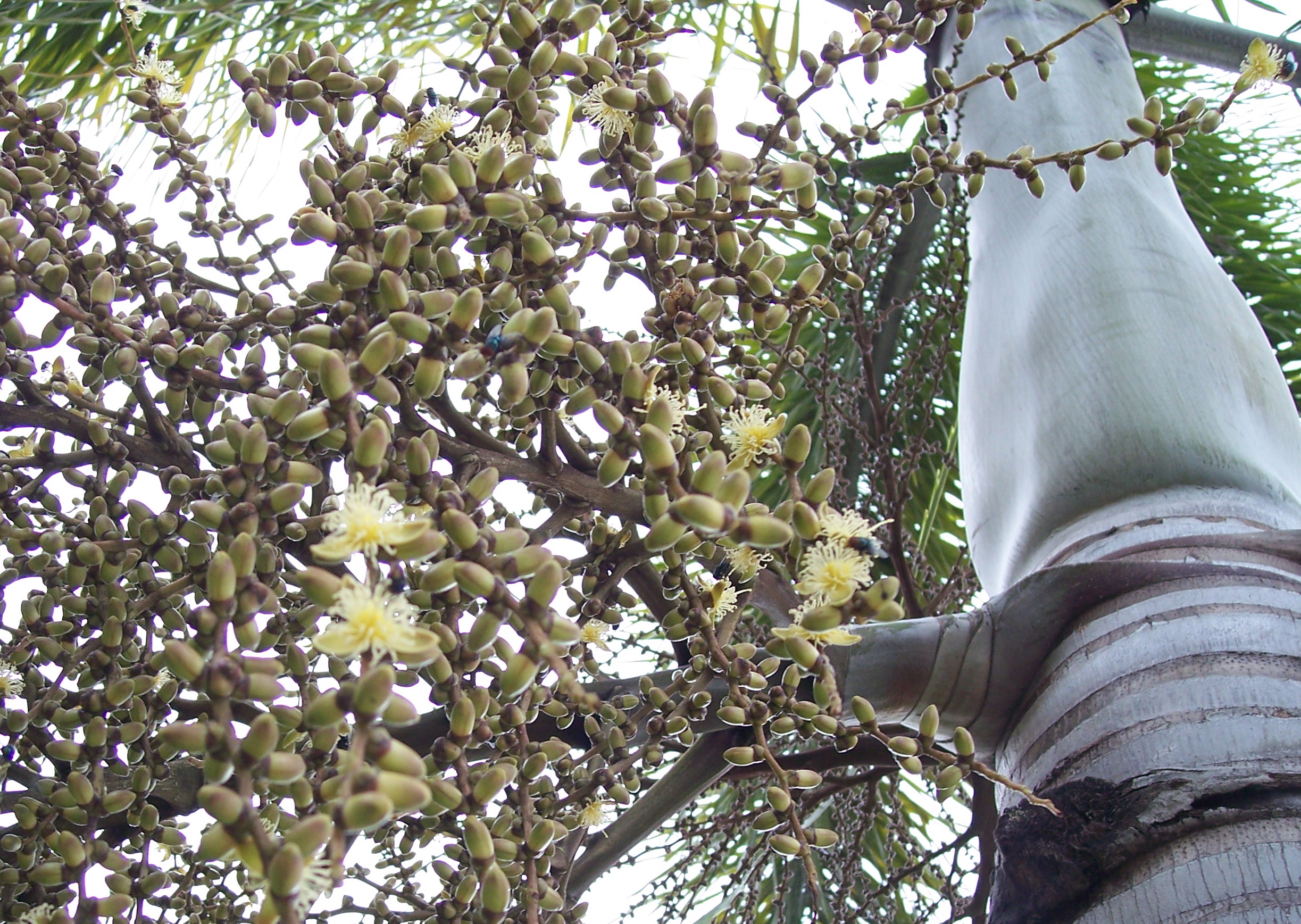
Buds and flowers

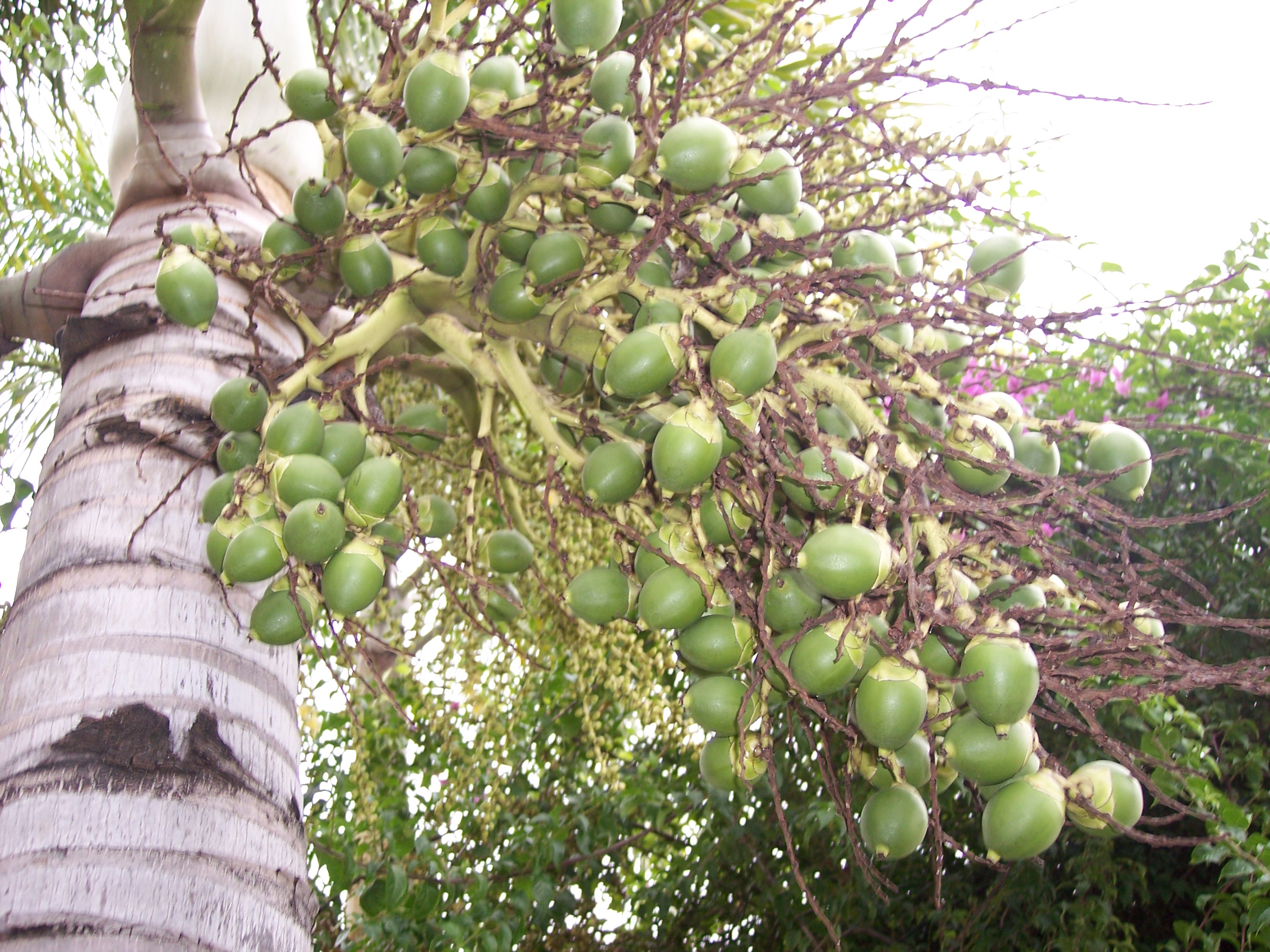
Immature fruit

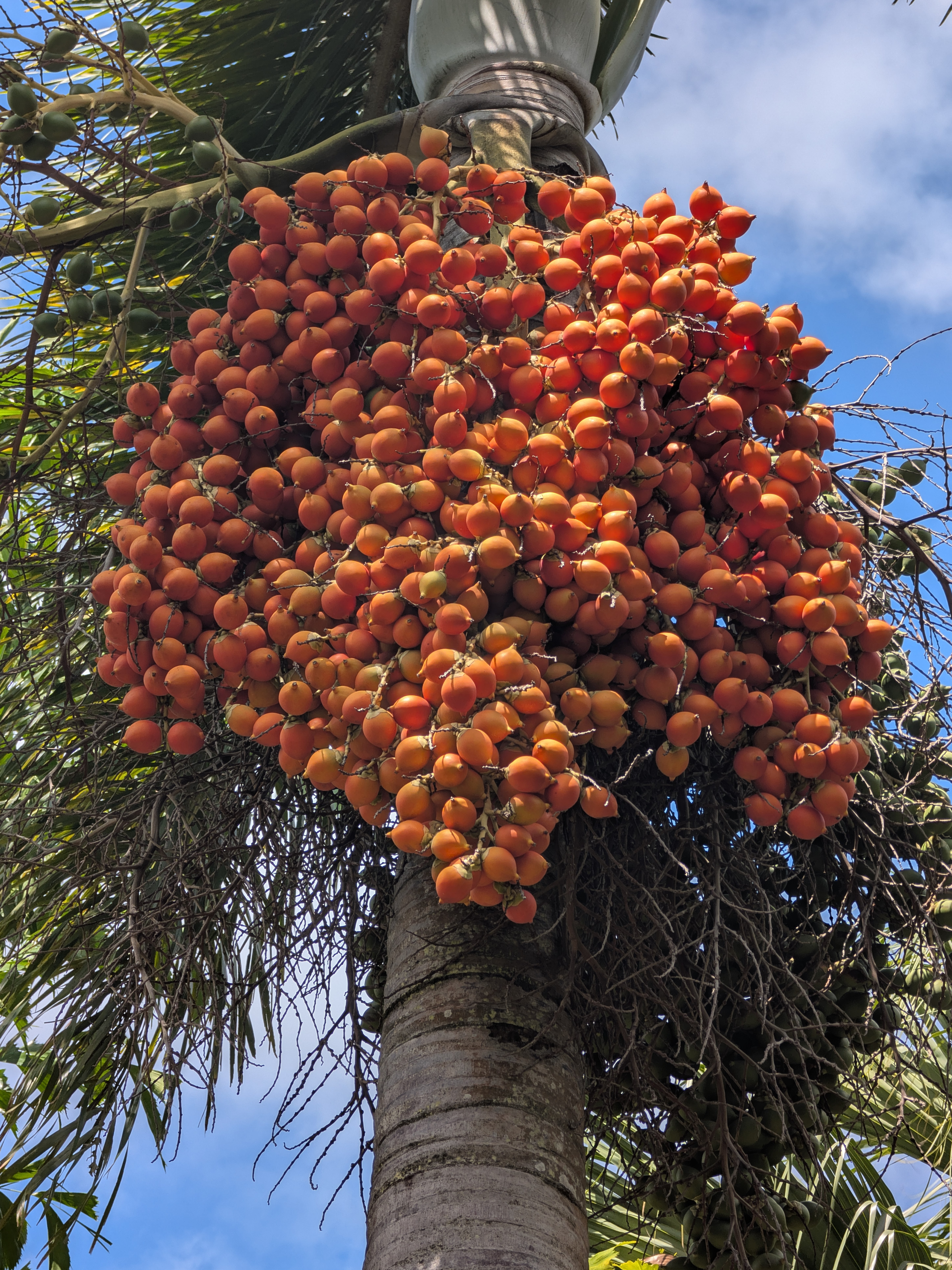
Ripe fruit

== See also ==
- Queensland's 1993 Cape Melville affair involved the alleged theft of foxtail palms from a national park
