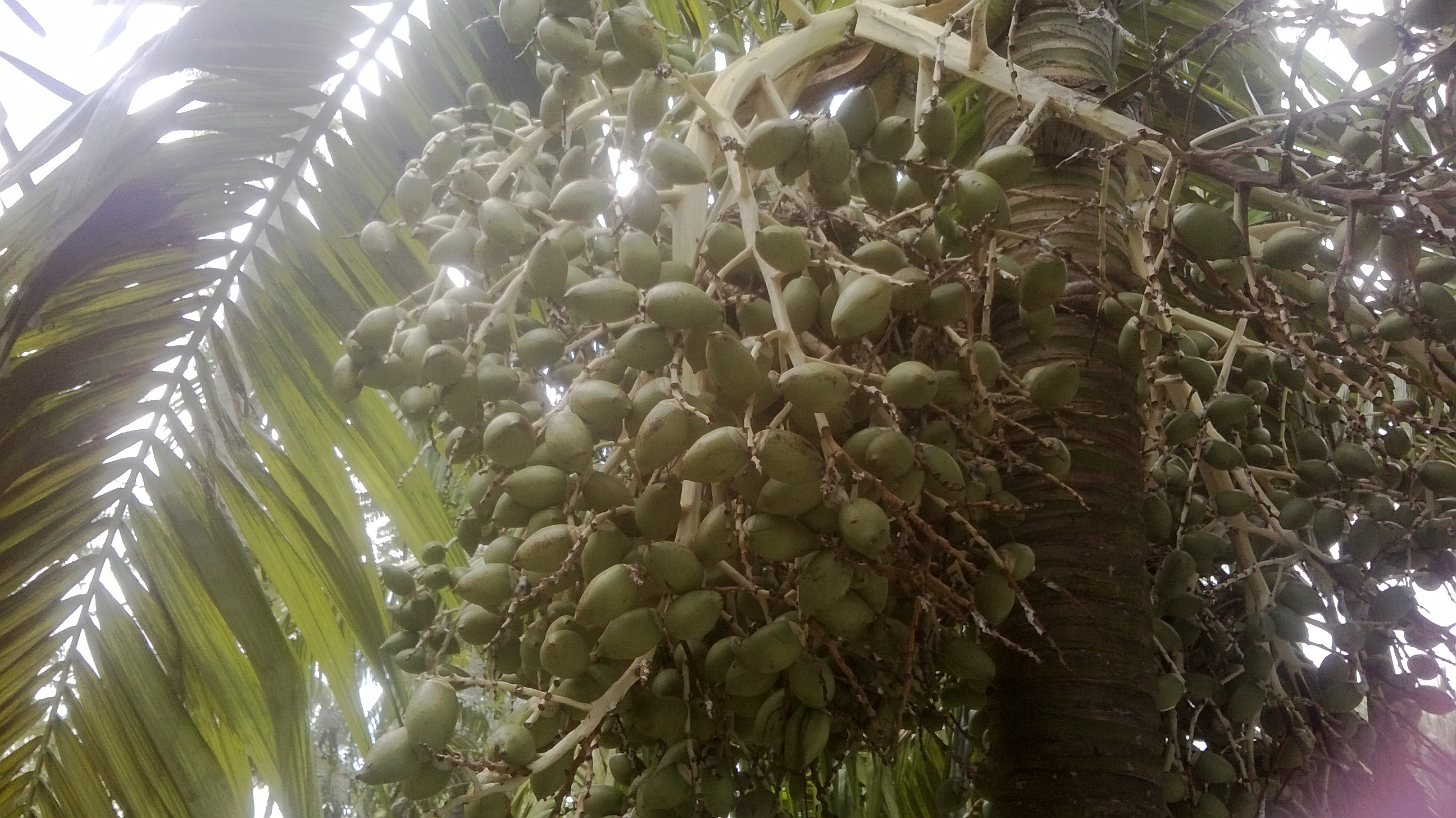
- Ptychococcus paradoxus fruits

Scientific classification
- Kingdom: Plantae
- Clade: Tracheophytes
- Clade: Angiosperms
- Clade: Monocots
- Clade: Commelinids
- Order: Arecales
- Family: Arecaceae
- Subfamily: Arecoideae
- Tribe: Areceae
- Subtribe: Ptychospermatinae
- Genus: Ptychococcus; Becc.

Species
- Ptychococcus lepidotus; Ptychococcus paradoxus

= Ptychococcus =

Genus of palms

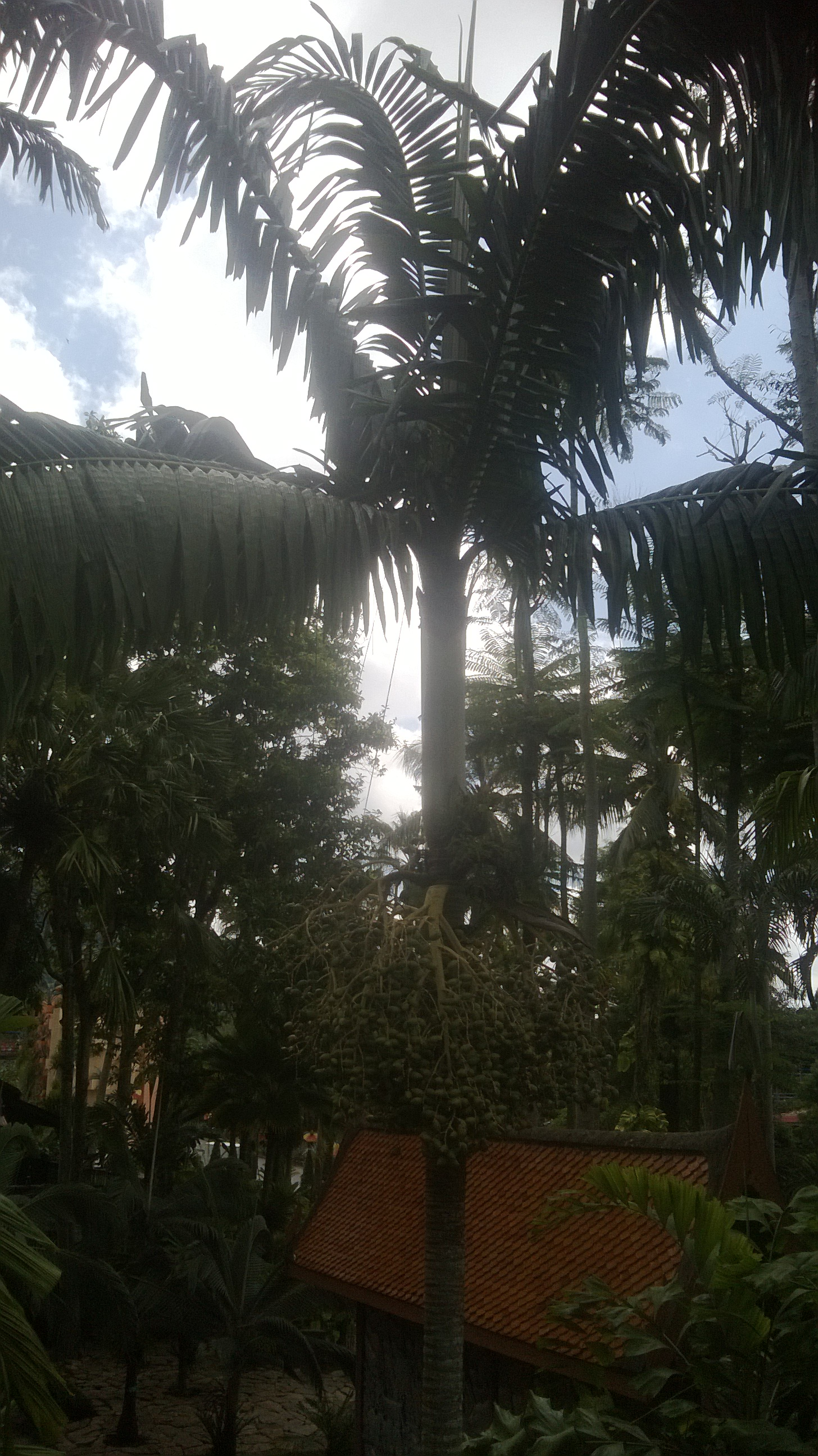
Ptychococcus paradoxus. Nong Nooch Tropical Garden, Thailand.

Ptychococcus is a monoecious genus of flowering plant in the palm family from New Guinea and the Solomon Islands. They are closely related to Ptychosperma, only differentiated by the seed shape and endocarp type. The name is a combination of the Greek for "fold" and the Latin for "berry".

== Description ==
The trunks grow to 15 m, usually no wider than 25 cm, and both are solitary, ringed, and crownshafted. The leaf is pinnately compounded, in long sheaths, usually covered in scales and hairs, as is the short petiole. The ridged rachis is flattened on the bottom and also covered in hairy tomentum. The unusual leaflets are once-folded and toothed, twisting upwards in their bottom half. Each leaflet also bears scales and a prominent midrib, with tomentose margins, and lacking visible veinlets.

The inflorescence emerges below the crownshaft, stiff and horizontal, and branched to three orders. Covered in scales, the peduncle is short and thick, the prophyll is tubular, beaked and tomentose, and the long rachis bears numerous short rachillae which are often Z-shaped. The rachillae bear short round bracts subtending triads of large flowers throughout.

The staminate flowers are more or less asymmetrical and bear three distinct, hairy sepals, and three ovate, scaly petals. There may be as many as 100 stamens, with short filaments, and elongated, apically notched, deeply bifid anthers. The exine is finely reticulate and tectate. The pistilode is bottle-shaped and has pointed tips. The pistillate flowers are smaller, ovoid, and occasionally hairy; both sepals and petals are imbricate, the latter bearing scales. There are three united staminodes forming a small cup, the gynoecium is ovoid and uniovulate; the pendulous stigma has three lobes. The fruit is egg-shaped with a wrinkly exterior, divided into lobed segments when dry, and mature at orange or red. The epicarp is fibrous, the mesocarp fleshy, covering a five-lobed seed, resembling the dry fruit.

== Distribution and habitat ==
In New Guinea and the Solomon Islands, they are found in a variety of settings and at various elevations. Growing in rocky or mountainous rain forest, in rain forest low lands, and alongside rivers, they are not particular to soil type. P. lepidotus grows high, to 3000 m, not preferring truly tropical conditions.

== Cultivation and uses ==
Only P. paradoxus is cultivated with any regularity, though it is relatively uncommon. They are tender to cold, need quickly draining soil and generous amounts of water. In the New Guinea highlands, the trunks of P. lepidotus are used in construction or cut into 2 m strips and carved into bows; smaller pieces are fashioned into arrows and arrow heads.
