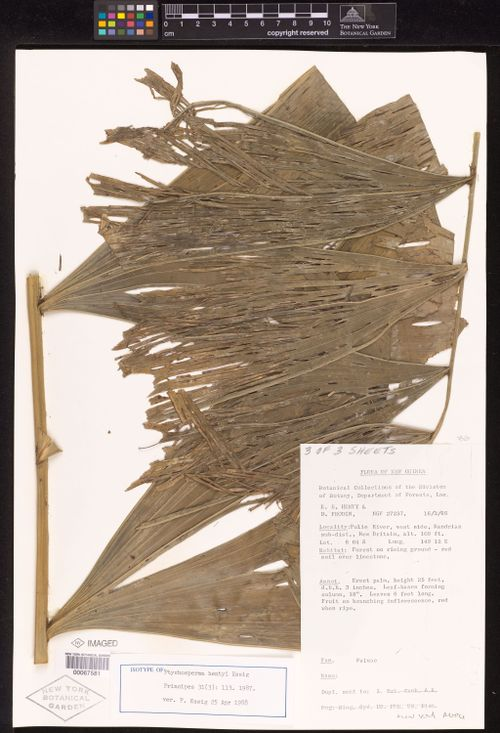

Conservation status
- Endangered (IUCN 3.1)

Scientific classification
- Kingdom: Plantae
- Clade: Tracheophytes
- Clade: Angiosperms
- Clade: Monocots
- Clade: Commelinids
- Order: Arecales
- Family: Arecaceae
- Genus: Ponapea
- Species: P. hentyi

Binomial name
- Ponapea hentyi (Essig) C.Lewis & Zona

Synonyms
- Drymophloeus hentyi (Essig) Zona; Ptychosperma hentyi Essig

= Ponapea hentyi =

Species of palm

Ponapea hentyi is a species of palm tree. It is endemic to New Britain in the Bismarck Archipelago of Papua New Guinea. It is threatened by habitat loss.

The species was first described as Ptychosperma hentyi by Frederick Burt Essig in 1987. The Latin specific epithet of hentyi refers to plant collector and botanist E.E. Henty, (fl. 1969). In 2011 Carl E. Lewis and Scott Zona placed the species in genus Ponapea as P. hentyi.
