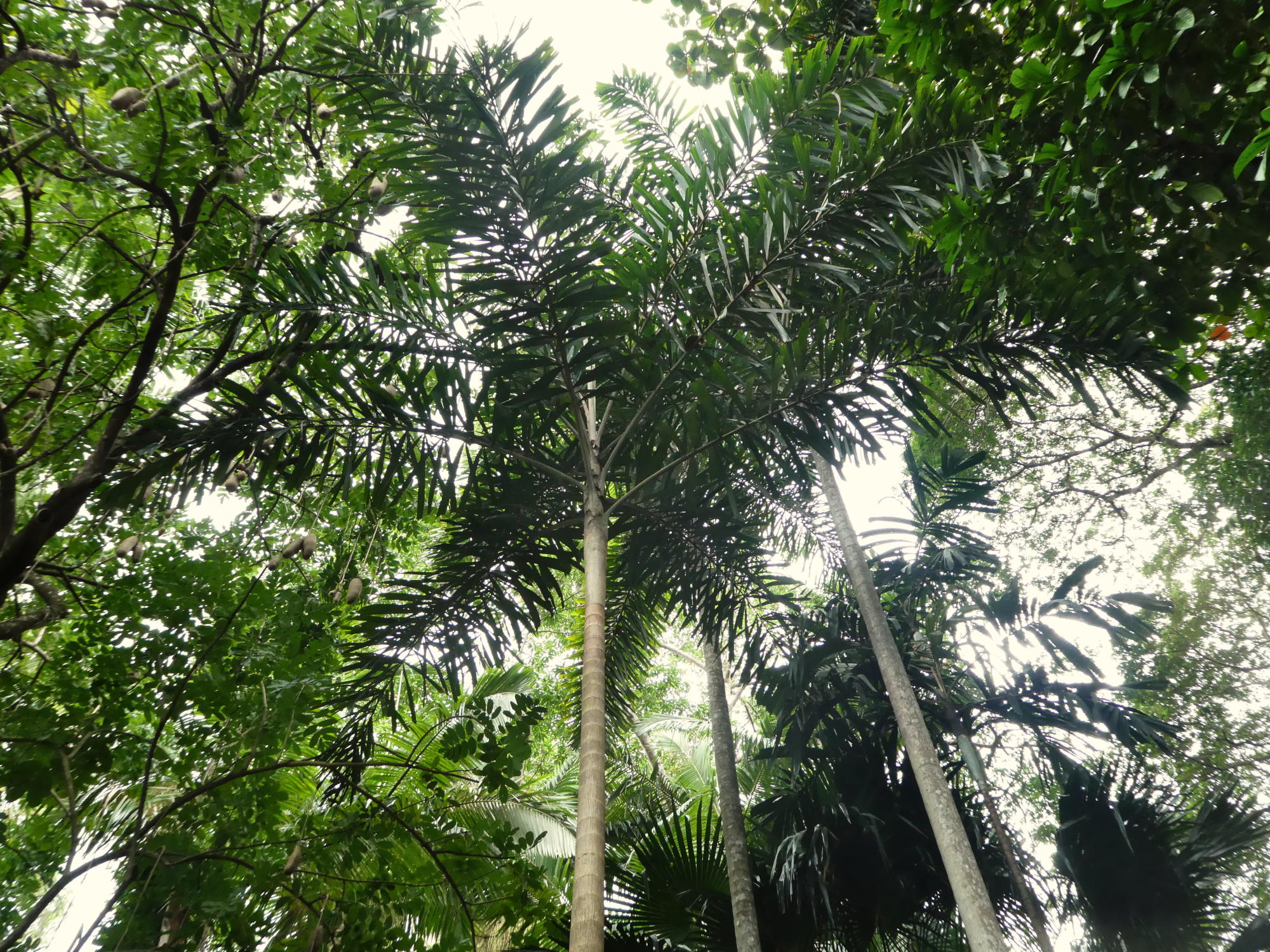
- Normanbya normanbyi (three slim trunks in centre)

Conservation status
- Vulnerable (IUCN 2.3)
- Least Concern (NCA)

Scientific classification
- Kingdom: Plantae
- Clade: Tracheophytes
- Clade: Angiosperms
- Clade: Monocots
- Clade: Commelinids
- Order: Arecales
- Family: Arecaceae
- Subfamily: Arecoideae
- Tribe: Areceae
- Subtribe: Ptychospermatinae
- Genus: Normanbya; F.Muell. ex Becc.
- Species: N. normanbyi

Binomial name
- Normanbya normanbyi (A.W.Hill) L.H.Bailey

= Normanbya =

Genus of palm endemic to Australia

Normanbya is a genus of palm trees containing the sole species Normanbya normanbyi, known by the common name black palm. It is endemic to Queensland, Australia and is threatened by habitat destruction.

== Description ==
Normanbya normanbyi is visually very similar to the more well-known Foxtail palm but is slightly smaller in all respects. It is a single-stemmed palm with attractive "bushy" fronds, similar to a bottlebrush. It grows to a height of 30 m (98 ft) with a small crown of fronds each measuring around 2.5 m (8 ft 2 in) long with a petiole, or leaf stem, about 30 cm (12 in) long. The fronds have 75–95 whorled pinnae (leaflets) up to 45 cm (18 in) in length, each of which are divided longitudinally into 7–11 radiating segments, giving the fronds the bushy appearance. The pinnae are dark green on the upper surface and silvery underneath and the tips are abruptly truncated (like a fishtail).

The inflorescence (grouping of flowers) is a panicle and is borne on the trunk just below the crownshaft. They are around 90 cm (35 in) long and the sessile (stemless) green flowers are grouped in threes, each with one pistillate (functionally female) and two staminate (functionally male) flowers. The staminate flowers have 24 to 40 stamens, the pistillate flowers have three strongly recurved stigmas.

Ripe fruit measure 35 to 50 mm (1.4 to 2.0 in) long and 25 to 40 mm (0.98 to 1.57 in) wide, and are pink to reddish-brown in colour. They contain a single seed about 35 by 25 mm (1.38 by 0.98 in).

== Taxonomy ==
The basionym of this species is Cocos normanby, described in 1874 by Walter Hill from a specimen he found on the banks of the Daintree River, and named by him in honour of the then Governor of Queensland George Phipps, 2nd Marquess of Normanby. In 1930 the American botanist Liberty Hyde Bailey reclassified it under its current name.

== Distribution and habitat ==
This species is restricted to a small part of the Wet Tropics of Queensland World Heritage Site, specifically the area from just south of Rossville to just south of the Daintree River near Mossman. It grows in tropical rainforest in altitudes from sea level up to 700 m (2,300 ft). There is also a single confirmed sighting of the black palm from Moa Island in the Torres Strait, which is roughly 695 km (432 mi) north of Rossville.

== Ecology and uses ==
Fruits of the Black palm are eaten by cassowaries and sulphur-crested cockatoos. Whilst the cassowary swallows the fruit whole and passes the seed out in its droppings, thereby assisting in spreading the seeds throughout the forest, the cockatoos will remove the fruit's flesh and chew into the seeds themselves, destroying their ability to germinate.

The Kuku Yalanji people, who are the original inhabitants of the area where this palm is found, had many uses for the plant. The very hard timber was split along the length of the trunk to make spears, clapsticks, nulla nullas and digging sticks. The buds and new shoots can be eaten and a fibre made from the crownshafts was used as a string to tie spear heads to the shafts, fish traps and cradles.

== Conservation status ==
In the IUCN's Red List, this species is assessed as vulnerable, but in the Australian state of Queensland (where the plant is endemic) it is considered to be of least concern.

The IUCN cites "land clearance" as the justification for the vulnerable status of Normanbya normanbyi. While much of the area where it grows is protected under both Queensland's National Park system and the World Heritage listing, there is also a significant portion of lowland rainforest that is privately owned, uncleared land, and which has an uncertain future in regard to the preservation of the natural habitat.

== Cultivation ==
Normanbya normanbyi is visually very similar to the very popular foxtail palm (Wodyetia bifurcata) but is not as widely planted as the latter. It may be grown from fresh seed and is also available at many plant nurseries. It requires a shady position when young, well-drained soil and plentiful water.

== Gallery ==
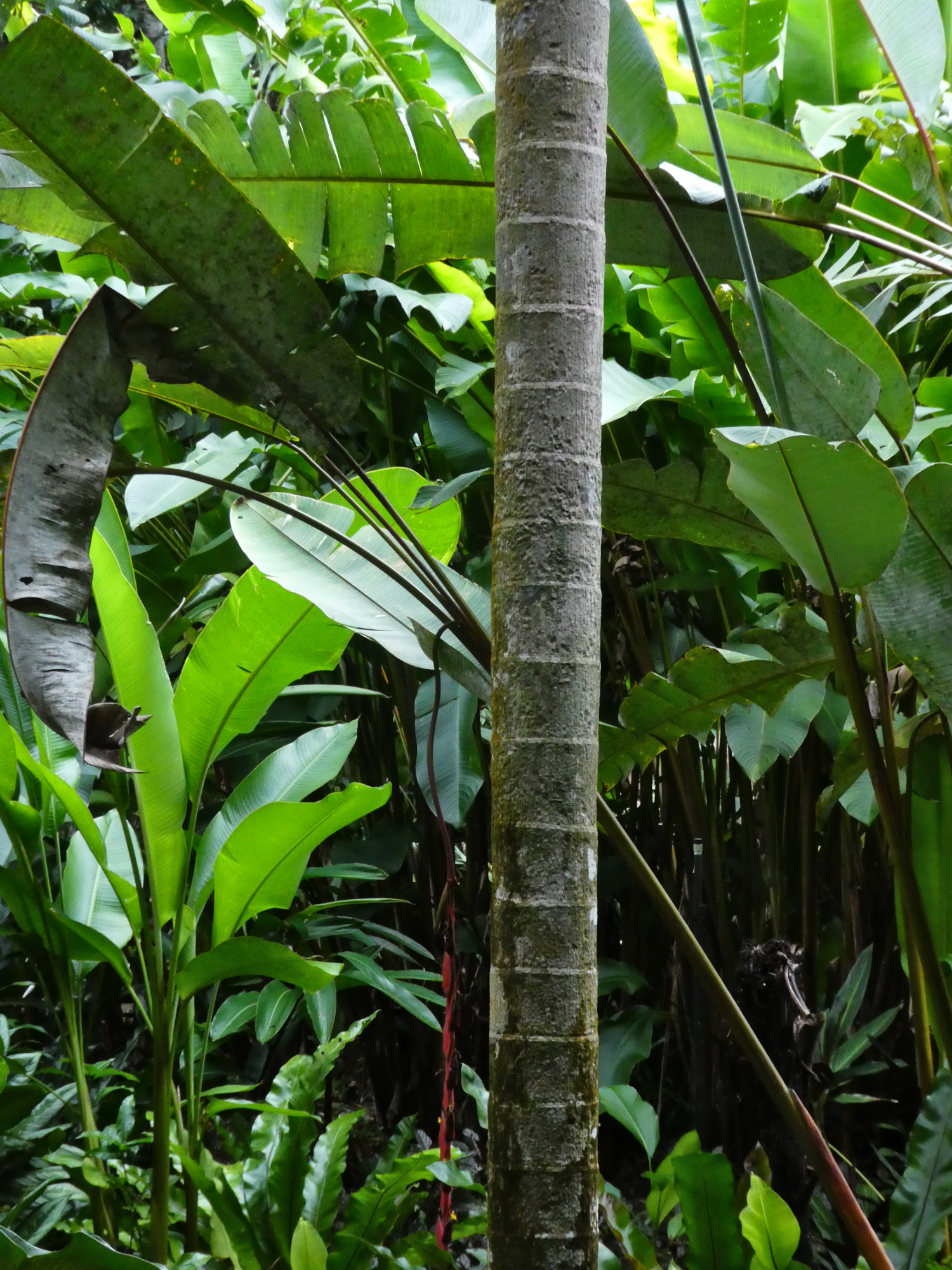
Trunk, growing amongst lush tropical foliage in the Cairns Botanic Gardens, Queensland, Australia

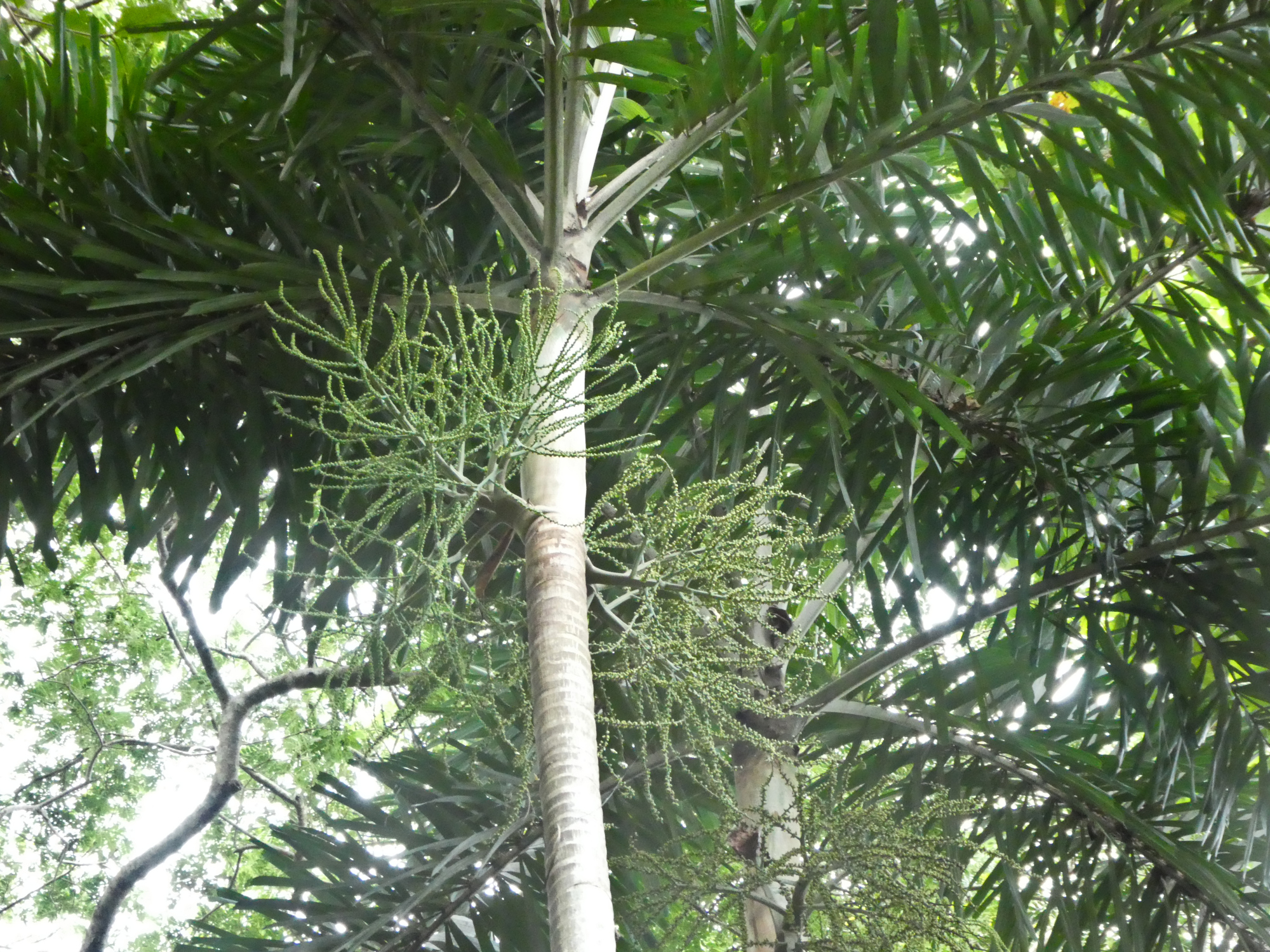
Crown and inflorescences, Cairns Botanic Gardens, Queensland, Australia

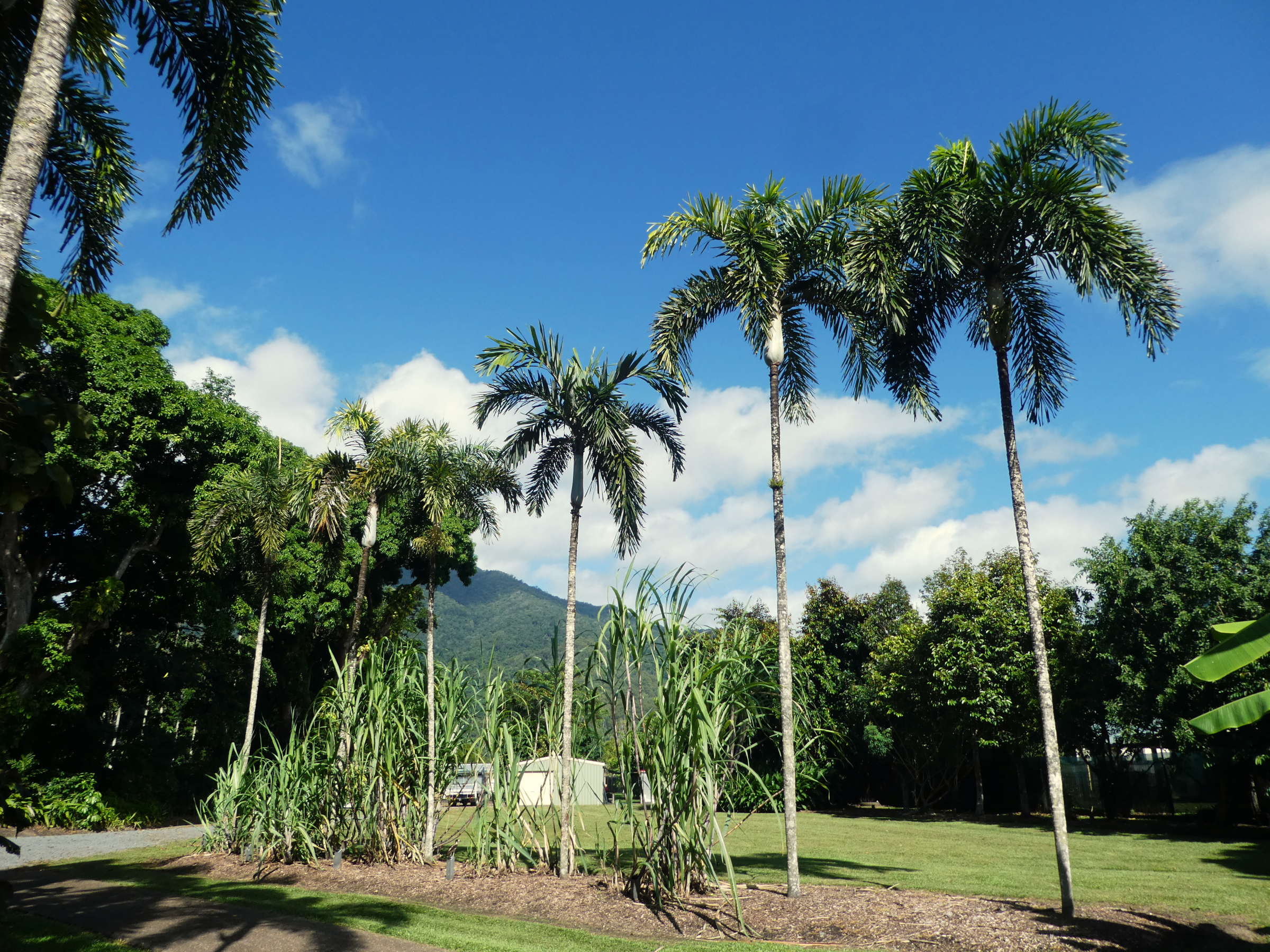
A row of black palms planted in Cairns

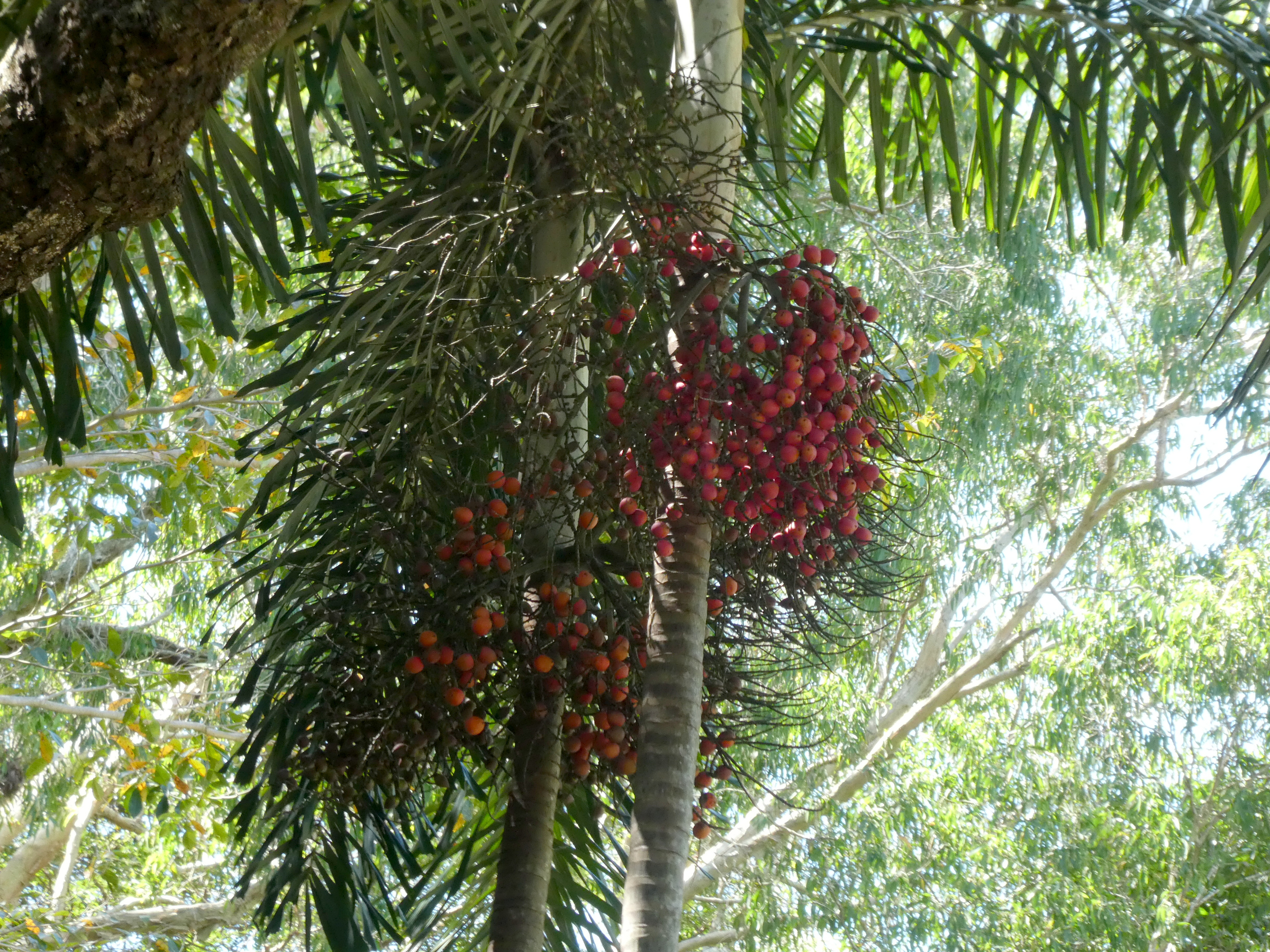
Fruiting in Cairns Botanic Gardens, September 2022

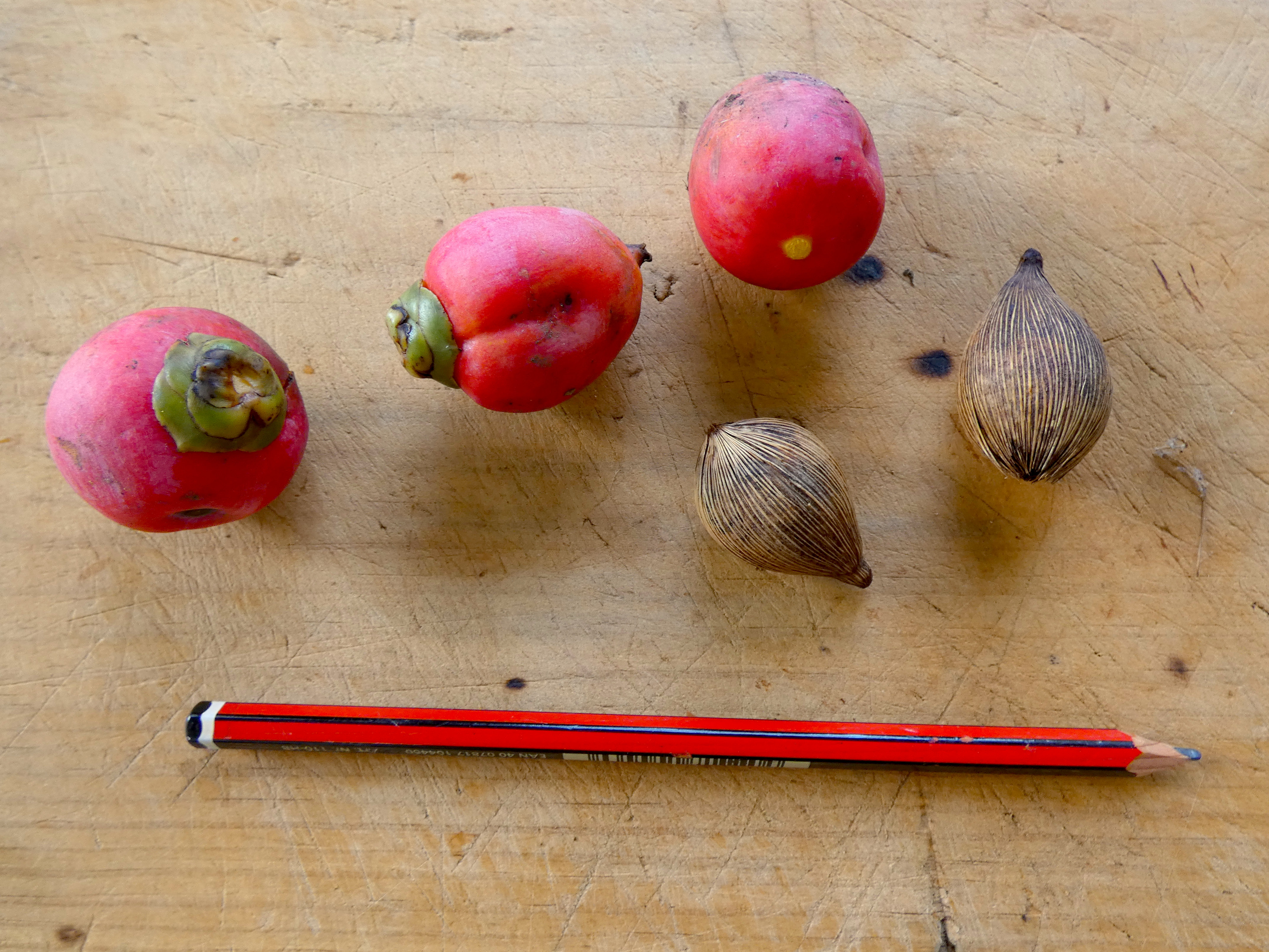
Fruit and seeds
