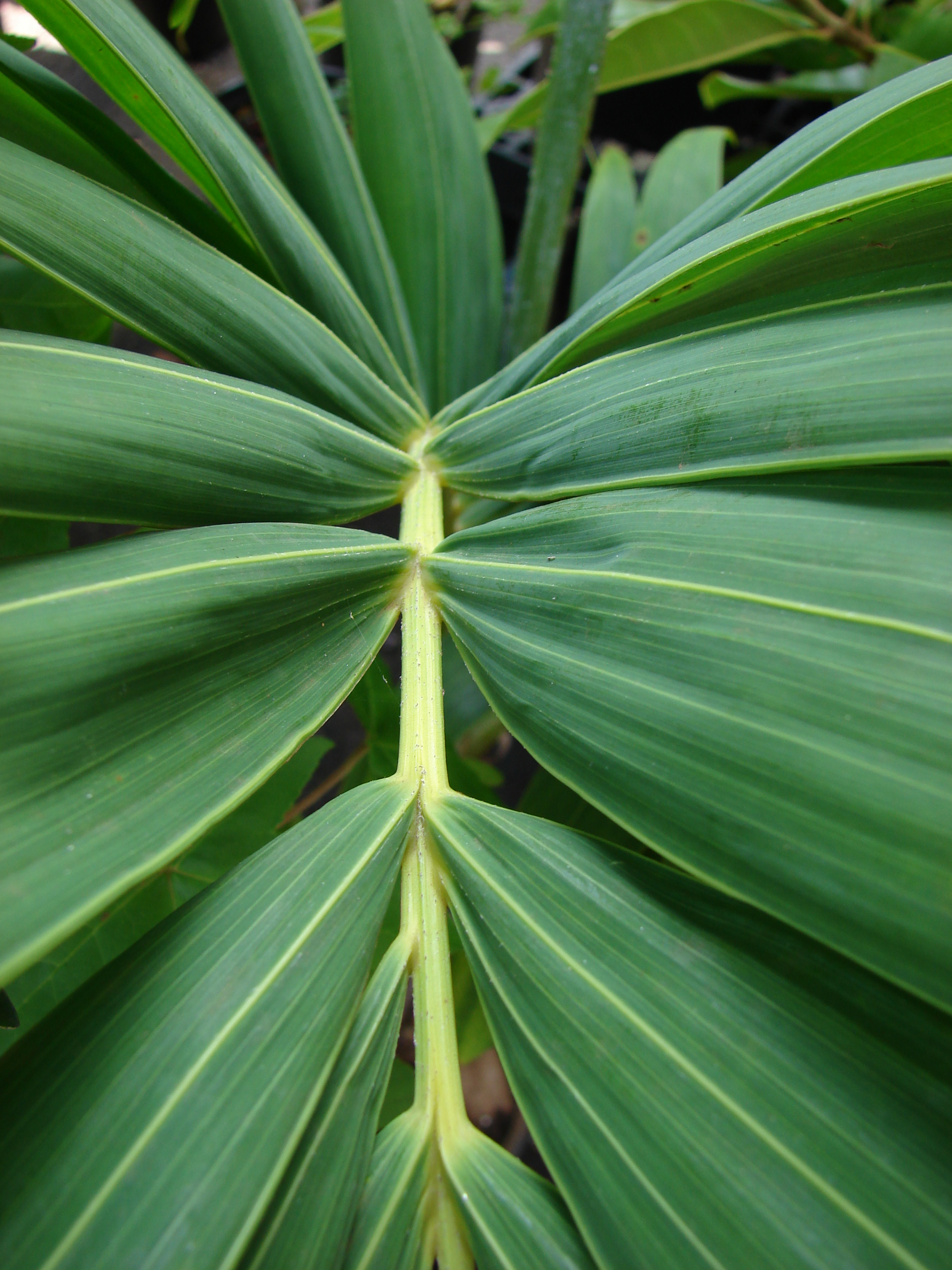
- Adonidia merrillii

Scientific classification
- Kingdom: Plantae
- Clade: Tracheophytes
- Clade: Angiosperms
- Clade: Monocots
- Clade: Commelinids
- Order: Arecales
- Family: Arecaceae
- Subfamily: Arecoideae
- Tribe: Areceae
- Subtribe: Ptychospermatinae; Benth. & Hook.f.

Genera
- Adonidia - Balaka - Brassiophoenix - Carpentaria - Drymophloeus - Manjekia - Normanbya - Ponapea - Ptychococcus - Ptychosperma - Veitchia - Wodyetia

= Ptychospermatinae =

Subtribe of palms

Ptychospermatinae is a palm tree subtribe in the tribe Areceae.

Genera:

- Adonidia
- Balaka
- Brassiophoenix
- Carpentaria
- Drymophloeus
- Jailoloa
- Manjekia
- Normanbya
- Ponapea
- Ptychococcus
- Ptychosperma
- Veitchia
- Wallaceodoxa
- Wodyetia
