= Ponapea =

Scientific classification
- Kingdom: Plantae
- Clade: Tracheophytes
- Clade: Angiosperms
- Clade: Monocots
- Clade: Commelinids
- Order: Arecales
- Family: Arecaceae
- Subfamily: Arecoideae
- Tribe: Areceae
- Subtribe: Ptychospermatinae
- Genus: Ponapea; Becc.

Type species
- Ponapea ledermanniana Becc.

Genus of palms

Ponapea is a genus of palms which is native to certain islands in the western Pacific. The genus consists of four species, and has often been considered to be part of the genus Ptychosperma. Three of the species are endemic to the Caroline Islands, the fourth to the Bismarck Archipelago.

- Ponapea hentyi (Essig) C.Lewis & Zona - New Britain
- Ponapea hosinoi Kaneh. - Pohnpei
- Ponapea ledermanniana Becc. - Caroline Islands
- Ponapea palauensis Kaneh. - Palau
