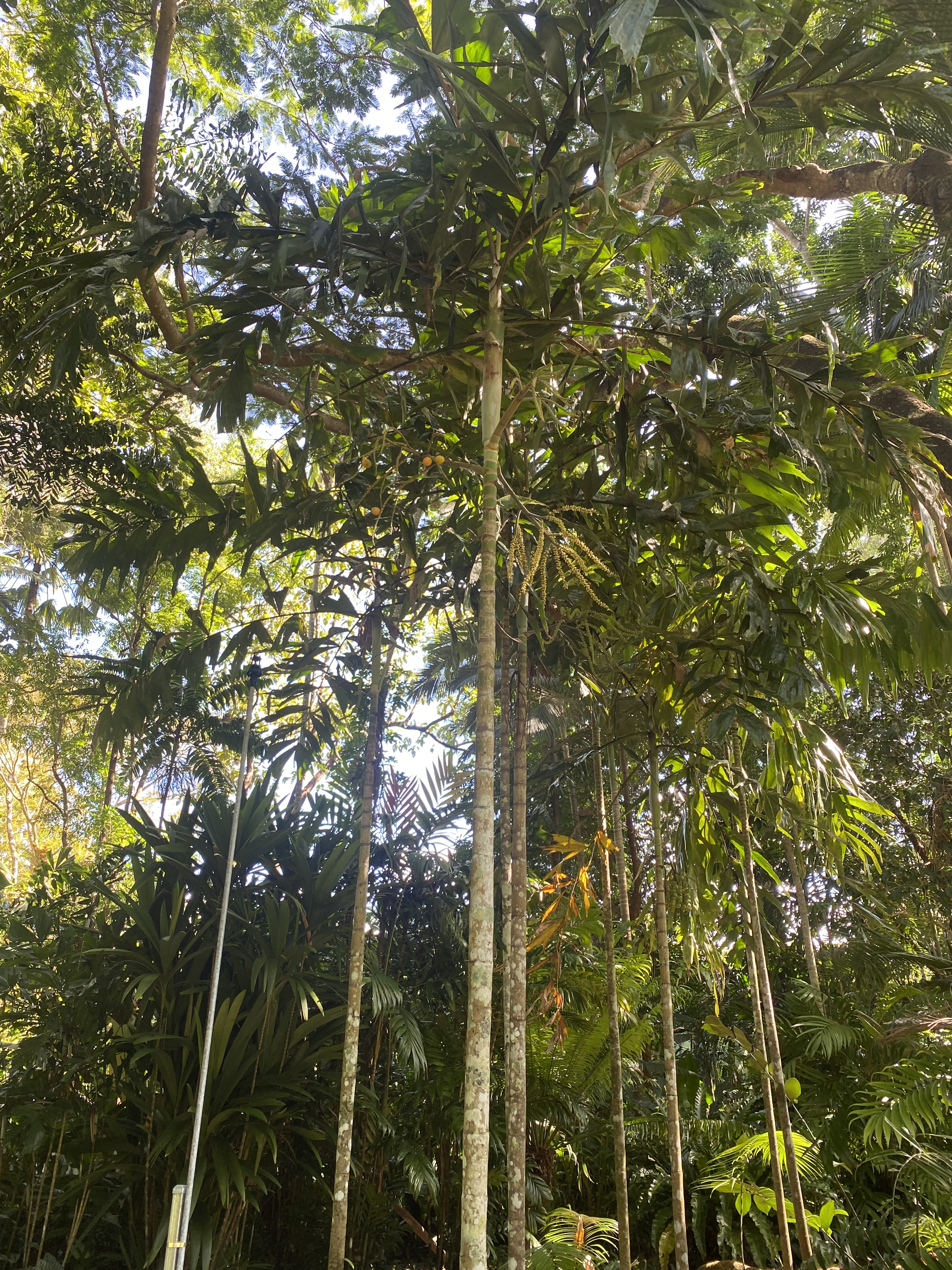
- Brassiophoenix schumannii

Scientific classification
- Kingdom: Plantae
- Clade: Tracheophytes
- Clade: Angiosperms
- Clade: Monocots
- Clade: Commelinids
- Order: Arecales
- Family: Arecaceae
- Subfamily: Arecoideae
- Tribe: Areceae
- Subtribe: Ptychospermatinae
- Genus: Brassiophoenix; Burret

Species
- Brassiophoenix drymophoeoides Burret; Brassiophoenix schumannii (Becc.) Essig

= Brassiophoenix =

Genus of palms

Brassiophoenix is a genus of monoecious flowering plants in the palm family found in Papua New Guinea. Of the two similar species, one is more common in cultivation and was mistakenly identified as Brassiophoenix schumannii. In 1999, Zona and Estig showed that the commonly cultivated species was instead the type species Brassiophoenix drymophoeoides. The two species are distinguished by their separated geographical locations and minor differences in fruit form. The genus name is a combination of the surname Brass, honoring the first collector L.J. Brass, and Phoenix, another palm genus.

== Description ==
Both species grow to around 9 m (30 ft) in height on 8 cm (3.1 in) trunks culminating in 60 cm (24 in) tall, slightly bulging crownshafts and sparse leaf crowns. The stiff, unarching leaves are pinnate to 2 m (6.6 ft) in length, petioles short or absent, the pinnae being regularly spaced and diamond-shaped, 30 cm (12 in) long and dark green in color. The leaflets are thrice lobed, the center lobe being deepest, forming unusual jagged apices. The inflorescences emerge from beneath the crownshaft, twice branched, with furry ropes of male and female flowers. Brassiophoenix fruit matures to yellow, orange, or red in color, each with one seed.

== Distribution and habitat ==
These palms grow in the mixed lowland rain forest of Papua New Guinea.

== Cultivation ==
While Brassiophoenix palms are not widespread, they have been in cultivation for many years. As with many rain forest palms, they are not tolerant of full sun in youth but will withstand it in maturity. They also require generous amounts of water and a fast-draining, rich soil. Given their tropical origins they also require protection from cold when cultivated.
