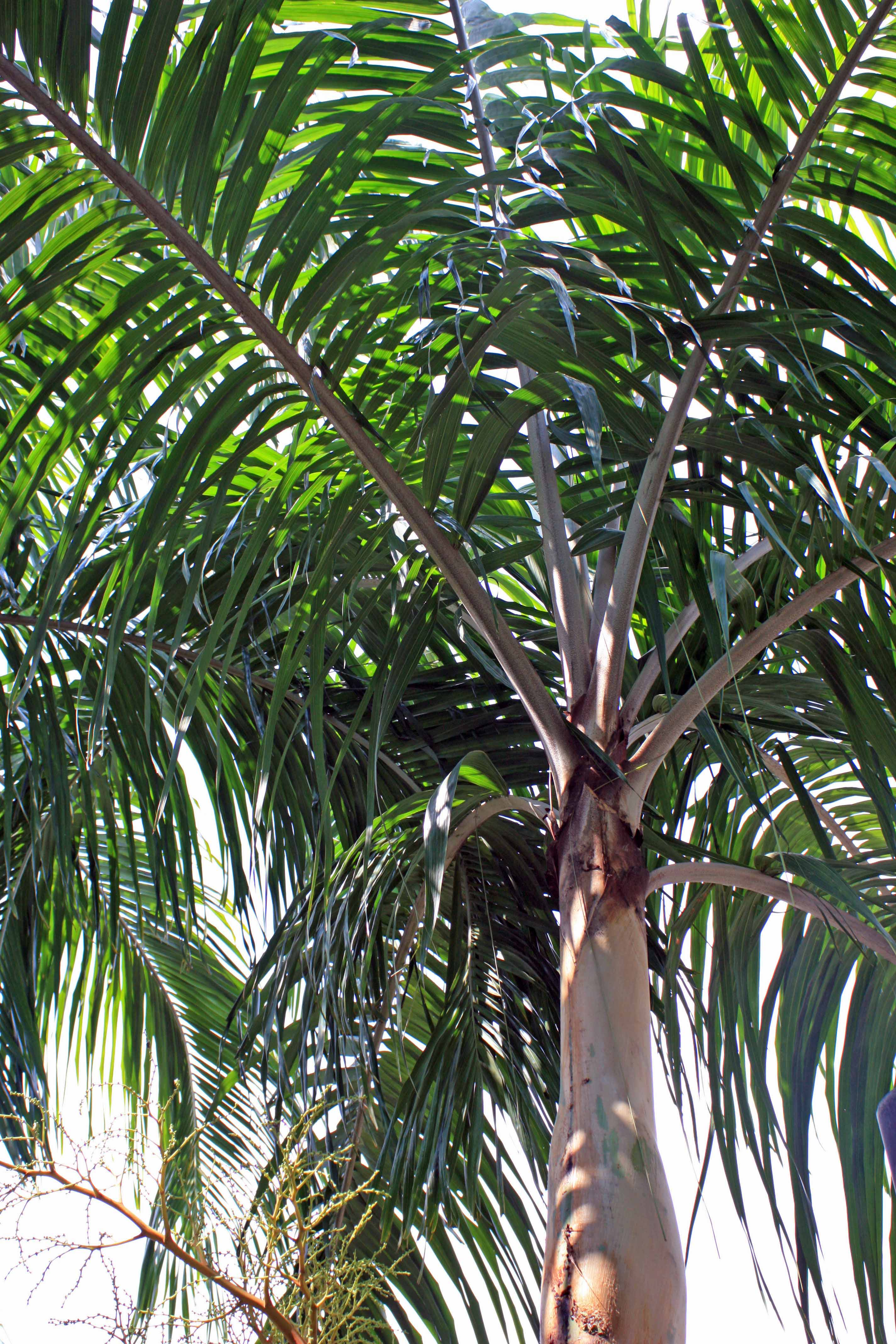

Scientific classification
- Kingdom: Plantae
- Clade: Tracheophytes
- Clade: Angiosperms
- Clade: Monocots
- Clade: Commelinids
- Order: Arecales
- Family: Arecaceae
- Subfamily: Arecoideae
- Tribe: Areceae
- Subtribe: Ptychospermatinae
- Genus: Carpentaria; Becc.
- Species: C. acuminata

Binomial name
- Carpentaria acuminata (H.Wendl. & Drude) Becc.

= Carpentaria =

Genus of palms

Carpentaria acuminata (carpentaria palm), the sole species in the genus Carpentaria, is a palm native to tropical coastal regions in the north of Northern Territory, Australia.

It is a slender palm, growing to 20 m (65 ft) tall in the garden situation, with a trunk 12–15 cm (5–6 in) diameter. The leaves are pinnate, 3–4 m (10–15 ft) long. However, in its natural rainforest location such as at Fogg Dam Monsoon Forest 70 km (45 mi) east of Darwin, specimens often exceed 30 metres (100 ft) in height. It is a popular ornamental plant in northern Australia, valued for its rapid growth and very elegant foliage. In recent years, particularly in the capital of the Northern Territory, Darwin, the maturation of gardens after their destruction during Cyclone Tracy in 1974, has resulted in many thousands of specimens of these local palms reaching maturity and fruiting. This has led to many carpentaria palms being removed because of the high volumes of fruits they produce. The ripening fruits attract fruit bats and Torres Strait pigeons which can create a mess in smaller suburban gardens. It is however, a beautiful and very fast growing specimen tree in the right location.

Note that Carpentaria should not be confused with the similarly spelled Carpenteria, a genus of shrubs in the family Hydrangeaceae native to California.

== Gallery ==
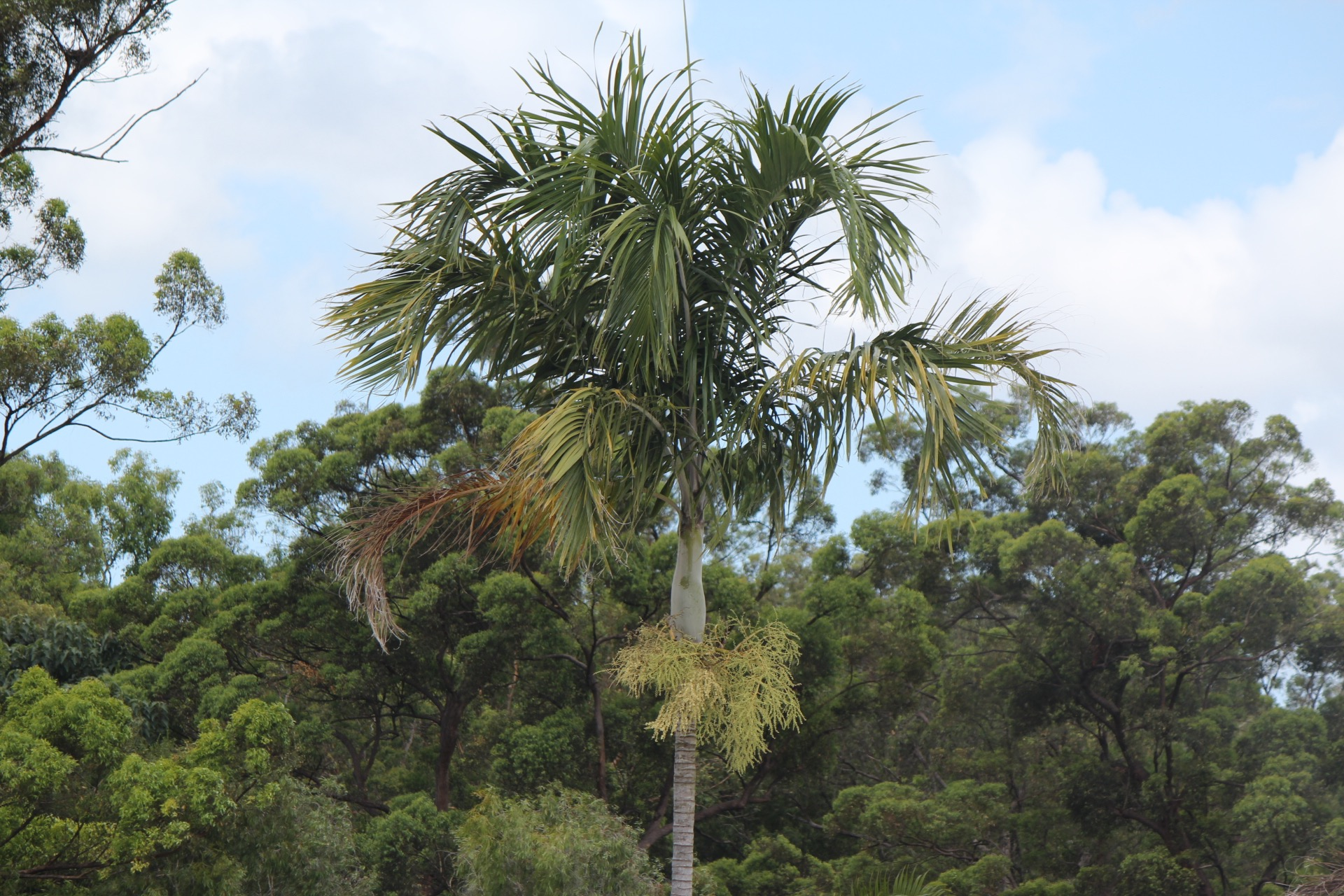
Carpentaria acuminata at Mount Coot-Tha, Brisbane

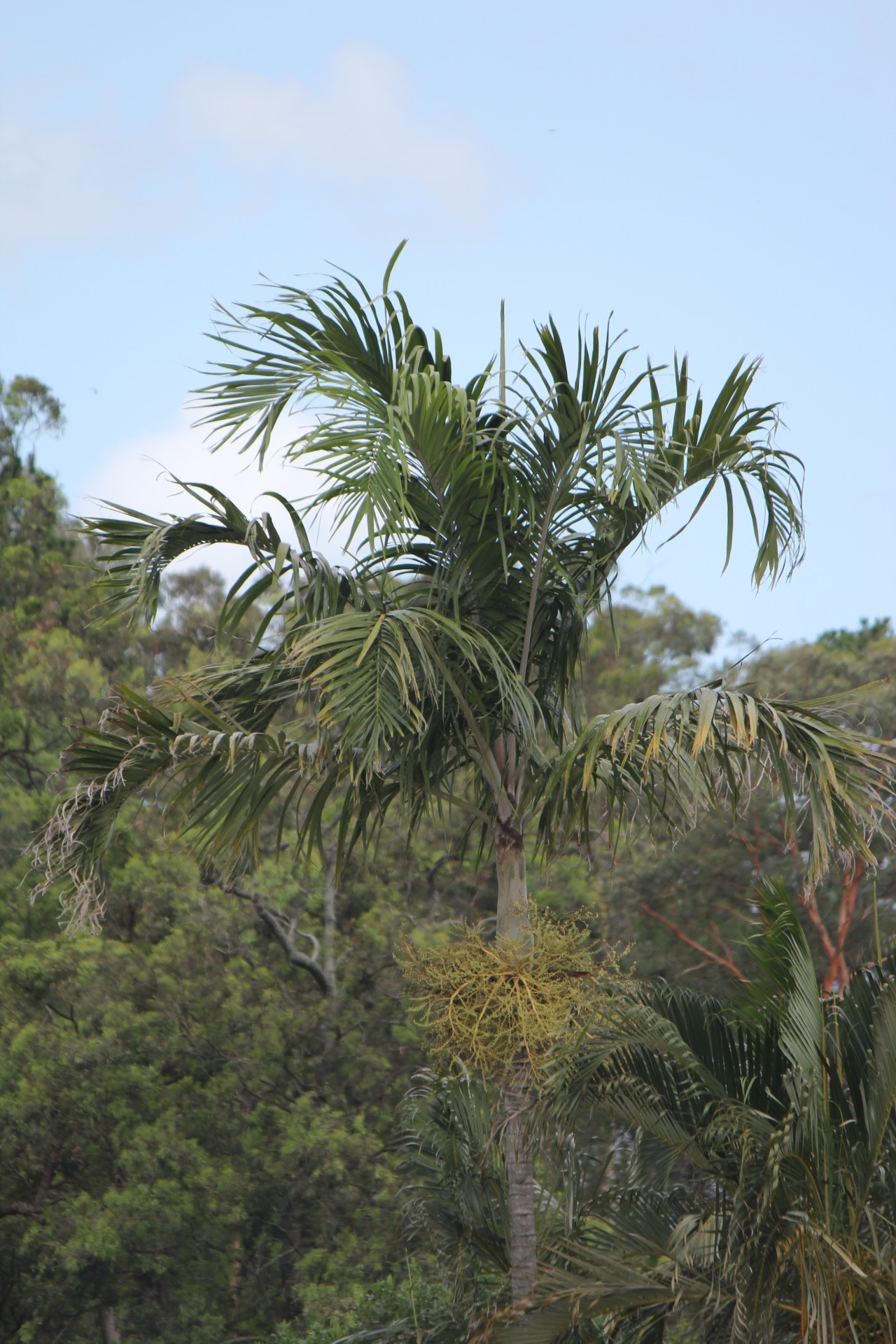
Carpentaria acuminata at Mount Coot-Tha, Brisbane

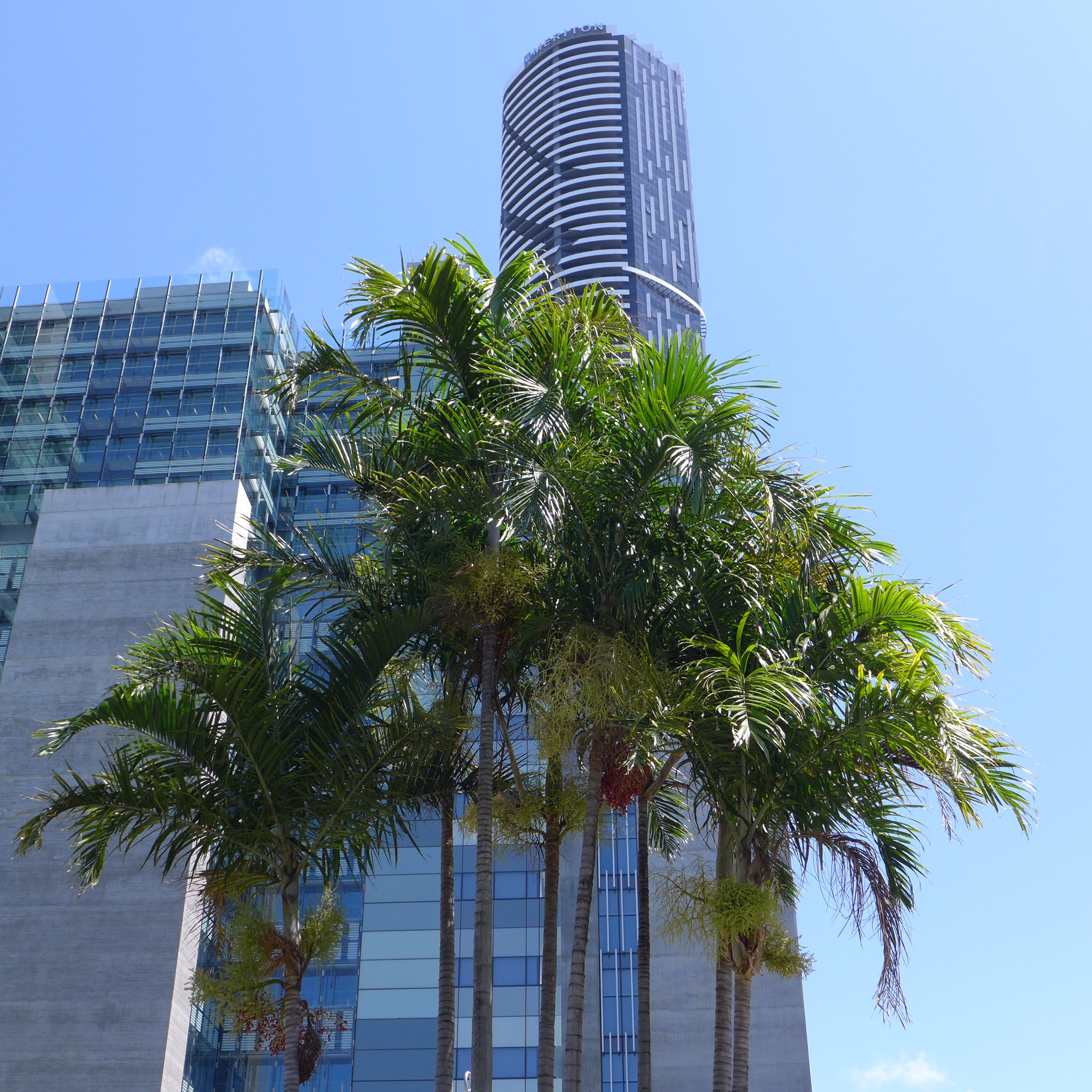
Carpentaria acuminata at QEII Law Courts Brisbane

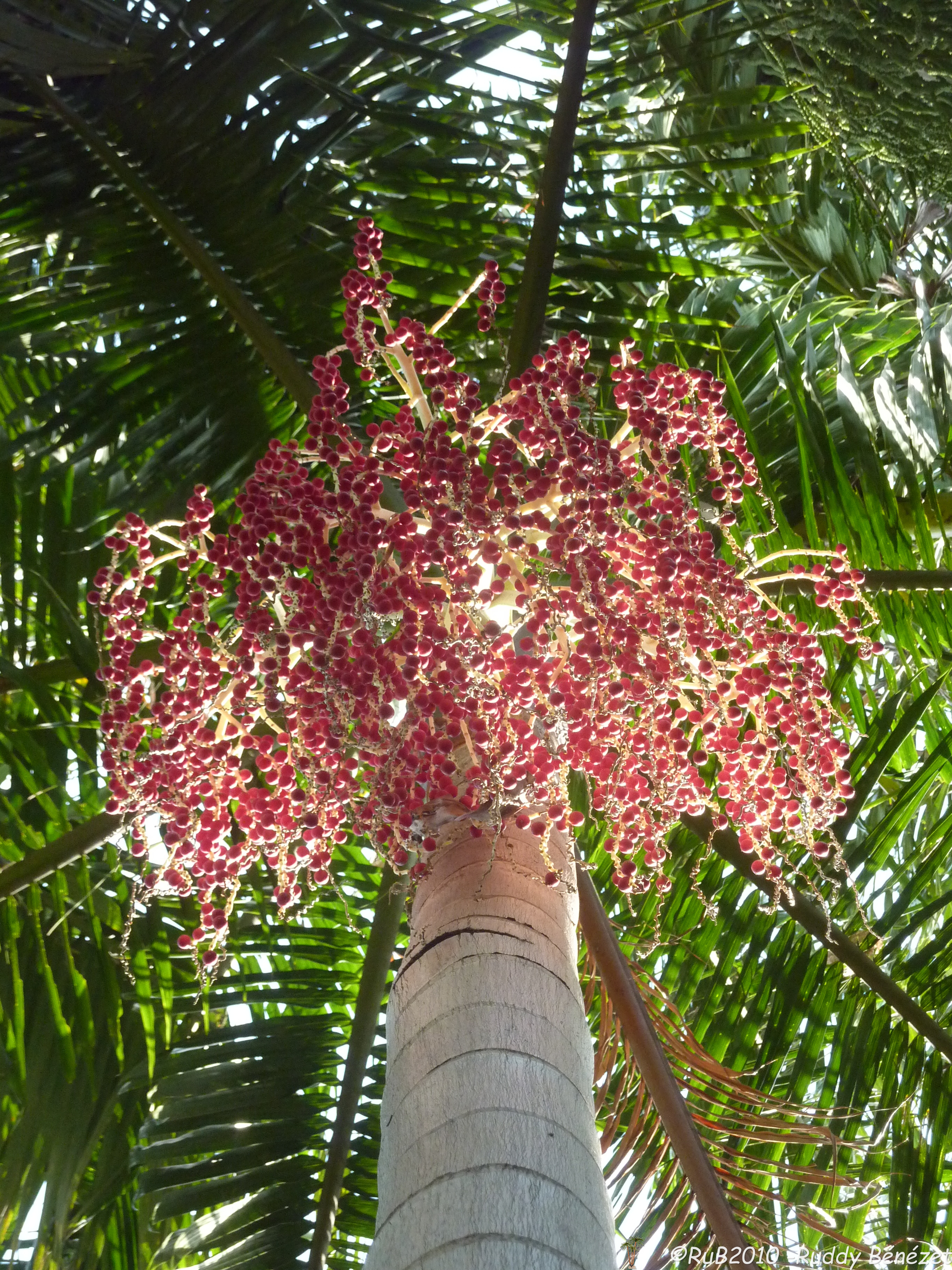
Infrutescence of Carpentaria acuminata on the Reunion Island
