= List of Sustainable Development Goal targets and indicators =

Brief of the 17 SDGs

This List of SDG targets and indicators provides a complete overview of all the targets and indicators for the 17 Sustainable Development Goals.

The global indicator framework for Sustainable Development Goals was developed by the Inter-Agency and Expert Group on SDG Indicators (IAEG-SDGs) and agreed upon at the 48th session of the United Nations Statistical Commission held in March 2017. The official indicator list below includes all the refinements made as of March 2020.

== Background ==
The lists of 169 targets and indicators for the 17 SDGs was published in a UN resolution in July 2017. Each goal typically has eight to 12 targets, and each target has between one and four indicators used to measure progress toward reaching the targets, with the average of 1.5 indicators per target. The targets are either outcome targets (circumstances to be attained) or means of implementation targets. The latter targets were introduced late in the process of negotiating the SDGs to address the concern of some Member States about how the SDGs were to be achieved. Goal 17 is wholly about how the SDGs will be achieved.

The numbering system of targets is as follows: Outcome targets use numbers, whereas means of implementation targets use lower case letters. For example, SDG 6 has a total of 8 targets. The first six are outcome targets and are labeled Targets 6.1 to 6.6. The final two targets are means of implementation targets and are labeled as Targets 6.a and 6.b.

However, the connection between means of implementation with outcomes is not well proven. The means of implementation targets (those denoted with a letter, for example, Target 6.a) are not well conceptualized and not formulated in a consistent manner. Also, measuring and tracking their indicators is difficult.

== Targets and indicators for each SDG ==
This table is the global indicator framework for the Sustainable Development Goals and targets of the 2030 Agenda for Sustainable Development (Note: As contained in the Annex of the resolution adopted by the General Assembly on 6 July 2017, Work of the Statistical Commission pertaining to the 2030 Agenda for Sustainable Development (A/RES/71/313), annual refinements contained in E/CN.3/2018/2 (Annex II), E/CN.3/2019/2 (Annex II), and 2020 Comprehensive Review changes (Annex II) and annual refinements (Annex III) contained in E/CN.3/2020/2.) The footnotes are updates from the indicator framework in 2020. Earlier in 2016, as stated in the UN Sustainability Development, the Member States have decided that the report should be produced once every four years to inform the SDG review deliberations; reported from 15 experts who all have representing backgrounds. The official indicator list below includes all updates until the 51st session Statistical Commission in March 2020. Between 15 October 2018 and 17 April 2020, a range of changes have been made to the indicators. Those are not yet reflected in the table below.

Sustainable Development Goal indicators should be disaggregated, where relevant, by income, sex, age, race, ethnicity, migratory status, disability and geographic location, or other characteristics, in accordance with the Fundamental Principles of Official Statistics. (Note: Resolution 68/261)

=== Goal 1: End poverty in all its forms everywhere ===

Targets (from the 2030 Agenda for Sustainable Development)	Indicators (versions from March 2020)	UNSD Indicator Codes (Note: Indicator codes were developed by UNSD for data transfer, tracking and other statistical purposes.)
1.1 By 2030, eradicate extreme poverty for all people everywhere, currently measured as people living on less than $2.15 a day	1.1.1 Proportion of the population living below the international poverty line by sex, age, employment status and geographic location (urban/rural)	C010101
1.2 By 2030, reduce at least by half the proportion of men, women and children of all ages living in poverty in all its dimensions according to national definitions	1.2.1 Proportion of population living below the national poverty line, by sex and age	C010201
1.2 By 2030, reduce at least by half the proportion of men, women and children of all ages living in poverty in all its dimensions according to national definitions	1.2.2 Proportion of men, women and children of all ages living in poverty in all its dimensions according to national definitions	C010202
1.3 Implement nationally appropriate social protection systems and measures for all, including floors, and by 2030 achieve substantial coverage of the poor and the vulnerable	1.3.1 Proportion of population covered by social protection floors/systems, by sex, distinguishing children, unemployed persons, older persons, persons with disabilities, pregnant women, newborns, work-injury victims and the poor and the vulnerable	C010301
1.4 By 2030, ensure that all men and women, in particular the poor and the vulnerable, have equal rights to economic resources, as well as access to basic services, ownership and control over land and other forms of property, inheritance, natural resources, appropriate new technology and financial services, including microfinance	1.4.1 Proportion of population living in households with access to basic services	C010401
1.4 By 2030, ensure that all men and women, in particular the poor and the vulnerable, have equal rights to economic resources, as well as access to basic services, ownership and control over land and other forms of property, inheritance, natural resources, appropriate new technology and financial services, including microfinance	1.4.2 Proportion of total adult population with secure tenure rights to land, (a) with legally recognized documentation, and (b) who perceive their rights to land as secure, by sex and type of tenure	C010402
1.5 By 2030, build the resilience of the poor and those in vulnerable situations and reduce their exposure and vulnerability to climate-related extreme events and other economic, social and environmental shocks and disasters	1.5.1 Number of deaths, missing persons and directly affected persons attributed to disasters per 100,000 population	C200303
1.5 By 2030, build the resilience of the poor and those in vulnerable situations and reduce their exposure and vulnerability to climate-related extreme events and other economic, social and environmental shocks and disasters	1.5.2 Direct economic loss attributed to disasters in relation to global gross domestic product (GDP)	C010502
1.5 By 2030, build the resilience of the poor and those in vulnerable situations and reduce their exposure and vulnerability to climate-related extreme events and other economic, social and environmental shocks and disasters	1.5.3 Number of countries that adopt and implement national disaster risk reduction strategies in line with the Sendai Framework for Disaster Risk Reduction 2015–2030	C200304
1.5 By 2030, build the resilience of the poor and those in vulnerable situations and reduce their exposure and vulnerability to climate-related extreme events and other economic, social and environmental shocks and disasters	1.5.4 Proportion of local governments that adopt and implement local disaster risk reduction strategies in line with national disaster risk reduction strategies	C200305
1.a Ensure significant mobilization of resources from a variety of sources, including through enhanced development cooperation, in order to provide adequate and predictable means for developing countries, in particular least developed countries, to implement programmes and policies to end poverty in all its dimensions	1.a.1 Total official development assistance grants from all donors that focus on poverty reduction as a share of the recipient country's gross national income	C010a04
1.a Ensure significant mobilization of resources from a variety of sources, including through enhanced development cooperation, in order to provide adequate and predictable means for developing countries, in particular least developed countries, to implement programmes and policies to end poverty in all its dimensions	1.a.2 Proportion of total government spending on essential services (education, health and social protection)	C010a02
1.b Create sound policy frameworks at the national, regional and international levels, based on pro-poor and gender-sensitive development strategies, to support accelerated investment in poverty eradication actions	1.b.1 Pro-poor public social spending	C010b02

=== Goal 2: End hunger, achieve food security and improved nutrition and promote sustainable agriculture ===

Targets (from the 2030 Agenda for Sustainable Development)	Indicators (versions from March 2020)	UNSD Indicator Codes (Note: Indicator codes were developed by UNSD for data transfer, tracking and other statistical purposes.)
2.1 By 2030, end hunger and ensure access by all people, in particular the poor and people in vulnerable situations, including infants, to safe, nutritious and sufficient food all year round	2.1.1 Prevalence of undernourishment	C020101
2.1 By 2030, end hunger and ensure access by all people, in particular the poor and people in vulnerable situations, including infants, to safe, nutritious and sufficient food all year round	2.1.2 Prevalence of moderate or severe food insecurity in the population, based on the Food Insecurity Experience Scale (FIES)	C020102
2.2 By 2030, end all forms of malnutrition, including achieving, by 2025, the internationally agreed targets on stunting and wasting in children under 5 years of age, and address the nutritional needs of adolescent girls, pregnant and lactating women and older persons	2.2.1 Prevalence of stunting (height for age <-2 standard deviation from the median of the World Health Organization (WHO) Child Growth Standards) among children under 5 years of age	C020201
2.2 By 2030, end all forms of malnutrition, including achieving, by 2025, the internationally agreed targets on stunting and wasting in children under 5 years of age, and address the nutritional needs of adolescent girls, pregnant and lactating women and older persons	2.2.2 Prevalence of malnutrition (weight for height >+2 or <-2 standard deviation from the median of the WHO Child Growth Standards) among children under 5 years of age, by type (wasting and overweight)	C020202
2.2 By 2030, end all forms of malnutrition, including achieving, by 2025, the internationally agreed targets on stunting and wasting in children under 5 years of age, and address the nutritional needs of adolescent girls, pregnant and lactating women and older persons	2.2.3 Prevalence of anaemia in women aged 15 to 49 years, by pregnancy status (percentage)	C020203
2.3 By 2030, double the agricultural productivity and incomes of small-scale food producers, in particular women, indigenous peoples, family farmers, pastoralists and fishers, including through secure and equal access to land, other productive resources and inputs, knowledge, financial services, markets and opportunities for value addition and non-farm employment	2.3.1 Volume of production per labour unit by classes of farming/pastoral/forestry enterprise size	C020301
2.3 By 2030, double the agricultural productivity and incomes of small-scale food producers, in particular women, indigenous peoples, family farmers, pastoralists and fishers, including through secure and equal access to land, other productive resources and inputs, knowledge, financial services, markets and opportunities for value addition and non-farm employment	2.3.2 Average income of small-scale food producers, by sex and indigenous status	C020302
2.4 By 2030, ensure sustainable food production systems and implement resilient agricultural practices that increase productivity and production, that help maintain ecosystems, that strengthen capacity for adaptation to climate change, extreme weather, drought, flooding and other disasters and that progressively improve land and soil quality	2.4.1 Proportion of agricultural area under productive and sustainable agriculture	C020401
2.5 By 2020, maintain the genetic diversity of seeds, cultivated plants and farmed and domesticated animals and their related wild species, including through soundly managed and diversified seed and plant banks at the national, regional and international levels, and promote access to and fair and equitable sharing of benefits arising from the utilization of genetic resources and associated traditional knowledge, as internationally agreed	2.5.1 Number of plant and animal genetic resources for food and agriculture secured in either medium- or long-term conservation facilities	C020501
2.5 By 2020, maintain the genetic diversity of seeds, cultivated plants and farmed and domesticated animals and their related wild species, including through soundly managed and diversified seed and plant banks at the national, regional and international levels, and promote access to and fair and equitable sharing of benefits arising from the utilization of genetic resources and associated traditional knowledge, as internationally agreed	2.5.2 Proportion of local breeds classified as being at risk of extinction	C020503
2.a Increase investment, including through enhanced international cooperation, in rural infrastructure, agricultural research and extension services, technology development and plant and livestock gene banks in order to enhance agricultural productive capacity in developing countries, in particular least developed countries	2.a.1 The agriculture orientation index for government expenditures	C020a01
2.a Increase investment, including through enhanced international cooperation, in rural infrastructure, agricultural research and extension services, technology development and plant and livestock gene banks in order to enhance agricultural productive capacity in developing countries, in particular least developed countries	2.a.2 Total official flows (official development assistance plus other official flows) to the agriculture sector	C020a02
2.b Correct and prevent trade restrictions and distortions in world agricultural markets, including through the parallel elimination of all forms of agricultural export subsidies and all export measures with equivalent effect, in accordance with the mandate of the Doha Development Round	2.b.1 Agricultural export subsidies	C020b02
2.c Adopt measures to ensure the proper functioning of food commodity markets and their derivatives and facilitate timely access to market information, including on food reserves, in order to help limit extreme food price volatility	2.c.1 Indicator of food price anomalies	C020c01

=== Goal 3: Ensure healthy lives and promote well-being for all at all ages ===

Targets (from the 2030 Agenda for Sustainable Development)	Indicators (versions from March 2020)	UNSD Indicator Codes (Note: Indicator codes were developed by UNSD for data transfer, tracking and other statistical purposes.)
3.1 By 2030, reduce the global maternal mortality ratio to less than 70 per 100,000 live births	3.1.1 Maternal mortality ratio	C030101
3.1 By 2030, reduce the global maternal mortality ratio to less than 70 per 100,000 live births	3.1.2 Proportion of births attended by skilled health personnel	C030102
3.2 By 2030, end preventable deaths of newborns and children under 5 years of age, with all countries aiming to reduce neonatal mortality to at least as low as 12 per 1,000 live births and under‑5 mortality to at least as low as 25 per 1,000 live births	3.2.1 Under‑5 mortality rate	C030201
3.2 By 2030, end preventable deaths of newborns and children under 5 years of age, with all countries aiming to reduce neonatal mortality to at least as low as 12 per 1,000 live births and under‑5 mortality to at least as low as 25 per 1,000 live births	3.2.2 Neonatal mortality rate	C030202
3.3 By 2030, end the epidemics of AIDS, tuberculosis, malaria and neglected tropical diseases and combat hepatitis, water-borne diseases and other communicable diseases	3.3.1 Number of new HIV infections per 1,000 uninfected population, by sex, age and key populations	C030301
3.3 By 2030, end the epidemics of AIDS, tuberculosis, malaria and neglected tropical diseases and combat hepatitis, water-borne diseases and other communicable diseases	3.3.2 Tuberculosis incidence per 100,000 population	C030302
3.3 By 2030, end the epidemics of AIDS, tuberculosis, malaria and neglected tropical diseases and combat hepatitis, water-borne diseases and other communicable diseases	3.3.3 Malaria incidence per 1,000 population	C030303
3.3 By 2030, end the epidemics of AIDS, tuberculosis, malaria and neglected tropical diseases and combat hepatitis, water-borne diseases and other communicable diseases	3.3.4 Hepatitis B incidence per 100,000 population	C030304
3.3 By 2030, end the epidemics of AIDS, tuberculosis, malaria and neglected tropical diseases and combat hepatitis, water-borne diseases and other communicable diseases	3.3.5 Number of people requiring interventions against neglected tropical diseases	C030305
3.4 By 2030, reduce by one third premature mortality from non-communicable diseases through prevention and treatment and promote mental health and well-being	3.4.1 Mortality rate attributed to cardiovascular disease, cancer, diabetes or chronic respiratory disease	C030401
3.4 By 2030, reduce by one third premature mortality from non-communicable diseases through prevention and treatment and promote mental health and well-being	3.4.2 Suicide mortality rate	C030402
3.5 Strengthen the prevention and treatment of substance abuse, including narcotic drug abuse and harmful use of alcohol	3.5.1 Coverage of treatment interventions (pharmacological, psychosocial and rehabilitation and aftercare services) for substance use disorders	C030501
3.5 Strengthen the prevention and treatment of substance abuse, including narcotic drug abuse and harmful use of alcohol	3.5.2 Alcohol per capita consumption (aged 15 years and older) within a calendar year in litres of pure alcohol	C030502
3.6 By 2020, halve the number of global deaths and injuries from road traffic accidents	3.6.1 Death rate due to road traffic injuries	C030601
3.7 By 2030, ensure universal access to sexual and reproductive health-care services, including for family planning, information and education, and the integration of reproductive health into national strategies and programmes	3.7.1 Proportion of women of reproductive age (aged 15–49 years) who have their need for family planning satisfied with modern methods	C030701
3.7 By 2030, ensure universal access to sexual and reproductive health-care services, including for family planning, information and education, and the integration of reproductive health into national strategies and programmes	3.7.2 Adolescent birth rate (aged 10–14 years; aged 15–19 years) per 1,000 women in that age group	C030702
3.8 Achieve universal health coverage, including financial risk protection, access to quality essential health-care services and access to safe, effective, quality and affordable essential medicines and vaccines for all	3.8.1 Coverage of essential health services	C030801
3.8 Achieve universal health coverage, including financial risk protection, access to quality essential health-care services and access to safe, effective, quality and affordable essential medicines and vaccines for all	3.8.2 Proportion of population with large household expenditures on health as a share of total household expenditure or income	C030802
3.9 By 2030, substantially reduce the number of deaths and illnesses from hazardous chemicals and air, water and soil pollution and contamination	3.9.1 Mortality rate attributed to household and ambient air pollution	C030901
3.9 By 2030, substantially reduce the number of deaths and illnesses from hazardous chemicals and air, water and soil pollution and contamination	3.9.2 Mortality rate attributed to unsafe water, unsafe sanitation and lack of hygiene (exposure to unsafe Water, Sanitation and Hygiene for All (WASH) services)	C030902
3.9 By 2030, substantially reduce the number of deaths and illnesses from hazardous chemicals and air, water and soil pollution and contamination	3.9.3 Mortality rate attributed to unintentional poisoning	C030903
3.a Strengthen the implementation of the World Health Organization Framework Convention on Tobacco Control in all countries, as appropriate	3.a.1 Age-standardized prevalence of current tobacco use among persons aged 15 years and older	C030a01
3.b Support the research and development of vaccines and medicines for the communicable and non‑communicable diseases that primarily affect developing countries, provide access to affordable essential medicines and vaccines, in accordance with the Doha Declaration on the TRIPS Agreement and Public Health, which affirms the right of developing countries to use to the full the provisions in the Agreement on Trade-Related Aspects of Intellectual Property Rights regarding flexibilities to protect public health, and, in particular, provide access to medicines for all	3.b.1 Proportion of the target population covered by all vaccines included in their national programme	C030b01
	3.b.2 Total net official development assistance to medical research and basic health sectors	C030b02
	3.b.3 Proportion of health facilities that have a core set of relevant essential medicines available and affordable on a sustainable basis	C030b03
3.c Substantially increase health financing and the recruitment, development, training and retention of the health workforce in developing countries, especially in least developed countries and small island developing States	3.c.1 Health worker density and distribution	C030c01
3.d Strengthen the capacity of all countries, in particular developing countries, for early warning, risk reduction and management of national and global health risks	3.d.1 International Health Regulations (IHR) capacity and health emergency preparedness	C030d01
3.d Strengthen the capacity of all countries, in particular developing countries, for early warning, risk reduction and management of national and global health risks	3.d.2 Percentage of bloodstream infections due to selected antimicrobial-resistant organisms (Note: Refinement of the indicator name approved by the Inter-agency and Expert Group on SDG Indicators (IAEG-SDGs) on 13 March and 2 April 2020. Final approval pending the 52nd session of the Statistical Commission in March 2021.)	C030d02

=== Goal 4: Ensure inclusive and equitable quality education and promote lifelong learning opportunities for all ===

Targets (from the 2030 Agenda for Sustainable Development)	Indicators (versions from March 2020)	UNSD Indicator Codes (Note: Indicator codes were developed by UNSD for data transfer, tracking and other statistical purposes.)
4.1 By 2030, ensure that all girls and boys complete free, equitable and quality primary and secondary education leading to relevant and effective learning outcomes	4.1.1 Proportion of children and young people (a) in grades 2/3; (b) at the end of primary; and (c) at the end of lower secondary achieving at least a minimum proficiency level in (i) reading and (ii) mathematics, by sex	C040101
4.1 By 2030, ensure that all girls and boys complete free, equitable and quality primary and secondary education leading to relevant and effective learning outcomes	4.1.2 Completion rate (primary education, lower secondary education, upper secondary education)	C040102
4.2 By 2030, ensure that all girls and boys have access to quality early childhood development, care and pre‑primary education so that they are ready for primary education	4.2.1 Proportion of children aged 24–59 months who are developmentally on track in health, learning and psychosocial well-being, by sex (Note: Refinement of the indicator name approved by the Inter-agency and Expert Group on SDG Indicators (IAEG-SDGs) on 13 March and 2 April 2020. Final approval pending the 52nd session of the Statistical Commission in March 2021.)	C040201
4.2 By 2030, ensure that all girls and boys have access to quality early childhood development, care and pre‑primary education so that they are ready for primary education	4.2.2 Participation rate in organized learning (one year before the official primary entry age), by sex	C040202
4.3 By 2030, ensure equal access for all women and men to affordable and quality technical, vocational and tertiary education, including university	4.3.1 Participation rate of youth and adults in formal and non-formal education and training in the previous 12 months, by sex	C040301
4.4 By 2030, substantially increase the number of youth and adults who have relevant skills, including technical and vocational skills, for employment, decent jobs and entrepreneurship	4.4.1 Proportion of youth and adults with information and communications technology (ICT) skills, by type of skill	C040401
4.5 By 2030, eliminate gender disparities in education and ensure equal access to all levels of education and vocational training for the vulnerable, including persons with disabilities, indigenous peoples and children in vulnerable situations	4.5.1 Parity indices (female/male, rural/urban, bottom/top wealth quintile and others such as disability status, indigenous peoples and conflict-affected, as data become available) for all education indicators on this list that can be disaggregated	C040501
4.6 By 2030, ensure that all youth and a substantial proportion of adults, both men and women, achieve literacy and numeracy	4.6.1 Proportion of population in a given age group achieving at least a fixed level of proficiency in functional (a) literacy and (b) numeracy skills, by sex	C040601
4.7 By 2030, ensure that all learners acquire the knowledge and skills needed to promote sustainable development, including, among others, through education for sustainable development and sustainable lifestyles, human rights, gender equality, promotion of a culture of peace and non-violence, global citizenship and appreciation of cultural diversity and of culture's contribution to sustainable development	4.7.1 Extent to which (i) global citizenship education and (ii) education for sustainable development are mainstreamed in (a) national education policies; (b) curricula; (c) teacher education; and (d) student assessment	C200306
4.a Build and upgrade education facilities that are child, disability and gender sensitive and provide safe, non-violent, inclusive and effective learning environments for all	4.a.1 Proportion of schools offering basic services, by type of service	C040a01
4.b By 2020, substantially expand globally the number of scholarships available to developing countries, in particular least developed countries, small island developing States and African countries, for enrolment in higher education, including vocational training and information and communications technology, technical, engineering and scientific programmes, in developed countries and other developing countries	4.b.1 Volume of official development assistance flows for scholarships by sector and type of study	C040b01
4.c By 2030, substantially increase the supply of qualified teachers, including through international cooperation for teacher training in developing countries, especially least developed countries and small island developing States	4.c.1 Proportion of teachers with the minimum required qualifications, by education level (Note: Refinement of the indicator name approved by the Inter-agency and Expert Group on SDG Indicators (IAEG-SDGs) on 13 March and 2 April 2020. Final approval pending the 52nd session of the Statistical Commission in March 2021.)	C040c01

=== Goal 5: Achieve gender equality and empower all women and girls ===

Targets (from the 2030 Agenda for Sustainable Development)	Indicators (versions from March 2020)	UNSD Indicator Codes (Note: Indicator codes were developed by UNSD for data transfer, tracking and other statistical purposes.)
5.1 End all forms of discrimination against all women and girls everywhere	5.1.1 Whether or not legal frameworks are in place to promote, enforce and monitor equality and non‑discrimination on the basis of sex	C050101
5.2 Eliminate all forms of violence against all women and girls in the public and private spheres, including trafficking and sexual and other types of exploitation	5.2.1 Proportion of ever-partnered women and girls aged 15 years and older subjected to physical, sexual or psychological violence by a current or former intimate partner in the previous 12 months, by form of violence and by age	C050201
5.2 Eliminate all forms of violence against all women and girls in the public and private spheres, including trafficking and sexual and other types of exploitation	5.2.2 Proportion of women and girls aged 15 years and older subjected to sexual violence by persons other than an intimate partner in the previous 12 months, by age and place of occurrence	C050202
5.3 Eliminate all harmful practices, such as child, early and forced marriage and female genital mutilation	5.3.1 Proportion of women aged 20–24 years who were married or in a union before age 15 and before age 18	C050301
5.3 Eliminate all harmful practices, such as child, early and forced marriage and female genital mutilation	5.3.2 Proportion of girls and women aged 15–49 years who have undergone female genital mutilation/cutting, by age	C050302
5.4 Recognize and value unpaid care and domestic work through the provision of public services, infrastructure and social protection policies and the promotion of shared responsibility within the household and the family as nationally appropriate	5.4.1 Proportion of time spent on unpaid domestic and care work, by sex, age and location	C050401
5.5 Ensure women's full and effective participation and equal opportunities for leadership at all levels of decision-making in political, economic and public life	5.5.1 Proportion of seats held by women in (a) national parliaments and (b) local governments	C050501
5.5 Ensure women's full and effective participation and equal opportunities for leadership at all levels of decision-making in political, economic and public life	5.5.2 Proportion of women in managerial positions	C050502
5.6 Ensure universal access to sexual and reproductive health and reproductive rights as agreed in accordance with the Programme of Action of the International Conference on Population and Development and the Beijing Platform for Action and the outcome documents of their review conferences	5.6.1 Proportion of women aged 15–49 years who make their own informed decisions regarding sexual relations, contraceptive use and reproductive health care	C050601
5.6 Ensure universal access to sexual and reproductive health and reproductive rights as agreed in accordance with the Programme of Action of the International Conference on Population and Development and the Beijing Platform for Action and the outcome documents of their review conferences	5.6.2 Number of countries with laws and regulations that guarantee full and equal access to women and men aged 15 years and older to sexual and reproductive health care, information and education	C050602
5.a Undertake reforms to give women equal rights to economic resources, as well as access to ownership and control over land and other forms of property, financial services, inheritance and natural resources, in accordance with national laws	5.a.1 (a) Proportion of total agricultural population with ownership or secure rights over agricultural land, by sex; and (b) share of women among owners or rights-bearers of agricultural land, by type of tenure	C050a01
5.a Undertake reforms to give women equal rights to economic resources, as well as access to ownership and control over land and other forms of property, financial services, inheritance and natural resources, in accordance with national laws	5.a.2 Proportion of countries where the legal framework (including customary law) guarantees women's equal rights to land ownership and/or control	C050a02
5.b Enhance the use of enabling technology, in particular information and communications technology, to promote the empowerment of women	5.b.1 Proportion of individuals who own a mobile telephone, by sex	C050b01
5.c Adopt and strengthen sound policies and enforceable legislation for the promotion of gender equality and the empowerment of all women and girls at all levels	5.c.1 Proportion of countries with systems to track and make public allocations for gender equality and women's empowerment	C050c01

=== Goal 6: Ensure availability and sustainable management of water and sanitation for all ===

Targets (from the 2030 Agenda for Sustainable Development)	Indicators (versions from March 2020)	UNSD Indicator Codes (Note: Indicator codes were developed by UNSD for data transfer, tracking and other statistical purposes.)
6.1 By 2030, achieve universal and equitable access to safe and affordable drinking water for all	6.1.1 Proportion of population using safely managed drinking water services	C060101
6.2 By 2030, achieve access to adequate and equitable sanitation and hygiene for all and end open defecation, paying special attention to the needs of women and girls and those in vulnerable situations	6.2.1 Proportion of population using (a) safely managed sanitation services and (b) a hand washing facility with soap and water	C060201
6.3 By 2030, improve water quality by reducing pollution, eliminating dumping and minimizing release of hazardous chemicals and materials, halving the proportion of untreated wastewater and substantially increasing recycling and safe reuse globally	6.3.1 Proportion of domestic and industrial wastewater flows safely treated	C060303
6.3 By 2030, improve water quality by reducing pollution, eliminating dumping and minimizing release of hazardous chemicals and materials, halving the proportion of untreated wastewater and substantially increasing recycling and safe reuse globally	6.3.2 Proportion of bodies of water with good ambient water quality	C060302
6.4 By 2030, substantially increase water-use efficiency across all sectors and ensure sustainable withdrawals and supply of freshwater to address water scarcity and substantially reduce the number of people suffering from water scarcity	6.4.1 Change in water-use efficiency over time	C060401
6.4 By 2030, substantially increase water-use efficiency across all sectors and ensure sustainable withdrawals and supply of freshwater to address water scarcity and substantially reduce the number of people suffering from water scarcity	6.4.2 Level of water stress: freshwater withdrawal as a proportion of available freshwater resources	C060402
6.5 By 2030, implement integrated water resources management at all levels, including through transboundary cooperation as appropriate	6.5.1 Degree of integrated water resources management	C060501
6.5 By 2030, implement integrated water resources management at all levels, including through transboundary cooperation as appropriate	6.5.2 Proportion of transboundary basin area with an operational arrangement for water cooperation	C060502
6.6 By 2020, protect and restore water-related ecosystems, including mountains, forests, wetlands, rivers, aquifers and lakes	6.6.1 Change in the extent of water-related ecosystems over time	C060601
6.a By 2030, expand international cooperation and capacity-building support to developing countries in water- and sanitation-related activities and programmes, including water harvesting, desalination, water efficiency, wastewater treatment, recycling and reuse technologies	6.a.1 Amount of water- and sanitation-related official development assistance that is part of a government-coordinated spending plan	C060a01
6.b Support and strengthen the participation of local communities in improving water and sanitation management	6.b.1 Proportion of local administrative units with established and operational policies and procedures for participation of local communities in water and sanitation management	C060b01

=== Goal 7: Ensure access to affordable, reliable, sustainable and modern energy for all ===

Targets (from the 2030 Agenda for Sustainable Development)	Indicators (versions from March 2020)	UNSD Indicator Codes (Note: Indicator codes were developed by UNSD for data transfer, tracking and other statistical purposes.)
7.1 By 2030, ensure universal access to affordable, reliable and modern energy services	7.1.1 Proportion of population with access to electricity	C070101
7.1 By 2030, ensure universal access to affordable, reliable and modern energy services	7.1.2 Proportion of population with primary reliance on clean fuels and technology	C070102
7.2 By 2030, increase substantially the share of renewable energy in the global energy mix	7.2.1 Renewable energy share in the total final energy consumption	C070201
7.3 By 2030, double the global rate of improvement in energy efficiency	7.3.1 Energy intensity measured in terms of primary energy and GDP	C070301
7.a By 2030, enhance international cooperation to facilitate access to clean energy research and technology, including renewable energy, energy efficiency and advanced and cleaner fossil-fuel technology, and promote investment in energy infrastructure and clean energy technology	7.a.1 International financial flows to developing countries in support of clean energy research and development and renewable energy production, including in hybrid systems	C070a01
7.b By 2030, expand infrastructure and upgrade technology for supplying modern and sustainable energy services for all in developing countries, in particular least developed countries, small island developing States and landlocked developing countries, in accordance with their respective programmes of support	7.b.1 Installed renewable energy-generating capacity in developing countries (in watts per capita)	C200208

=== Goal 8: Promote sustained, inclusive and sustainable economic growth, full and productive employment and decent work for all ===

Targets (from the 2030 Agenda for Sustainable Development)	Indicators (versions from March 2020)	UNSD Indicator Codes (Note: Indicator codes were developed by UNSD for data transfer, tracking and other statistical purposes.)
8.1 Sustain per capita economic growth in accordance with national circumstances and, in particular, at least 7 per cent gross domestic product growth per annum in the least developed countries	8.1.1 Annual growth rate of real GDP per capita	C080101
8.2 Achieve higher levels of economic productivity through diversification, technological upgrading and innovation, including through a focus on high-value added and labour-intensive sectors	8.2.1 Annual growth rate of real GDP per employed person	C080201
8.3 Promote development-oriented policies that support productive activities, decent job creation, entrepreneurship, creativity and innovation, and encourage the formalization and growth of micro-, small- and medium-sized enterprises, including through access to financial services	8.3.1 Proportion of informal employment in total employment, by sector and sex	C080302
8.4 Improve progressively, through 2030, global resource efficiency in consumption and production and endeavour to decouple economic growth from environmental degradation, in accordance with the 10‑Year Framework of Programmes on Sustainable Consumption and Production, with developed countries taking the lead	8.4.1 Material footprint, material footprint per capita, and material footprint per GDP	C200202
8.4 Improve progressively, through 2030, global resource efficiency in consumption and production and endeavour to decouple economic growth from environmental degradation, in accordance with the 10‑Year Framework of Programmes on Sustainable Consumption and Production, with developed countries taking the lead	8.4.2 Domestic material consumption, domestic material consumption per capita, and domestic material consumption per GDP	C200203
8.5 By 2030, achieve full and productive employment and decent work for all women and men, including for young people and persons with disabilities, and equal pay for work of equal value	8.5.1 Average hourly earnings of employees, by sex, age, occupation and persons with disabilities	C080501
8.5 By 2030, achieve full and productive employment and decent work for all women and men, including for young people and persons with disabilities, and equal pay for work of equal value	8.5.2 Unemployment rate, by sex, age and persons with disabilities	C080502
8.6 By 2020, substantially reduce the proportion of youth not in employment, education or training	8.6.1 Proportion of youth (aged 15–24 years) not in education, employment or training	C080601
8.7 Take immediate and effective measures to eradicate forced labour, end modern slavery and human trafficking and secure the prohibition and elimination of the worst forms of child labour, including recruitment and use of child soldiers, and by 2025 end child labour in all its forms	8.7.1 Proportion and number of children aged 5–17 years engaged in child labour, by sex and age	C080701
8.8 Protect labour rights and promote safe and secure working environments for all workers, including migrant workers, in particular women migrants, and those in precarious employment	8.8.1 Fatal and non-fatal occupational injuries per 100,000 workers, by sex and migrant status	C080801
8.8 Protect labour rights and promote safe and secure working environments for all workers, including migrant workers, in particular women migrants, and those in precarious employment	8.8.2 Level of national compliance with labour rights (freedom of association and collective bargaining) based on International Labour Organization (ILO) textual sources and national legislation, by sex and migrant status	C080802
8.9 By 2030, devise and implement policies to promote sustainable tourism that creates jobs and promotes local culture and products	8.9.1 Tourism direct GDP as a proportion of total GDP and in growth rate	C080901
8.10 Strengthen the capacity of domestic financial institutions to encourage and expand access to banking, insurance and financial services for all	8.10.1 (a) Number of commercial bank branches per 100,000 adults and (b) number of automated teller machines (ATMs) per 100,000 adults	C081001
8.10 Strengthen the capacity of domestic financial institutions to encourage and expand access to banking, insurance and financial services for all	8.10.2 Proportion of adults (15 years and older) with an account at a bank or other financial institution or with a mobile-money-service provider	C081002
8.a Increase Aid for Trade support for developing countries, in particular least developed countries, including through the Enhanced Integrated Framework for Trade-related Technical Assistance to Least Developed Countries	8.a.1 Aid for Trade commitments and disbursements	C080a01
8.b By 2020, develop and operationalize a global strategy for youth employment and implement the Global Jobs Pact of the International Labour Organization	8.b.1 Existence of a developed and operationalized national strategy for youth employment, as a distinct strategy or as part of a national employment strategy	C080b01

=== Goal 9: Build resilient infrastructure, promote inclusive and sustainable industrialization and foster innovation ===

Targets (from the 2030 Agenda for Sustainable Development)	Indicators (versions from March 2020)	UNSD Indicator Codes (Note: Indicator codes were developed by UNSD for data transfer, tracking and other statistical purposes.)
9.1 Develop quality, reliable, sustainable and resilient infrastructure, including regional and transborder infrastructure, to support economic development and human well-being, with a focus on affordable and equitable access for all	9.1.1 Proportion of the rural population who live within 2 km of an all-season road	C090101
9.1 Develop quality, reliable, sustainable and resilient infrastructure, including regional and transborder infrastructure, to support economic development and human well-being, with a focus on affordable and equitable access for all	9.1.2 Passenger and freight volumes, by mode of transport	C090102
9.2 Promote inclusive and sustainable industrialization and, by 2030, significantly raise industry's share of employment and gross domestic product, in line with national circumstances, and double its share in least developed countries	9.2.1 Manufacturing value added as a proportion of GDP and per capita	C090201
9.2 Promote inclusive and sustainable industrialization and, by 2030, significantly raise industry's share of employment and gross domestic product, in line with national circumstances, and double its share in least developed countries	9.2.2 Manufacturing employment as a proportion of total employment	C090202
9.3 Increase the access of small-scale industrial and other enterprises, in particular in developing countries, to financial services, including affordable credit, and their integration into value chains and markets	9.3.1 Proportion of small-scale industries in total industry value added	C090301
9.3 Increase the access of small-scale industrial and other enterprises, in particular in developing countries, to financial services, including affordable credit, and their integration into value chains and markets	9.3.2 Proportion of small-scale industries with a loan or line of credit	C090302
9.4 By 2030, upgrade infrastructure and retrofit industries to make them sustainable, with increased resource-use efficiency and greater adoption of clean and environmentally sound technologies and industrial processes, with all countries taking action in accordance with their respective capabilities	9.4.1 CO2 emission per unit of value added	C090401
9.5 Enhance scientific research, upgrade the technological capabilities of industrial sectors in all countries, in particular developing countries, including, by 2030, encouraging innovation and substantially increasing the number of research and development workers per 1 million people and public and private research and development spending	9.5.1 Research and development expenditure as a proportion of GDP	C090501
9.5 Enhance scientific research, upgrade the technological capabilities of industrial sectors in all countries, in particular developing countries, including, by 2030, encouraging innovation and substantially increasing the number of research and development workers per 1 million people and public and private research and development spending	9.5.2 Researchers (in full-time equivalent) per million inhabitants	C090502
9.a Facilitate sustainable and resilient infrastructure development in developing countries through enhanced financial, technological and technical support to African countries, least developed countries, landlocked developing countries and small island developing States	9.a.1 Total official international support (official development assistance plus other official flows) to infrastructure	C090a01
9.b Support domestic technology development, research and innovation in developing countries, including by ensuring a conducive policy environment for, inter alia, industrial diversification and value addition to commodities	9.b.1 Proportion of medium and high-tech industry value added in total value added	C090b01
9.c Significantly increase access to information and communications technology and strive to provide universal and affordable access to the Internet in least developed countries by 2020	9.c.1 Proportion of population covered by a mobile network, by technology	C090c01

=== Goal 10: Reduce inequality within and among countries ===

Targets (from the 2030 Agenda for Sustainable Development)	Indicators (versions from March 2020)	UNSD Indicator Codes (Note: Indicator codes were developed by UNSD for data transfer, tracking and other statistical purposes.)
10.1 By 2030, progressively achieve and sustain income growth of the bottom 40 per cent of the population at a rate higher than the national average	10.1.1 Growth rates of household expenditure or income per capita among the bottom 40 per cent of the population and the total population	C100101
10.2 By 2030, empower and promote the social, economic and political inclusion of all, irrespective of age, sex, disability, race, ethnicity, origin, religion or economic or other status	10.2.1 Proportion of people living below 50 per cent of median income, by sex, age and persons with disabilities	C100201
10.3 Ensure equal opportunity and reduce inequalities of outcome, including by eliminating discriminatory laws, policies and practices and promoting appropriate legislation, policies and action in this regard	10.3.1 Proportion of population reporting having personally felt discriminated against or harassed in the previous 12 months on the basis of a ground of discrimination prohibited under international human rights law	C200204
10.4 Adopt policies, especially fiscal, wage and social protection policies, and progressively achieve greater equality	10.4.1 Labour share of GDP	C100401
10.4 Adopt policies, especially fiscal, wage and social protection policies, and progressively achieve greater equality	10.4.2 Redistributive impact of fiscal policy (Note: Taking into account ongoing World Trade Organization negotiations, the Doha Development Agenda and the Hong Kong ministerial mandate.)	C100402
10.5 Improve the regulation and monitoring of global financial markets and institutions and strengthen the implementation of such regulations	10.5.1 Financial Soundness Indicators	C100501
10.6 Ensure enhanced representation and voice for developing countries in decision-making in global international economic and financial institutions in order to deliver more effective, credible, accountable and legitimate institutions	10.6.1 Proportion of members and voting rights of developing countries in international organizations	C200205
10.7 Facilitate orderly, safe, regular and responsible migration and mobility of people, including through the implementation of planned and well-managed migration policies	10.7.1 Recruitment cost borne by employee as a proportion of monthly income earned in country of destination	C100701
10.7 Facilitate orderly, safe, regular and responsible migration and mobility of people, including through the implementation of planned and well-managed migration policies	10.7.2 Number of countries with migration policies that facilitate orderly, safe, regular and responsible migration and mobility of people	C100702
10.7 Facilitate orderly, safe, regular and responsible migration and mobility of people, including through the implementation of planned and well-managed migration policies	10.7.3 Number of people who died or disappeared in the process of migration towards an international destination (Note: Refinement of the indicator name approved by the Inter-agency and Expert Group on SDG Indicators (IAEG-SDGs) on 13 March and 2 April 2020. Final approval pending the 52nd session of the Statistical Commission in March 2021.)	C100703
10.7 Facilitate orderly, safe, regular and responsible migration and mobility of people, including through the implementation of planned and well-managed migration policies	10.7.4 Proportion of the population who are refugees, by country of origin	C100704
10.a Implement the principle of special and differential treatment for developing countries, in particular least developed countries, in accordance with World Trade Organization agreements	10.a.1 Proportion of tariff lines applied to imports from least developed countries and developing countries with zero-tariff	C100a01
10.b Encourage official development assistance and financial flows, including foreign direct investment, to States where the need is greatest, in particular least developed countries, African countries, small island developing States and landlocked developing countries, in accordance with their national plans and programmes	10.b.1 Total resource flows for development, by recipient and donor countries and type of flow (e.g. official development assistance, foreign direct investment and other flows)	C100b01
10.c By 2030, reduce to less than 3 per cent the transaction costs of migrant remittances and eliminate remittance corridors with costs higher than 5 per cent	10.c.1 Remittance costs as a proportion of the amount remitted	C100c01

=== Goal 11: Make cities and human settlements inclusive, safe, resilient and sustainable ===

Targets (from the 2030 Agenda for Sustainable Development)	Indicators (versions from March 2020)	UNSD Indicator Codes (Note: Indicator codes were developed by UNSD for data transfer, tracking and other statistical purposes.)
11.1 By 2030, ensure access for all to adequate, safe and affordable housing and basic services and upgrade slums	11.1.1 Proportion of urban population living in slums, informal settlements or inadequate housing	C110101
11.2 By 2030, provide access to safe, affordable, accessible and sustainable transport systems for all, improving road safety, notably by expanding public transport, with special attention to the needs of those in vulnerable situations, women, children, persons with disabilities and older persons	11.2.1 Proportion of population that has convenient access to public transport, by sex, age and persons with disabilities	C110201
11.3 By 2030, enhance inclusive and sustainable urbanization and capacity for participatory, integrated and sustainable human settlement planning and management in all countries	11.3.1 Ratio of land consumption rate to population growth rate	C110301
11.3 By 2030, enhance inclusive and sustainable urbanization and capacity for participatory, integrated and sustainable human settlement planning and management in all countries	11.3.2 Proportion of cities with a direct participation structure of civil society in urban planning and management that operate regularly and democratically	C110302
11.4 Strengthen efforts to protect and safeguard the world's cultural and natural heritage	11.4.1 Total per capita expenditure on the preservation, protection and conservation of all cultural and natural heritage, by source of funding (public, private), type of heritage (cultural, natural) and level of government (national, regional, and local/municipal)	C110401
11.5 By 2030, significantly reduce the number of deaths and the number of people affected and substantially decrease the direct economic losses relative to global gross domestic product caused by disasters, including water-related disasters, with a focus on protecting the poor and people in vulnerable situations	11.5.1 Number of deaths, missing persons and directly affected persons attributed to disasters per 100,000 population	C200303
11.5 By 2030, significantly reduce the number of deaths and the number of people affected and substantially decrease the direct economic losses relative to global gross domestic product caused by disasters, including water-related disasters, with a focus on protecting the poor and people in vulnerable situations	11.5.2 Direct economic loss in relation to global GDP, damage to critical infrastructure and number of disruptions to basic services, attributed to disasters	C110502
11.6 By 2030, reduce the adverse per capita environmental impact of cities, including by paying special attention to air quality and municipal and other waste management	11.6.1 Proportion of municipal solid waste collected and managed in controlled facilities out of total municipal waste generated, by cities	C110603
11.6 By 2030, reduce the adverse per capita environmental impact of cities, including by paying special attention to air quality and municipal and other waste management	11.6.2 Annual mean levels of fine particulate matter (e.g. PM2.5 and PM10) in cities (population weighted)	C110602
11.7 By 2030, provide universal access to safe, inclusive and accessible, green and public spaces, in particular for women and children, older persons and persons with disabilities	11.7.1 Average share of the built-up area of cities that is open space for public use for all, by sex, age and persons with disabilities	C110701
11.7 By 2030, provide universal access to safe, inclusive and accessible, green and public spaces, in particular for women and children, older persons and persons with disabilities	11.7.2 Proportion of persons victim of physical or sexual harassment, by sex, age, disability status and place of occurrence, in the previous 12 months	C110702
11.a Support positive economic, social and environmental links between urban, peri-urban and rural areas by strengthening national and regional development planning	11.a.1 Number of countries that have national urban policies or regional development plans that (a) respond to population dynamics; (b) ensure balanced territorial development; and (c) increase local fiscal space	C110a02
11.b By 2020, substantially increase the number of cities and human settlements adopting and implementing integrated policies and plans towards inclusion, resource efficiency, mitigation and adaptation to climate change, resilience to disasters, and develop and implement, in line with the Sendai Framework for Disaster Risk Reduction 2015–2030, holistic disaster risk management at all levels	11.b.1 Number of countries that adopt and implement national disaster risk reduction strategies in line with the Sendai Framework for Disaster Risk Reduction 2015–2030	C200304
11.b By 2020, substantially increase the number of cities and human settlements adopting and implementing integrated policies and plans towards inclusion, resource efficiency, mitigation and adaptation to climate change, resilience to disasters, and develop and implement, in line with the Sendai Framework for Disaster Risk Reduction 2015–2030, holistic disaster risk management at all levels	11.b.2 Proportion of local governments that adopt and implement local disaster risk reduction strategies in line with national disaster risk reduction strategies	C200305
11.c Support least developed countries, including through financial and technical assistance, in building sustainable and resilient buildings utilizing local materials	No suitable replacement indicator was proposed. The global statistical community is encouraged to work to develop an indicator that could be proposed for the 2025 comprehensive review. See E/CN.3/2020/2, paragraph 23.	

=== Goal 12: Ensure sustainable consumption and production patterns ===

Targets (from the 2030 Agenda for Sustainable Development)	Indicators (versions from March 2020)	UNSD Indicator Codes (Note: Indicator codes were developed by UNSD for data transfer, tracking and other statistical purposes.)
12.1 Implement the 10‑Year Framework of Programmes on Sustainable Consumption and Production Patterns, all countries taking action, with developed countries taking the lead, taking into account the development and capabilities of developing countries	12.1.1 Number of countries developing, adopting or implementing policy instruments aimed at supporting the shift to sustainable consumption and production	C120101
12.2 By 2030, achieve the sustainable management and efficient use of natural resources	12.2.1 Material footprint, material footprint per capita, and material footprint per GDP	C200202
12.2 By 2030, achieve the sustainable management and efficient use of natural resources	12.2.2 Domestic material consumption, domestic material consumption per capita, and domestic material consumption per GDP	C200203
12.3 By 2030, halve per capita global food waste at the retail and consumer levels and reduce food losses along production and supply chains, including post-harvest losses	12.3.1 (a) Food loss index and (b) food waste index	C120301
12.4 By 2020, achieve the environmentally sound management of chemicals and all wastes throughout their life cycle, in accordance with agreed international frameworks, and significantly reduce their release to air, water and soil in order to minimize their adverse impacts on human health and the environment	12.4.1 Number of parties to international multilateral environmental agreements on hazardous waste, and other chemicals that meet their commitments and obligations in transmitting information as required by each relevant agreement	C120401
12.4 By 2020, achieve the environmentally sound management of chemicals and all wastes throughout their life cycle, in accordance with agreed international frameworks, and significantly reduce their release to air, water and soil in order to minimize their adverse impacts on human health and the environment	12.4.2 (a) Hazardous waste generated per capita; and (b) proportion of hazardous waste treated, by type of treatment	C120402
12.5 By 2030, substantially reduce waste generation through prevention, reduction, recycling and reuse	12.5.1 National recycling rate, tons of material recycled	C120501
12.6 Encourage companies, especially large and transnational companies, to adopt sustainable practices and to integrate sustainability information into their reporting cycle	12.6.1 Number of companies publishing sustainability reports	C120601
12.7 Promote public procurement practices that are sustainable, in accordance with national policies and priorities	12.7.1 Degree of sustainable public procurement policies and action plan implementation	C120701
12.8 By 2030, ensure that people everywhere have the relevant information and awareness for sustainable development and lifestyles in harmony with nature	12.8.1 Extent to which (i) global citizenship education and (ii) education for sustainable development are mainstreamed in (a) national education policies; (b) curricula; (c) teacher education; and (d) student assessment	C200306
12.a Support developing countries to strengthen their scientific and technological capacity to move towards more sustainable patterns of consumption and production	12.a.1 Installed renewable energy-generating capacity in developing countries (in watts per capita)	C200208
12.b Develop and implement tools to monitor sustainable development impacts for sustainable tourism that creates jobs and promotes local culture and products	12.b.1 Implementation of standard accounting tools to monitor the economic and environmental aspects of tourism sustainability	C120b02
12.c Rationalize inefficient fossil fuel subsidies that encourage wasteful consumption by removing market distortions, in accordance with national circumstances, including by restructuring taxation and phasing out those harmful subsidies, where they exist, to reflect their environmental impacts, taking fully into account the specific needs and conditions of developing countries and minimizing the possible adverse impacts on their development in a manner that protects the poor and the affected communities	12.c.1 Amount of fossil-fuel subsidies per unit of GDP (production and consumption) (Note: Refinement of the indicator name approved by the Inter-agency and Expert Group on SDG Indicators (IAEG-SDGs) on 13 March and 2 April 2020. Final approval pending the 52nd session of the Statistical Commission in March 2021.)	C120c01

=== Goal 13: Take urgent action to combat climate change and its impacts ===

Targets (from the 2030 Agenda for Sustainable Development) (Note: Acknowledging that the United Nations Framework Convention on Climate Change is the primary international, intergovernmental forum for negotiating the global response to climate change.)	Indicators (versions from March 2020)	UNSD Indicator Codes (Note: Indicator codes were developed by UNSD for data transfer, tracking and other statistical purposes.)
13.1 Strengthen resilience and adaptive capacity to climate-related hazards and natural disasters in all countries	13.1.1 Number of deaths, missing persons and directly affected persons attributed to disasters per 100,000 population	C200303
13.1 Strengthen resilience and adaptive capacity to climate-related hazards and natural disasters in all countries	13.1.2 Number of countries that adopt and implement national disaster risk reduction strategies in line with the Sendai Framework for Disaster Risk Reduction 2015–2030	C200304
13.1 Strengthen resilience and adaptive capacity to climate-related hazards and natural disasters in all countries	13.1.3 Proportion of local governments that adopt and implement local disaster risk reduction strategies in line with national disaster risk reduction strategies	C200305
13.2 Integrate climate change measures into national policies, strategies and planning	13.2.1 Number of countries with nationally determined contributions, long-term strategies, national adaptation plans, strategies as reported in adaptation communications and national communications	C130203
13.2 Integrate climate change measures into national policies, strategies and planning	13.2.2 Total greenhouse gas emissions per year	C130202
13.3 Improve education, awareness-raising and human and institutional capacity on climate change mitigation, adaptation, impact reduction and early warning	13.3.1 Extent to which (i) global citizenship education and (ii) education for sustainable development are mainstreamed in (a) national education policies; (b) curricula; (c) teacher education; and (d) student assessment	C200306
13.a Implement the commitment undertaken by developed-country parties to the United Nations Framework Convention on Climate Change to a goal of mobilizing jointly $100 billion annually by 2020 from all sources to address the needs of developing countries in the context of meaningful mitigation actions and transparency on implementation and fully operationalize the Green Climate Fund through its capitalization as soon as possible	13.a.1 Amounts provided and mobilized in United States dollars per year in relation to the continued existing collective mobilization goal of the $100 billion commitment through to 2025	C130a02
13.b Promote mechanisms for raising capacity for effective climate change-related planning and management in least developed countries and small island developing States, including focusing on women, youth and local and marginalized communities	13.b.1 Number of least developed countries and small island developing States with nationally determined contributions, long-term strategies, national adaptation plans, strategies as reported in adaptation communications and national communications	C130b02

=== Goal 14: Conserve and sustainably use the oceans, seas and marine resources for sustainable development ===

Targets (from the 2030 Agenda for Sustainable Development)	Indicators (versions from March 2020)	UNSD Indicator Codes (Note: Indicator codes were developed by UNSD for data transfer, tracking and other statistical purposes.)
14.1 By 2025, prevent and significantly reduce marine pollution of all kinds, in particular from land-based activities, including marine debris and nutrient pollution	14.1.1 (a) Index of coastal eutrophication; and (b) plastic debris density (Note: Refinement of the indicator name approved by the Inter-agency and Expert Group on SDG Indicators (IAEG-SDGs) on 13 March and 2 April 2020. Final approval pending the 52nd session of the Statistical Commission in March 2021.)	C140101
14.2 By 2020, sustainably manage and protect marine and coastal ecosystems to avoid significant adverse impacts, including by strengthening their resilience, and take action for their restoration in order to achieve healthy and productive oceans	14.2.1 Number of countries using ecosystem-based approaches to managing marine areas	C140201
14.3 Minimize and address the impacts of ocean acidification, including through enhanced scientific cooperation at all levels	14.3.1 Average marine acidity (pH) measured at agreed suite of representative sampling stations	C140301
14.4 By 2020, effectively regulate harvesting and end overfishing, illegal, unreported and unregulated fishing and destructive fishing practices and implement science-based management plans, in order to restore fish stocks in the shortest time feasible, at least to levels that can produce maximum sustainable yield as determined by their biological characteristics	14.4.1 Proportion of fish stocks within biologically sustainable levels	C140401
14.5 By 2020, conserve at least 10 per cent of coastal and marine areas, consistent with national and international law and based on the best available scientific information	14.5.1 Coverage of protected areas in relation to marine areas	C140501
14.6 By 2020, prohibit certain forms of fisheries subsidies which contribute to overcapacity and overfishing, eliminate subsidies that contribute to illegal, unreported and unregulated fishing and refrain from introducing new such subsidies, recognizing that appropriate and effective special and differential treatment for developing and least developed countries should be an integral part of the World Trade Organization fisheries subsidies negotiation4	14.6.1 Degree of implementation of international instruments aiming to combat illegal, unreported and unregulated fishing	C140601
14.7 By 2030, increase the economic benefits to small island developing States and least developed countries from the sustainable use of marine resources, including through sustainable management of fisheries, aquaculture and tourism	14.7.1 Sustainable fisheries as a proportion of GDP in small island developing States, least developed countries and all countries	C140701
14.a Increase scientific knowledge, develop research capacity and transfer marine technology, taking into account the Intergovernmental Oceanographic Commission Criteria and Guidelines on the Transfer of Marine Technology, in order to improve ocean health and to enhance the contribution of marine biodiversity to the development of developing countries, in particular small island developing States and least developed countries	14.a.1 Proportion of total research budget allocated to research in the field of marine technology	C140a01
14.b Provide access for small-scale artisanal fishers to marine resources and markets	14.b.1 Degree of application of a legal/regulatory/ policy/institutional framework which recognizes and protects access rights for small-scale fisheries	C140b01
14.c Enhance the conservation and sustainable use of oceans and their resources by implementing international law as reflected in the United Nations Convention on the Law of the Sea, which provides the legal framework for the conservation and sustainable use of oceans and their resources, as recalled in paragraph 158 of "The future we want"	14.c.1 Number of countries making progress in ratifying, accepting and implementing through legal, policy and institutional frameworks, ocean-related instruments that implement international law, as reflected in the United Nations Convention on the Law of the Sea, for the conservation and sustainable use of the oceans and their resources	C140c01

=== Goal 15: Protect, restore and promote sustainable use of terrestrial ecosystems, sustainably manage forests, combat desertification, and halt and reverse land degradation and halt biodiversity loss ===

Targets (from the 2030 Agenda for Sustainable Development)	Indicators (versions from March 2020)	UNSD Indicator Codes (Note: Indicator codes were developed by UNSD for data transfer, tracking and other statistical purposes.)
15.1 By 2020, ensure the conservation, restoration and sustainable use of terrestrial and inland freshwater ecosystems and their services, in particular forests, wetlands, mountains and drylands, in line with obligations under international agreements	15.1.1 Forest area as a proportion of total land area	C150101
15.1 By 2020, ensure the conservation, restoration and sustainable use of terrestrial and inland freshwater ecosystems and their services, in particular forests, wetlands, mountains and drylands, in line with obligations under international agreements	15.1.2 Proportion of important sites for terrestrial and freshwater biodiversity that are covered by protected areas, by ecosystem type	C150102
15.2 By 2020, promote the implementation of sustainable management of all types of forests, halt deforestation, restore degraded forests and substantially increase afforestation and reforestation globally	15.2.1 Progress towards sustainable forest management	C150201
15.3 By 2030, combat desertification, restore degraded land and soil, including land affected by desertification, drought and floods, and strive to achieve a land degradation-neutral world	15.3.1 Proportion of land that is degraded over total land area	C150301
15.4 By 2030, ensure the conservation of mountain ecosystems, including their biodiversity, in order to enhance their capacity to provide benefits that are essential for sustainable development	15.4.1 Coverage by protected areas of important sites for mountain biodiversity	C150401
15.4 By 2030, ensure the conservation of mountain ecosystems, including their biodiversity, in order to enhance their capacity to provide benefits that are essential for sustainable development	15.4.2 Mountain Green Cover Index	C150402
15.5 Take urgent and significant action to reduce the degradation of natural habitats, halt the loss of biodiversity and, by 2020, protect and prevent the extinction of threatened species	15.5.1 Red List Index	C150501
15.6 Promote fair and equitable sharing of the benefits arising from the utilization of genetic resources and promote appropriate access to such resources, as internationally agreed	15.6.1 Number of countries that have adopted legislative, administrative and policy frameworks to ensure fair and equitable sharing of benefits	C150601
15.7 Take urgent action to end poaching and trafficking of protected species of flora and fauna and address both demand and supply of illegal wildlife products	15.7.1 Proportion of traded wildlife that was poached or illicitly trafficked	C200206
15.8 By 2020, introduce measures to prevent the introduction and significantly reduce the impact of invasive alien species on land and water ecosystems and control or eradicate the priority species	15.8.1 Proportion of countries adopting relevant national legislation and adequately resourcing the prevention or control of invasive alien species	C150801
15.9 By 2020, integrate ecosystem and biodiversity values into national and local planning, development processes, poverty reduction strategies and accounts	15.9.1 (a) Number of countries that have established national targets in accordance with or similar to Aichi Biodiversity Target 2 of the Strategic Plan for Biodiversity 2011–2020 in their national biodiversity strategy and action plans and the progress reported towards these targets; and (b) integration of biodiversity into national accounting and reporting systems, defined as implementation of the System of Environmental-Economic Accounting	C150902
15.a Mobilize and significantly increase financial resources from all sources to conserve and sustainably use biodiversity and ecosystems	15.a.1 (a) Official development assistance on conservation and sustainable use of biodiversity; and (b) revenue generated and finance mobilized from biodiversity-relevant economic instruments	C200210
15.b Mobilize significant resources from all sources and at all levels to finance sustainable forest management and provide adequate incentives to developing countries to advance such management, including for conservation and reforestation	15.b.1 (a) Official development assistance on conservation and sustainable use of biodiversity; and (b) revenue generated and finance mobilized from biodiversity-relevant economic instruments	C200210
15.c Enhance global support for efforts to combat poaching and trafficking of protected species, including by increasing the capacity of local communities to pursue sustainable livelihood opportunities	15.c.1 Proportion of traded wildlife that was poached or illicitly trafficked	C200206

=== Goal 16: Promote peaceful and inclusive societies for sustainable development, provide access to justice for all and build effective, accountable and inclusive institutions at all levels ===

Targets (from the 2030 Agenda for Sustainable Development)	Indicators (versions from March 2020)	UNSD Indicator Codes (Note: Indicator codes were developed by UNSD for data transfer, tracking and other statistical purposes.)
16.1 Significantly reduce all forms of violence and related death rates everywhere	16.1.1 Number of victims of intentional homicide per 100,000 population, by sex and age	C160101
16.1 Significantly reduce all forms of violence and related death rates everywhere	16.1.2 Conflict-related deaths per 100,000 population, by sex, age and cause	C160102
16.1 Significantly reduce all forms of violence and related death rates everywhere	16.1.3 Proportion of population subjected to (a) physical violence, (b) psychological violence and (c) sexual violence in the previous 12 months	C160103
16.1 Significantly reduce all forms of violence and related death rates everywhere	16.1.4 Proportion of population that feel safe walking alone around the area they live	C160104
16.2 End abuse, exploitation, trafficking and all forms of violence against and torture of children	16.2.1 Proportion of children aged 1–17 years who experienced any physical punishment and/or psychological aggression by caregivers in the past month	C160201
16.2 End abuse, exploitation, trafficking and all forms of violence against and torture of children	16.2.2 Number of victims of human trafficking per 100,000 population, by sex, age and form of exploitation	C160202
16.2 End abuse, exploitation, trafficking and all forms of violence against and torture of children	16.2.3 Proportion of young women and men aged 18–29 years who experienced sexual violence by age 18	C160203
16.3 Promote the rule of law at the national and international levels and ensure equal access to justice for all	16.3.1 Proportion of victims of violence in the previous 12 months who reported their victimization to competent authorities or other officially recognized conflict resolution mechanisms	C160301
16.3 Promote the rule of law at the national and international levels and ensure equal access to justice for all	16.3.2 Unsentenced detainees as a proportion of overall prison population	C160302
16.3 Promote the rule of law at the national and international levels and ensure equal access to justice for all	16.3.3 Proportion of the population who have experienced a dispute in the past two years and who accessed a formal or informal dispute resolution mechanism, by type of mechanism	C160303
16.4 By 2030, significantly reduce illicit financial and arms flows, strengthen the recovery and return of stolen assets and combat all forms of organized crime	16.4.1 Total value of inward and outward illicit financial flows (in current United States dollars)	C160401
16.4 By 2030, significantly reduce illicit financial and arms flows, strengthen the recovery and return of stolen assets and combat all forms of organized crime	16.4.2 Proportion of seized, found or surrendered arms whose illicit origin or context has been traced or established by a competent authority in line with international instruments	C160402
16.5 Substantially reduce corruption and bribery in all their forms	16.5.1 Proportion of persons who had at least one contact with a public official and who paid a bribe to a public official, or were asked for a bribe by those public officials, during the previous 12 months	C160501
16.5 Substantially reduce corruption and bribery in all their forms	16.5.2 Proportion of businesses that had at least one contact with a public official and that paid a bribe to a public official, or were asked for a bribe by those public officials during the previous 12 months	C160502
16.6 Develop effective, accountable and transparent institutions at all levels	16.6.1 Primary government expenditures as a proportion of original approved budget, by sector (or by budget codes or similar)	C160601
16.6 Develop effective, accountable and transparent institutions at all levels	16.6.2 Proportion of population satisfied with their last experience of public services	C160602
16.7 Ensure responsive, inclusive, participatory and representative decision-making at all levels	16.7.1 Proportions of positions in national and local institutions, including (a) the legislatures; (b) the public service; and (c) the judiciary, compared to national distributions, by sex, age, persons with disabilities and population groups	C160701
16.7 Ensure responsive, inclusive, participatory and representative decision-making at all levels	16.7.2 Proportion of population who believe decision-making is inclusive and responsive, by sex, age, disability and population group	C160702
16.8 Broaden and strengthen the participation of developing countries in the institutions of global governance	16.8.1 Proportion of members and voting rights of developing countries in international organizations	C200205
16.9 By 2030, provide legal identity for all, including birth registration	16.9.1 Proportion of children under 5 years of age whose births have been registered with a civil authority, by age	C160901
16.10 Ensure public access to information and protect fundamental freedoms, in accordance with national legislation and international agreements	16.10.1 Number of verified cases of killing, kidnapping, enforced disappearance, arbitrary detention and torture of journalists, associated media personnel, trade unionists and human rights advocates in the previous 12 months	C161001
16.10 Ensure public access to information and protect fundamental freedoms, in accordance with national legislation and international agreements	16.10.2 Number of countries that adopt and implement constitutional, statutory and/or policy guarantees for public access to information	C161002
16.a Strengthen relevant national institutions, including through international cooperation, for building capacity at all levels, in particular in developing countries, to prevent violence and combat terrorism and crime	16.a.1 Existence of independent national human rights institutions in compliance with the Paris Principles	C160a01
16.b Promote and enforce non-discriminatory laws and policies for sustainable development	16.b.1 Proportion of population reporting having personally felt discriminated against or harassed in the previous 12 months on the basis of a ground of discrimination prohibited under international human rights law	C200204

=== Goal 17: Strengthen the means of implementation and revitalize the Global Partnership for Sustainable Development ===

Targets (from the 2030 Agenda for Sustainable Development)	Indicators (versions from March 2020)	UNSD Indicator Codes (Note: Indicator codes were developed by UNSD for data transfer, tracking and other statistical purposes.)
Finance		
17.1 Strengthen domestic resource mobilization, including through international support to developing countries, to improve domestic capacity for tax and other revenue collection	17.1.1 Total government revenue as a proportion of GDP, by source	C170101
17.1 Strengthen domestic resource mobilization, including through international support to developing countries, to improve domestic capacity for tax and other revenue collection	17.1.2 Proportion of domestic budget funded by domestic taxes	C170102
17.2 Developed countries to implement fully their official development assistance commitments, including the commitment by many developed countries to achieve the target of 0.7 per cent of gross national income for official development assistance (ODA/GNI) to developing countries and 0.15 to 0.20 per cent of ODA/GNI to least developed countries; ODA providers are encouraged to consider setting a target to provide at least 0.20 per cent of ODA/GNI to least developed countries	17.2.1 Net official development assistance, total and to least developed countries, as a proportion of the Organization for Economic Cooperation and Development (OECD) Development Assistance Committee donors’ gross national income (GNI)	C170201
17.3 Mobilize additional financial resources for developing countries from multiple sources	17.3.1 Foreign direct investment, official development assistance and South-South cooperation as a proportion of gross national income	C170303
17.3 Mobilize additional financial resources for developing countries from multiple sources	17.3.2 Volume of remittances (in United States dollars) as a proportion of total GDP	C170302
17.4 Assist developing countries in attaining long-term debt sustainability through coordinated policies aimed at fostering debt financing, debt relief and debt restructuring, as appropriate, and address the external debt of highly indebted poor countries to reduce debt distress	17.4.1 Debt service as a proportion of exports of goods and services	C170401
17.5 Adopt and implement investment promotion regimes for least developed countries	17.5.1 Number of countries that adopt and implement investment promotion regimes for developing countries, including the least developed countries	C170502
Technology		
17.6 Enhance North-South, South-South and triangular regional and international cooperation on and access to science, technology and innovation and enhance knowledge-sharing on mutually agreed terms, including through improved coordination among existing mechanisms, in particular at the United Nations level, and through a global technology facilitation mechanism	17.6.1 Fixed Internet broadband subscriptions per 100 inhabitants, by speed (Note: The current indicator 17.6.1 was previously listed as 17.6.2.)	C170602
17.7 Promote the development, transfer, dissemination and diffusion of environmentally sound technologies to developing countries on favourable terms, including on concessional and preferential terms, as mutually agreed	17.7.1 Total amount of funding for developing countries to promote the development, transfer, dissemination and diffusion of environmentally sound technologies	C170701
17.8 Fully operationalize the technology bank and science, technology and innovation capacity-building mechanism for least developed countries by 2017 and enhance the use of enabling technology, in particular information and communications technology	17.8.1 Proportion of individuals using the Internet	C170801
Capacity-building		
17.9 Enhance international support for implementing effective and targeted capacity-building in developing countries to support national plans to implement all the Sustainable Development Goals, including through north–south, South-South and triangular cooperation	17.9.1 Dollar value of financial and technical assistance (including through north–south, South‑South and triangular cooperation) committed to developing countries	C170901
Trade		
17.10 Promote a universal, rules-based, open, non‑discriminatory and equitable multilateral trading system under the World Trade Organization, including through the conclusion of negotiations under its Doha Development Agenda	17.10.1 Worldwide weighted tariff-average	C171001
17.11 Significantly increase the exports of developing countries, in particular with a view to doubling the least developed countries’ share of global exports by 2020	17.11.1 Developing countries’ and least developed countries’ share of global exports	C171101
17.12 Realize timely implementation of duty-free and quota-free market access on a lasting basis for all least developed countries, consistent with World Trade Organization decisions, including by ensuring that preferential rules of origin applicable to imports from least developed countries are transparent and simple, and contribute to facilitating market access	17.12.1 Weighted average tariffs faced by developing countries, least developed countries and small island developing States	C171201
Systemic issues		
Policy and institutional coherence		
17.13 Enhance global macroeconomic stability, including through policy coordination and policy coherence	17.13.1 Macroeconomic Dashboard	C171301
17.14 Enhance policy coherence for sustainable development	17.14.1 Number of countries with mechanisms in place to enhance policy coherence of sustainable development	C171401
17.15 Respect each country's policy space and leadership to establish and implement policies for poverty eradication and sustainable development	17.15.1 Extent of use of country-owned results frameworks and planning tools by providers of development cooperation	C171501
Multi-stakeholder partnerships		
17.16 Enhance the Global Partnership for Sustainable Development, complemented by multi-stakeholder partnerships that mobilize and share knowledge, expertise, technology and financial resources, to support the achievement of the Sustainable Development Goals in all countries, in particular developing countries	17.16.1 Number of countries reporting progress in multi-stakeholder development effectiveness monitoring frameworks that support the achievement of the sustainable development goals	C171601
17.17 Encourage and promote effective public, public-private and civil society partnerships, building on the experience and resourcing strategies of partnerships	17.17.1 Amount in United States dollars committed to public-private partnerships for infrastructure	C171702
Data, monitoring and accountability		
17.18 By 2020, enhance capacity-building support to developing countries, including for least developed countries and small island developing States, to increase significantly the availability of high-quality, timely and reliable data disaggregated by income, gender, age, race, ethnicity, migratory status, disability, geographic location and other characteristics relevant in national contexts	17.18.1 Statistical capacity indicator for Sustainable Development Goal monitoring	C171804
17.18 By 2020, enhance capacity-building support to developing countries, including for least developed countries and small island developing States, to increase significantly the availability of high-quality, timely and reliable data disaggregated by income, gender, age, race, ethnicity, migratory status, disability, geographic location and other characteristics relevant in national contexts	17.18.2 Number of countries that have national statistical legislation that complies with the Fundamental Principles of Official Statistics	C171802
17.18 By 2020, enhance capacity-building support to developing countries, including for least developed countries and small island developing States, to increase significantly the availability of high-quality, timely and reliable data disaggregated by income, gender, age, race, ethnicity, migratory status, disability, geographic location and other characteristics relevant in national contexts	17.18.3 Number of countries with a national statistical plan that is fully funded and under implementation, by source of funding	C171803
17.19 By 2030, build on existing initiatives to develop measurements of progress on sustainable development that complement gross domestic product, and support statistical capacity-building in developing countries	17.19.1 Dollar value of all resources made available to strengthen statistical capacity in developing countries	C171901
17.19 By 2030, build on existing initiatives to develop measurements of progress on sustainable development that complement gross domestic product, and support statistical capacity-building in developing countries	17.19.2 Proportion of countries that (a) have conducted at least one population and housing census in the last 10 years; and (b) have achieved 100 per cent birth registration and 80 per cent death registration	C171902
2 The Gini Coefficient will be reported as a second series in the database, as it is a component of this indicator.

== Repeat indicators ==
Indicators in the global indicator framework that repeat are the following:

- 7.b.1/12.a.1
- 8.4.1/12.2.1
- 8.4.2/12.2.2
- 10.3.1/16.b.1
- 10.6.1/16.8.1
- 13.2.1/13.b.1 (with a slight amendment)
- 15.7.1/15.c.1
- 15.a.1/15.b.1
- 1.5.1/11.5.1/13.1.1
- 1.5.3/11.b.1/13.1.2
- 1.5.4/11.b.2/13.1.3
- 4.7.1/12.8.1/13.3.1
