= Papanek =

Papanek is a surname of Austrian origin. Notable people with the surname include:

- Ernst Papanek (1900–1973), Austrian American educational psychologist
  - Gustav Fritz Papanek (1926–2022), Austrian American development economist, son of Ernst Papanek
    - Hanna Papanek (1927–2017), German-American anthropologist, wife of Gustav Fritz Papanek
- Victor Papanek (1923–1998), Austrian-born American designer and educator
