= Type II Partnerships =

Type II partnerships were developed at the Johannesburg World Summit on Sustainable Development in 2002. Arising in opposition to the state-centred eco-governmentality of previous approaches to sustainable development policy, the partnerships facilitate the inclusion of private and civil actors into the management of sustainable development. The partnerships are employed alongside traditional intergovernmental mechanisms in order to effectively implement the United Nations' Agenda 21 and Millennium Development Goals, particularly at sub-national level. Although widely acknowledged as one of the most innovative and effective developments in global environmental governance in recent years, the partnerships have faced criticism due to fears of a lack of accountability, and the risk that they may exacerbate inequalities of power between Northern and Southern states. Despite these reservations, there is a general consensus among state and non-governmental actors that Type II partnerships are a significantly progressive step in global environmental governance in general, and sustainable development discourse in particular.

== Background and development ==
First proposed at the Johannesburg World Summit on Sustainable Development in 2002, Type II partnerships are characterised by collaborations between national or sub-national governments, private sector actors and civil society actors, who form voluntary transnational agreements in order to meet specific Sustainable Development Goals. The Johannesburg negotiations also produced so-called Type I outcomes referred to under the umbrella of a Global Deal, a series of legally binding intergovernmental commitments designed to aid states in the implementation of sustainable development goals. However, during the discussions preceding the summit, a growing consensus emerged among the actors involved that traditional intergovernmental relations were no longer sufficient in the management of sustainable development, and consequently the talks began to incorporate suggestions for increasingly decentralised and participatory approaches. Considered to be one of the most innovative and celebrated outcomes of the 2002 summit, the partnerships were created as a means by which to further implement the sustainable development goals set out in the Agenda 21 action plan, particularly those objectives aimed at the local and regional level, as traditional Type I intergovernmental strategies were deemed unlikely to effectively achieve lower level implementation of the Agenda 21 plan.

The Johannesburg negotiations concluded that Type II partnerships must meet seven key criteria: i) they should be voluntary and based on shared responsibility, ii) they must complement, rather than substitute, intergovernmental sustainable development strategies, and must meet the agreed outcomes of the Johannesburg summit, iii) they must consist of a range of multi-level stakeholders, preferably within a given area of work, iv) they must ensure transparency and accountability, v) they must produce tangible results, vi) the partnership must be new, and adequate funding must be available, and vii) a follow-up process must be developed. If these requirements were successfully fulfilled, it was hoped that Type II partnerships could create a fundamental shift in sustainable development discourse, leading to an increasingly participatory, bottom-up method of governing the issue.

== Implementation and management ==
Following the Johannesburg summit, the United Nations Commission for Sustainable Development was granted responsibility for the management of Type II partnerships as its mandate and focus were considered most appropriate to the supervision of the partnerships. The UNCSD was created following the 1992 Rio summit with the sole mandate of overseeing the implementation of Agenda 21 and the Rio Declaration on Environment and Development, a focus which made the UNCSD highly amenable to the management of Type II agreements. The UNCSD supervises the 300+ Type II partnerships formed as a result of the summit, ensuring that the partnerships continue to implement the sustainable development goals agreed at Johannesburg.

An example of one of the larger partnerships supervised by the UNCSD is the Global Water Partnership, a network of over 2,300 global partners composed of organisations including UN agencies, governments of developed and developing countries, development banks, research institutions, NGOs and private actors. The organisation aims to diffuse information regarding water management to stakeholders at all levels, and assists countries in the development of water management strategies at the local, national and global level, increasing the capacity of developing nations to manage water supplies in the long term.

== Role in environmental governance ==
=== Transition from government to governance ===
“This Summit will be remembered not for the treaties, commitments, or eloquent declarations it produced, but for the first stirrings of a new way of governing the global commons, the beginnings of a shift from the stiff formal waltz of traditional diplomacy to the jazzier dance of improvisational solution oriented partnerships that may include non-government organizations, willing governments and other stakeholders.” World Resources Institute, 2002

The dominance of Type II partnerships as a primary outcome of the Johannesburg summit represented a fundamental shift in the governing of sustainable development; a transition from the top-down, government-centred method favoured by the Brundtland Report and at the 1992 Rio summit, to a collaborative, multi-stakeholder approach which acknowledged the importance of the economic and social expertise of non-governmental actors in sustainable development initiatives. Immediately prior to the summit, then- UN Secretary General Kofi Annan predicted that whilst governments would be responsible for the creation of a common plan of action for sustainable development, the most significant and powerful agents of change to emerge from the Johannesburg negotiations would be Type II partnerships, through which the UN hoped to harness the technological, financial and scientific resources of partners involved in the agreements, reinvigorating the organisation's pursuit of sustainable development.

The UN guidelines for Type II partnerships specified that the agreements should be complementary to, not an alternative to, intergovernmental action plans for sustainable development. As opposed to developing the partnerships as a method of 'governing without government', the agreements were designed to govern alongside traditional government approaches. Rather than treating Type II partnerships as a panacea for sustainable development, it was hoped that such participatory multi-stakeholder governance mechanisms would increase the flexibility and enhance the implementation of sustainable development policy in collaboration with states and international organisations. After the Johannesburg summit, the concept of environmental governance was no longer understood as a legalistic function performed solely by governments, but rather as a collaborative, informal approach to the management of environmental issues, involving both state and non-governmental actors. This new understanding demonstrates that the changing approach to sustainable development which arose from the Johannesburg summit influenced a much wider shift in global environmental governance.

==== Competing rationalities of government ====
Within a Foucauldian context, the Type I and Type II arguments presented in the summit negotiations represent two fundamentally opposing rationalities of government. The interventionist, state-centric approach to sustainable development favoured by advocates of the Global Deal represents a rationality of government which Foucault identified as bio-politics; the application of political power in an attempt to control or modify life processes. Such an approach to the pursuit of sustainable development offers little opportunity for participation by private or civil actors, in direct contrast to the multi-stakeholder premise of Type II partnerships. The eco-governmental, disciplinary ideas conveyed in the Global Deal suggest that the Type I approach typifies the centralised command-and-control method favoured by traditional government, whereas the decentralised, voluntary nature of Type II partnerships demonstrates an advanced liberal governmentality which empowers non-state actors to undertake responsibility for the governing of sustainable development, an approach which is representative of the participatory, multi-stakeholder methods by which governance is characterised. The eventual dominance of Type II partnerships in the outcomes of the Johannesburg summit therefore symbolises a wider shift in the understanding of the purposes, ends and means of government in relation to sustainable development and environmental governance.

However, Mert questions the compatibility of partnerships with the global governance of sustainable development. The partnerships represented a point of intersection between three previously separate political discourses; participatory democracy, private governance, and sustainable development, altering the dynamics of global environmental governance processes. The shift towards voluntary mechanisms as opposed to international regulation could prove problematic as legally binding frameworks are sometimes the most appropriate solution to the governance of environmental problems. A hegemonic approach to sustainable development discourse could demonstrate greater effectiveness in the management of the issue than a fragmented, partnership-driven approach which could lead to inconsistent and conflicting management of such a global issue.

=== Transnational governance networks ===
Type II partnerships exemplify a growing reliance on public-private-civil co-operation in environmental governance. The architects of the summit placed an emphasis on discussions which would encourage the creation of multi-stakeholder partnerships with the objective of fulfilling UN sustainable development goals, acknowledging that traditional intergovernmental agreements were inadequate to sufficiently promote sustainable development. Furthermore, state actors were notoriously unwilling to improve international environmental co-operation prior to the Johannesburg summit, leaving those who sought a positive outcome to the WSSD to search for alternative solutions which incorporated a broader variety of actors. Type II partnerships emerged as the dominant outcome of the Johannesburg summit, highlighting their importance as agents of change in the achievement of sustainable development. The partnerships were considered by advocates to be representative of a new era of environmental governance, characterised by collaborative decision-making and shared responsibility between public, private and civil actors in the management of transnational public issues.

The development of Type II partnerships marked the emergence of a broader phenomenon within environmental governance- the introduction of transnational governance networks in the management of global environmental issues. Transnational governance networks combine actors from the public, private and civil sectors in the pursuit of common practices and ideas. The role of networks of private and civil actors in transboundary communication is not novel to the academic community; however, the emphasis on transnational public-private-civil networks as mechanisms for achieving sustainable development during the Johannesburg negotiations led to recognition of the ability of such networks to integrate private and civil actors into the global environmental governance process.

Transnational governance networks address a number of shortcomings in traditional state-centred approaches to the management of transboundary issues such as sustainable development. They can diffuse information to the public perhaps more effectively than governments or international organisations, particularly when such information requires a degree of technical expertise to deliver, such as the transfer of specialised knowledge from the private sector to industry groups regarding sustainable business practices. They can also facilitate the implementation of global management strategies at the local level, and they may potentially close the participation gap in global environmental governance by involving private and civil actors in decision-making processes.

=== Reframing of sustainable development discourse ===
The Johannesburg summit represented a further shift in the governing of sustainable development; rather than considering environmental issues in isolation, as had previously been common practice within sustainable development policy, the Johannesburg negotiations concluded that a reframing of sustainable development discourse, which re-conceptualised sustainable development as a dynamic interaction between three interdependent pillars- society, environment and economy- was necessary in order to pursue a more holistic ideal of sustainable development. This reframing of sustainable development required Type II partnerships to address a broader concept of sustainable development, and consequently objectives such as poverty alleviation and community involvement feature alongside environmental issues in the objectives of the partnerships.

== Issues ==
=== Imbalances of power ===
Although designed to incorporate a broader range of social, environmental and economic perspectives into the environmental governance process and to facilitate the inclusion of actors from all levels into decision-making, the extent to which imbalances of power between actors involved in the partnerships affects their implementation has provoked concern among their critics.

Brinkerhoff and Brinkerhoff theorised that an effective partnership must fulfil two essential criteria: mutuality- interdependence and equality between partners, and organisational identity- the equal maintenance of each partner’s missions and goals. In the event of a partnership between Northern and Southern actors, for example, the North will inevitably contribute greater financial and material resources to the partnership than the South, creating a power inequality which may enable the North to assume control of the partnership and impairing the mutuality necessary for the partnership to function successfully. This concern was reflected by a number of developing nations who formed a coalition to lobby against the development of Type II partnerships, fearing that the partnerships would award too much authority over sustainable development to the global North, whilst simultaneously reducing the responsibility of industrialised nations to develop and implement legally binding intergovernmental management strategies.

In order to maintain mutuality, it is therefore essential that the definition of a contribution within Type II partnerships is extended beyond financial and material resources, and includes knowledge, skills and other relevant strengths which can be incorporated to redress the balance of power within the partnership.

=== Accountability ===
Critics of Type II partnerships have expressed concern that the initiative is simply a means by which to deflect accountability for sustainable development management from states and international organisations. The United States, a nation infamously opposed to state-led environmental governance as evidenced by their withdrawal from the Kyoto Protocol, strongly supported the development of Type II partnerships whilst continuing to oppose Type I outcomes, leading to concern that some nations may view Type II partnerships as an opportunity to deflect attention from a lack of state-level progress in the management of sustainable development. An emphasis on Type II partnerships, it is argued, could therefore be exploited by nations who wish to avoid accountability for the management of sustainable development and environmental issues, transferring responsibility for such issues to private actors who are less accountable to the needs of those affected by the problem in question.

The ensuring of accountability and transparency is a key criterion of Type II partnerships; however, the diverse multi-stakeholder composition of the partnerships negates the use of traditional accountability methods, such as the introduction of a centralised authority charged with maintaining the accountability of the partners involved in Type II agreements. Bäckstrand suggests that a pluralistic system of accountability, incorporating market and reputational accountability measures such as financial sanctions and naming and shaming, could improve the accountability of the actors involved in Type II partnerships by providing more flexible methods of ensuring accountability which can be adapted to the nature of the actor in question.

== Discussion ==
The Type II partnerships developed at the Johannesburg summit demonstrated a paradigm-shifting impact upon sustainable development discourse and the conceptualisation of global environmental governance. By addressing the limitations of the state-centric, top-down method which typified environmental governance prior to Johannesburg and facilitating the participation of private and civil actors in the governing of sustainable development, the partnerships became emblematic of the transition from command-and-control government to the informal, participatory governance mechanisms by which global environmental governance is now classified. Furthermore, the partnerships exemplify the use of transnational governance networks as a mechanism by which to implement environmental policy at local and regional level. Such factors led the World Resources Institute to declare the partnerships representative of a ‘new era’ of environmental governance.

However, considering the flaws inherent in the partnerships, it is crucial that advocates of the agreements resist the temptation to consider them a magic bullet with which every shortcoming of a centralised approach to environmental governance can be addressed. Although advantageous in terms of increased flexibility and effective lower-level implementation of policies, partnerships lack the internal and external accountability of intergovernmental strategies, and may intensify power inequalities between the industrialised North and developing South. The decision of the UN to introduce Type II partnerships as complementary governance mechanism is therefore the most appropriate application of the partnerships, as the dynamic interaction between intergovernmental strategies and voluntary public-private-civil partnerships can potentially produce a far greater positive impact upon global environmental governance than the sum of its parts.
