= Conference on Environment and Development =

Conference on Environment and Development may refer to:

- South African National Conference on Environment and Development, a three-day conference
- United Nations Conference on Environment and Development, a major United Nations conference
