= SEED (organization) =

SEED is a global partnership for action on sustainable development and the green economy. It was initiated in 2001 by the German Federal Ministry for the Environment, Nature Conservation, Building and Nuclear Safety (BMUB). Under the name SEED Initiative it was presented as an “Example of Excellence” partnership inter alia by UNEP and BMUB at the Johannesburg World Summit on Sustainable Development in 2002 where it was also registered by the United Nations Environment Programme (UNEP), the United Nations Development Programme (UNDP), and the International Union for Conservation of Nature (IUCN) as a Type II Partnership. SEED was originally conceived as an acronym for Supporting Entrepreneurs for Environment and Development.

== Programme approach, goals and objectives ==
SEED works for social and environmental entrepreneurship in two ways:

- through direct support to enterprises, particularly those in the start-up phase, to scale up or replicate their activities in a way that helps local economies or communities while promoting the sustainable management of natural resources, enhancing ecosystems and reducing poverty.
- promoting a more enabling framework by providing to national and international policy makers the results of research into the impacts of, and barriers and enablers faced by, social and environmental enterprises; and convening symposia in Africa to bring together practitioners at the grassroots with a wide range of policy makers.

SEED is also a member of the Green Economy Coalition (GEC), which includes a range of organisations and sectors from NGOs, institutes, businesses and trade unions.

== The SEED Awards Program ==
The SEED Awards for Entrepreneurship in Sustainable Development is an annual awards scheme designed to find the most promising, innovative and locally-led start-up social and environmental enterprises in countries with developing and emerging economies. The independent SEED International Jury of experts selects enterprises which have the potential to make real improvements in poverty eradication and environmental sustainability while contributing to a greener economy.

In light of the 2011 SEED Awards, Achim Steiner, UN Under-Secretary-General and UNEP Executive Director, described the importance of the SEED Awards in the following manner:

"The SEED Award winners are shining examples of what can be achieved through the lens of the Green Economy and with very little in terms of funds but an extraordinary amount of innovation and hard work. The challenge […] is how to scale-up and accelerate the kinds of transitions that SEED represents. Companies have a lot to gain from partnering with civil society and public sector initiatives in order to catalyze change."

Applications for the SEED Awards are generally open for enterprises in a developing country or country in transition, which is working in partnership with others to generate economic, environmental and social benefits. Eligibility however varies depending on the award type for which an enterprise wants to apply. In many instances start-up social and environmental enterprises need access to knowledge, expertise and networks as much as financial support. SEED meets this need by offering winners a package of individually tailored support in addition to a monetary prize. This package comprises business and technical support, access to expertise and networks, and international profiling to foster sustainable business growth.

In 2015, the SEED Awards had a special focus on Africa, with 25 awards given to enterprises in Ethiopia, Kenya, Malawi, Mozambique, Namibia, South Africa, Tanzania and Uganda.

== History and Growth ==
The first SEED Awards were presented between 2005 and 2008.

On 30 June 2015, after 8 years at the helm of SEED, Dr. Helen Maquard stepped down as executive director. Under her leadership, SEED has evolved from a biennial awards scheme into a multi-component programme for action on sustainable development and the green economy.

== SEED Partners ==
Founding Partners of SEED are United Nations Environment Programme (UNEP), the United Nations Development Programme (UNDP), and the International Union for Conservation of Nature (IUCN). Since April 2013 SEED is hosted by the German Think-and-Do Tank adelphi research gGmbH. Further partners of SEED comprise Conservation International, the European Union, the German Federal Ministry for the Environment, Nature Conservation, Building and Nuclear Safety, the Government of Flanders, the Indian Ministry of Environment and Forests, the Ministry of Economic Affairs of the Netherlands, South Africa's Department of Environmental Affairs, the United Nations Industrial Development Organization (UNIDO), the United Nations Entity for Gender Equality and the Empowerment of Women UN Women (UN Women), the US Department of State and the international Law firm Hogan Lovells.

In 2011 Hisense International Co. became SEED’S Corporate partner when they entered into a partnership agreement with UNEP to promote and strengthen the brand profile and global positioning of the SEED Awards; committing to a three-year commitment 2011-2013. In 2013 the agreement was extended for an additional three years.
