= High-level Political Forum on Sustainable Development =

United Nations High-level Political Forum on Sustainable Development
- Abbreviation: HLPF
- Formation: 9 July 2013; 13 years ago
- Type: Intergovernmental organization, Regulatory body, Advisory board
- Legal status: Active
- Headquarters: New York, USA
- Parent organization: United Nations Economic and Social Council; United Nations General Assembly
- Website: HLPF on sustainabledevelopment.un.org

The United Nations High-level Political Forum on Sustainable Development (HLPF), a subdivision of both the United Nations General Assembly and the United Nations Economic and Social Council, is responsible for the entire organization's policy on sustainable development.

It adopts negotiated declarations, reviews commitment and the progress of the 2030 Agenda for Sustainable Development (the 17 Sustainable Development Goals, SDGs or Global Goals).

The Forum replaced the Commission on Sustainable Development on the 24 September 2013. Meetings of the Forum are open to all Member States of the United Nations.

== Mandate and tasks ==
As the Forum is held under the authority of both the Economic and Social Council and the General Assembly, the body hosts two different types of meetings:

- While under the auspices of the General Assembly: Once every four years at the level of Heads of State and Government for a period of two days.
- While under the auspices of the Economic and Social Council: Yearly, for a period of eight days, including a three-day ministerial segment.

The HLPF was created with the aim to strengthen sustainable development governance at the United Nations. It works to achieve this through its mandate, which states the following in respect of sustainable development:

Resolution A/RES/66/288:
- (a) Provide political leadership, guidance and recommendations for sustainable development;
- (b) Enhance integration of the three dimensions of sustainable development...at all levels;
- (c) Provide a dynamic platform for regular dialogue...to advance sustainable development;
- (d) Ensuring the appropriate consideration of new and emerging sustainable development challenges;
- (e) Follow up and review progress in the implementation of previous United Nations sustainable development commitments;
- (g) Improve cooperation and coordination within the United Nations system on sustainable development programmes and policies;
- (i) Promote the sharing of best practices and experiences relating to the implementation of sustainable development;
- (j) Promote system-wide coherence and coordination of sustainable development policies;

Resolution A/RES/67/290:
- (a) Provide political leadership, guidance and recommendations for sustainable development,
- (b) Follow up and review progress in the implementation of sustainable development commitments,
- (c) Enhance the integration of the three dimensions of sustainable development in a holistic and cross-sectoral manner at all levels;
- (d) Ensure the appropriate consideration of new and emerging sustainable development challenges;
- (e) Devote adequate time to the discussion of the sustainable development challenges facing developing countries;

=== Sustainable Development Commitments Review ===
The Forum is responsible for the follow up and the review of progress of implementation of the following sustainable development commitments:

- Agenda 21
- Johannesburg Plan of Implementation
- Barbados Programme of Action
- Mauritius Strategy
- Rio+20
- LDC-IV

As well as the relevant outcomes of other United Nations summits and conferences.

== Meeting themes ==
Every year since 2013, the HLPF has held a session. The meetings are held in July. Due to the COVID-19 pandemic, the forum took place virtually in 2020 for the first time.

Year	Auspices	Dates	Theme	Ref
2024	ECOSOC	8-17 July	"Reinforcing the 2030 Agenda and eradicating poverty in times of multiple crises: the effective delivery of sustainable, resilient and innovative solutions"	
2023	ECOSOC	10-19 July	"Accelerating the recovery from the coronavirus disease (COVID-19) and the full implementation of the 2030 Agenda for Sustainable Development at all levels"	
2022	ECOSOC	5-15 July	"Building back better from the coronavirus disease (COVID-19) while advancing the full implementation of the 2030 Agenda for Sustainable Development"	
2021	ECOSOC	6-15 July	"Sustainable and resilient recovery from the COVID-19 pandemic that promotes the economic, social and environmental dimensions of sustainable development: building an inclusive and effective path for the achievement of the 2030 Agenda in the context of the decade of action and delivery for sustainable development"	
2020	ECOSOC	7-16 July	"Accelerated action and transformative pathways: realizing the decade of action and delivery for sustainable development" (due to the COVID-19 pandemic, the forum took place virtually in 2020 for the first time).	
2019	GA	24 Sep – 25 Sep	SDG Summit	
2019	ECOSOC	9 Jul – 18 Jul	Empowering people and ensuring inclusiveness and equality	
2018	ECOSOC	9 Jul – 18 Jul	"Transformation towards sustainable and resilient societies" The forum focused on six of the 17 goals: SDG 6, SDG 7, SDG 11, SDG 12, SDG 15 and SDG 17	
2017	ECOSOC	10 Jul – 19 Jul	Eradicating poverty and promoting prosperity in a changing world	
2016	ECOSOC	11 Jul - 20 Jul	Ensuring that no one is left behind	
2015	ECOSOC	26 Jun – 8 Jul	Strengthening integration, implementation and review - the HLPF after 2015	
2014	ECOSOC	30 Jun - 9 Jul	Achieving the MDGs and charting the way for an ambitious post-2015 development agenda, including the SDGs	
2013	GA	24 Sep	Building the future we want: from Rio+20 to the post-2015 development agenda	

== History ==
The HLPF has its origin in the Commission on Sustainable Development (CSD), which was created in 1992 to ensure follow-up of the Conference on Environment and Development (UNCED). This Commission met a total of 20 times, with its last session on 20 September 2013.

At the 2012 Conference on Sustainable Development, or Rio+20, it was decided that the Commission would be replaced by the High-Level Political Forum on Sustainable Development. This new Forum would meet under the auspices of both the Economic and Social Council, as well as the General Assembly. The Forum was formally created by Resolution 67/290 on 9 July 2013.

== See also ==
- Earth Summit
  - Rio Declaration on Environment and Development
- Durban III The conference opened on 22 September 2011
- Planetary boundaries
