= Hanna Papanek =

American anthropologist

- Born: Hanna Kaiser; January 24, 1927; Berlin, Germany
- Died: December 16, 2017 (aged 90); Lexington, Massachusetts, U.S.
- Occupations: Feminist scholar, anthropologist
- Spouse: Gustav Fritz Papanek
- Relatives: Ernst Papanek (father-in-law)

Hanna Kaiser Papanek (January 24, 1927 – December 16, 2017) was a German-born American feminist scholar. She made extended anthropological studies of women's lives in Pakistan in the 1950s and in Indonesia in the 1970s.

== Early life and education ==
Papanek was born in Berlin, the daughter of Alexander Stein and Eleanor Kaiser. Her parents were Jewish; her father was born in Latvia. Her family fled Germany with the rise of the Third Reich, moving first to Czechoslovakia and next to France. She moved to the United States in December 1940, as a child refugee on the SS Nyassa. She graduated from Hunter College High School and Brooklyn College. She earned a Ph.D. in social relations from Harvard University.

== Career ==
Papanek was a "trailing spouse", an economic position she wrote about in 1973, as an element of the "two-person career". She held teaching and research positions at Harvard, Boston University, the University of California, Berkeley, and the University of Indonesia. She gave an interview for the documentary They Were Not Silent (1998).

== Publications ==
Papanek's academic writing appeared in journals including Signs, Human Organization, Journal of Marriage and Family, Economic Development and Cultural Change, Comparative Studies in Society and History, American Journal of Sociology, Studies in Family Planning, Women & Politics, Comparative Education Review, Journal of Asian Studies, Economic and Political Weekly, and Indian Journal of Gender Studies. In addition to her scholarship, Papanek wrote an afterword for a 1988 edition of The Sultana's Dream, a 1905 feminist utopia written by Rokeya Sakhawat Hossain. She also wrote a German-language memoir about her parents, Elly und Alexander.

- "The Woman Field Worker in a Purdah Society" (1964)
- "Purdah in Pakistan: Seclusion and Modern Occupations for Women" (1971)
- "Pakistan's Big Businessmen: Muslim Separatism, Entrepreneurship, and Partial Modernization" (1972)
- "Purdah: Separate Worlds and Symbolic Shelter" (1973)
- "Men, Women, and Work: Reflections on the Two-Person Career" (1973)
- "The Work of Women: Postscript from Mexico City" (1975)
- "Women in South and Southeast Asia: Issues and Research" (1975)
- "Development Planning for Women" (1977)
- Women and Development: Perspectives from South and South-East Asia (1979, co-edited with Rounaq Jahan)
- "Family Status Production: The "Work" and "Non-Work" of Women" (1979)
- "Research on Women by Women: Interviewer Selection and Training in Indonesia" (1979)
- Separate Worlds: Studies of Purdah in South Asia (1982, co-edited with Gail Minault)
- "Implications of Development for Women in Indonesia: Research and Policy Issues" (1982)
- "Class and Gender in Education-Employment Linkages" (1985)
- "False Specialization and the Purdah of Scholarship: A Review Article" (1984)
- "Women Are Good with Money: Earning and Managing in an Indonesian City" (1988, with Laurel Schwede)
- "Vignettes from Life of an Asian Socialist Intellectual" (1990, with Goenawan Muhamad)
- "The Ideal Woman and the Ideal Society: Control and Autonomy in the Construction of Identity" (1994)
- "Notes from a Chosen Exile" (1998)

== Personal life ==
Hanna Kaiser married economist Gustav Fritz Papanek in 1947. They had a son, Tom, and a daughter, Joanne. She was naturalized as a United States citizen in 1949. She died in 2017, at the age of 90, in Lexington, Massachusetts. She donated her books and papers to the International Information Centre and Archives for the Women's Movement (ATRIA). Thousands of her photographic slides are in the Special Collections Research Center of the University of Chicago.
