= Cape Town Ecology Group =

South Africa–based radical environmental group

The Cape Town Ecology Group was a South Africa-based radical environmental group, founded in 1987, as a "child of Koeberg Alert", and active until the early 1990s. It espoused a more political-oriented green ideology as opposed to the apartheid-based conservation groups of the time. According to founder Mike Cope: "We felt the need to view ecological issues on a broader level and recognised the connection between politics and ecology. Ecology is definitely a political issue because environmental issues are about where we live."

It co-hosted South Africa's first conference on the environment, in conjunction with the Western Cape Branch of the World Conference on Religion and Peace and the Call of Islam in 1991. The National Conference on Environment and Development was held at the University of the Western Cape and some 231 representatives from a wide range of organisations discussed the links between environmental degradation and the political situation in Southern Africa. The three-day conference aimed to "Ecologise Politics, Politicise Ecology" and was considered a breakthrough for its time.

According to conference organiser, Phakamile Tshazibane: "For the first time groups such as the Congress of South African Trade Unions (Cosatu), the National Council of Trade Unions (Nactu), the Pan Africanist Congress (PAC) and the African National Congress (ANC), found common ground around the issue of the environment."

== Founders ==
- Michael Cope (author, anarchist and son of Jack Cope)
- Julia Martin (author, academic, active member of the Steering Committee for seven years)
- Karen Rolfes (tobacco heiress)
- Henri Laurie (mathematician)
- Donna Metzlar (activist)
- George Petros (activist)

== See also ==
- Earthlife Africa
- Earth Summit 2002
- Green movement in South Africa
- Koeberg Alert
