= Rounaq Jahan =

Bangladeshi political scientist, academic, and author

- রওনক জাহান
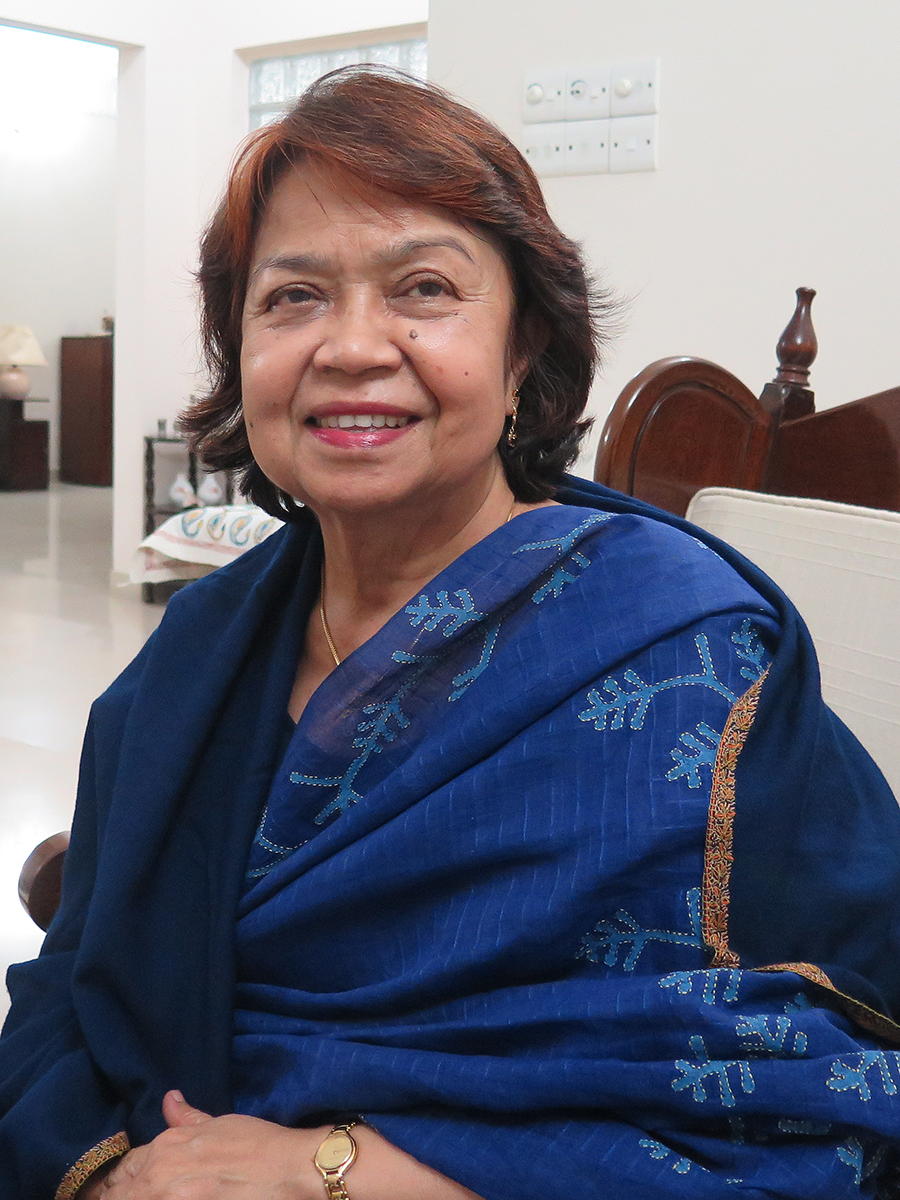
- Dr. Rounaq Jahan
- Born: 2 March 1944 (age 82)
- Occupations: Political scientist; Educator; Author
- Years active: 1970–present
- Spouse: Rehman Sobhan (after 2003)
- Awards: Radcliffe Award

Academic background
- Education: PhD (political science)
- Alma mater: University of Dhaka; Harvard University
- Thesis: Pakistan: Failure in National Integration (1970)
- Influences: Abdur Razzaq

Academic work
- Discipline: Political science
- Sub-discipline: Comparative politics, Political theory, Development studies, Gender and development, Feminist theory
- Institutions: University of Dhaka (1970–1993); Columbia University (1990–present)
- Main interests: Gender and development, governance, health, politics of Bangladesh
- Notable works: Pakistan: Failure in National Integration; Women and Development: Perspectives from South and South-East Asia; Bangladesh: Promise and Performance

Rounaq Jahan (Bengali: রওনক জাহান; born 2 March 1944) is a Bangladeshi political scientist, feminist leader and author. A former faculty of the University of Dhaka, Jahan teaches and researches at the Columbia University since 1990. She was a representative of Bangladesh to the 32nd Session of the United Nations General Assembly in 1977. She founded Women for Women, one of the first feminist research centres in Bangladesh, in 1973, and is the director of Research Initiatives Bangladesh (RIB).

== Early life ==
Jahan received her MA in political science from University of Dhaka in 1963 and from Harvard University in 1968. She earned her PhD from Harvard University in 1970.

== Career ==
Jahan joined the University of Dhaka in 1970, where she taught undergraduate and graduate courses on comparative politics, political development, and research methodology. She also supervised MPhil and PhD theses till she left the university in 1993. From 1973 to 1975 she was the chairperson of the Department of Political Science of the university. She had been a research fellow at the Chr. Michelsen Institute, Bergen, Norway in 1979; a research fellow at the Department of Political Science and Committee on South Asia, University of Chicago in 1975–76; a visiting fellow at the Committee on South Asia, University of Chicago in 1980; a senior research associate at the Center for Asian Development Studies, Boston University in 1978; and a research associate at the Center for International Affairs and the John F. Kennedy School of Government, Harvard University from 1971 to 1972.

During her tenure at Dhaka University Jahan served several policymaking bodies established by the Government of Bangladesh in an advisory capacity in the fields of education, culture, rural development, women, and population. She had also served as a consultant to United Nations Development Programme (UNDP), United Nations Population Fund (UNFPA), United Nations Development Fund for Women (UNIFEM), United Nations Children's Fund (UNICEF), United Nations Capital Development Fund (UNCDF), Swedish International Development Cooperation Agency (SIDA), Norwegian Agency for Development Cooperation (NORAD), United States Agency for International Development (USAID), Organisation for Economic Co-operation and Development (OECD), the Ford Foundation, the Rockefeller Foundation, as well as NGOs like International Women's Health Coalition.

Jahan was the head of the Programme on Rural Women, Employment and Development Department at the International Labour Organization (ILO) in Geneva, Switzerland from 1985 to 1989. She was the coordinator of the Programme on Integration of Women in Development, United Nations Asia Pacific Development Centre (APDC) in Kuala Lumpur, Malaysia for two years. She was a member of the advisory board of Human Rights Watch in New York, the board of trustees of the Population Council, the international council of the Asia Society, and the advisory committee on rural development at the ILO.

Since 1990, Jahan is working as a senior research scholar at the Southern Asian Institute, Columbia University and an adjunct professor of international affairs at School of International and Public Affairs of the university. There she has taught for the graduate courses on Women and Development: Key Policy Issues (1991–95), Gender, Politics and Development (1998), and Arsenic Crisis in Bangladesh (2000).

== Bibliography ==
Most of Jahan's research is on gender and development, governance, health, and politics of Bangladesh. She is also a prolific author of articles published in edited books, academic journals, magazines and newspapers. Her notable books include:

- Bangladesh: Promise and Performance (edited, Zed Books, 2000)
- The Elusive Agenda: Mainstreaming Women in Development (St. Martin's Press, 1995)
- Bangladesh Politics: Problems and Issues (University Press, 1980)
- Women and Development: Perspectives from South and South-East Asia (coedited with Hanna Papanek, Bangladesh Institute of Law and International Affairs, 1979)
- Pakistan: Failure in National Integration (Columbia, 1972).
