= Patricia Chaves =

Patricia Chaves is a Senior Sustainable Development Officer and the Head of the Partnerships Team at the United Nations Division for Sustainable Development.

A career foreign service officer of the government of Costa Rica since 1994, she served as Minister Counsellor of the Mission of Costa Rica to the United Nations from 1994 to 1998 and from 2000 to 2003. In that capacity, she was the principal negotiator for Costa Rica in meetings related to environment, finance, forests, macroeconomics and sustainable development. During 1996, when Costa Rica chaired the Group of 77 (G77) and China, she was that group's senior negotiator on economic and environment issues. In 2002, she was the leading Costa Rican negotiator at World Summit on Sustainable Development. During 1999, she was the Co-Director of the Costa Rica-Canada Initiative on Forests.

She has a master's degree in Government with a focus on Economic Policy from Lehigh University.
