= Trailing spouse =

Someone who moves to follow a romantic partner

The term trailing spouse is used to describe a person who follows their life partner to another city because of a work assignment. The term is often associated with people involved in an expatriate assignment but is also used by academia on domestic assignments. Other terms may include expat partner, military dependent, and accompanying spouse.

The earliest citation of the term trailing spouse is attributed to Mary Bralove in a Wall Street Journal article in 1981 titled "Problems of Two-Career Families Start Forcing Businesses to Adapt."

Another personnel man remembers the promising executive he lost because her husband was a dentist who couldn't find a good practice to join in the area. To cope with this problem, some 150 northern New Jersey employers participate in an employer job bank. The bank is designed to provide job leads for "the trailing spouse" of a newly hired or transferred executive.

Trailing spouses are a common phenomenon among military and foreign service households, as well as in private sector companies with employees in different cities, states, and countries. As the conditions of employment require a geographic relocation, the employee's spouse is faced with a major transition that includes personal and professional challenges.

== Trailing spouse in economics and sociology ==
In economics, trailing spouses have been traditionally called tied movers. The term tied mover was coined by Mincer (1978) and it refers to a family migrant who, if single, would not have chosen to migrate. On the other hand, tied stayer is a family non-migrant who, if single, would have chosen to migrate. The issue of family migration decision-making in economics was first approached by Sandell (1977), Mincer (1978) and Polachek and Horvath (1977). These authors recognized that even if the family ’gains’ from migration, on an individual level some family members might ’lose’ from moving. Using a unitary conceptualization of the household, these models predicted that the spouse with a more discontinuous labour force participation and less market earning power (e.g. motherhood, non-market activities) has smaller gains from migration and hence is more likely to be a tied mover.

Anthropologist Hanna Papanek, herself a trailing spouse to economist Gustav Fritz Papanek, addressed many of these issues in "Men, Women, and Work: Reflections on the Two-Person Career" (1973). In sociology, Lichter (1983) emphasized the importance of martial power while Shihadeh (1991) and Bielby and Bielby (1992) argued that gender roles also weighted in the family decision to migrate. According to these last authors, women were more likely to be tied movers or trailing spouses not because of their lower human capital but because of their prescribed role within societies. Some empirical studies in economics have later allowed for gender asymmetric migration by assigning a lower weight to the returns of the wife in the Mincer model (Foged, 2016., Krieger, 2019.)

== Issues ==
- Professional sacrifice – It is not uncommon for a trailing spouse to sacrifice their professional / career goals during their trailing period.
- Family issues – Stresses caused by social, financial and cultural strains placed on the family relationships as a result of the assignment.
- Barriers to mobility – The willingness or otherwise of the trailing spouse or other family members to relocate; lack of support by the sponsoring employer to address the needs of the trailing spouse.
- Work/life challenges – Difficulties associated with finding and maintaining meaningful work or other sense of worth while on assignments, prompting a need to consider career transitions, develop professional resilience and embrace opportunities for reinvention.
- Loss of identity – Difficulties associated with loss of identity and the subsequent period of reshaping and remodelling that ensues in the new environment.
- Gender – Experiences and issues facing male trailing spouses vary from those faced by females.

== Notable examples ==
- Julia Child
- Hillary Clinton
- Ruth Bader Ginsburg
- Brigid Keenan
- Sarah Macdonald
- P. K. Mahanandia
- Michelle Obama
- Alan Paul
- Prince Albert of Saxe-Coburg and Gotha
- Catherine the Great
- Doug Emhoff
- Chasten Buttigieg
