= Aquaculture in the Marshall Islands =

Aquaculture in the Marshall Islands is governed by the Marshall Islands Marine Resources Authority. A hatchery for giant clams has been established by the national government in Likiep Atoll, and at least one other clam farm is in operation in Mili Atoll. At the CSD-16 Partnerships Fair in 2008, Erik Hagberg suggested that Holothuroidea cultivation is a viable option for developing aquaculture in the country.
