= Global Water Partnership =

- Type: Intergovernmental organisation
- Purpose: Water management
- Location: Stockholm, Sweden
- Region served: Worldwide
- Key people: Executive Secretary and CEO, Darío Soto-Abril Chair Howard Bamsey Technical Committee Chair Dr Jerome Delli Priscoli
- Website: gwp.org

The Global Water Partnership (GWP) is an international network created to foster an integrated approach to water resources management (IWRM) and provide practical advice for sustainably managing water resources. It operates as a network, open to all organisations, including government institutions, agencies of the United Nations, bi- and multi-lateral development banks, professional associations, research institutions, non-governmental organisations, and the private sector.

== History ==
GWP grew out of decades of dissatisfaction with water management practices and a consensus that a more sustainable approach was needed. Several large international conferences and agreements had particular influence over its formation:

- The 1972 Stockholm Conference on the Environment
- The 1977 Mar del Plata Conference,
- The 1992 Dublin Conference was held in preparation for the United Nations Conference on Environment and Development (UNCED) (Earth Summit) in Rio de Janeiro the same year. One outcome of the Dublin Conference were the "Dublin Principles" that are the founding pillars of IWRM.
- Agenda 21 that came out of the UNECD formally integrated the Dublin principles in Chapter 18: Protection of the Quality & Supply of Freshwater Resources: Application of Integrated Approaches to the Development, Management & Use of Water Resources".

The GWP was founded in 1996 with the support of the World Bank, the United Nations Development Programme (UNDP) and the Swedish International Development Cooperation Agency (Sida). Initially functioning as a unit of Sida, GWP became an intergovernmental organisation under international law known as the Global Water Partnership Organisation (GWPO) in 2002. The secretariat is based in Stockholm, Sweden.

== Organisational structure ==
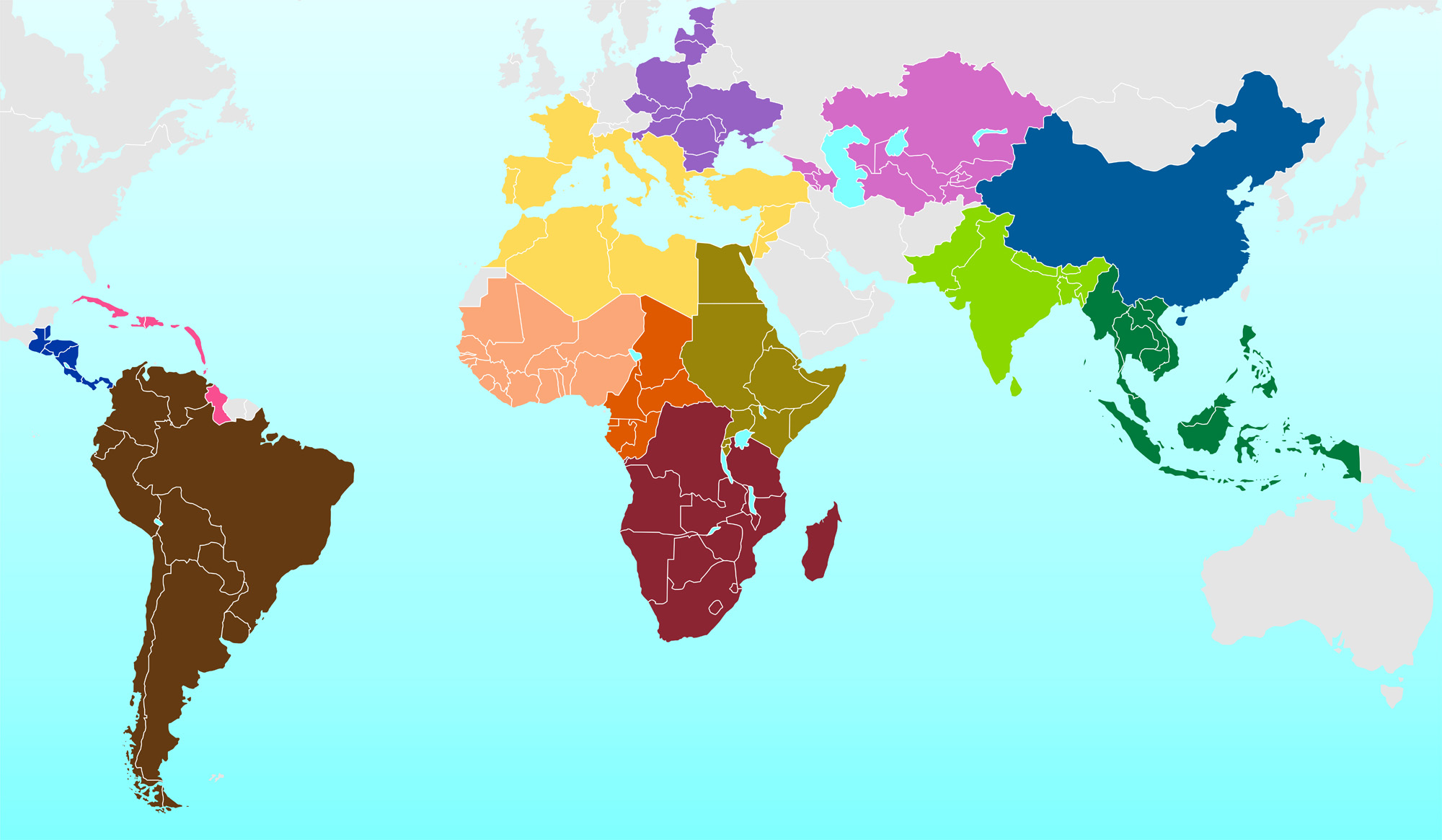
The GWP network has more than 3,000 partners in over 170 countries in 13 regions.

The Network currently comprises 13 Regional Water Partnerships and 68 accredited Country Water Partnerships and includes more than 3,000 institutional Partners located in over 170 countries. The 13 regions are Southern Africa, Eastern Africa, Central Africa, West Africa, the Mediterranean, Central and Eastern Europe, the Caribbean, Central America, South America, Central Asia and the Caucasus, South Asia, Southeast Asia, and China.

Although the activities are coordinated and supported by the Secretariat, Regional and Country Partnerships manage and govern themselves, and convene stakeholders to address specific issues.

The Global Secretariat supports the Executive Secretary, the Technical Committee and other GWP Committees, and the Regional Water Partnerships in governance, finance, communications, planning, and operational management of programmes and administration. In addition, GWP is supported by its Technical Committee which consists of professionals selected for their experience in different disciplines relating to water resources management.

The GWP Chair is Howard Bamsey, who took up the position in January 2019. The Executive Secretary and CEO is Darío Soto-Abril (effective 1 March 2021) and the Chair of the GWP Technical Committee is Dr Jerome Delli Priscoli. Its Patrons are Dr. Ismail Serageldin and Margaret Catley-Carlson. the Prince of Orange Willem-Alexander was a Patron until 30 April 2013 when he became King of the Netherlands. In May 2014 Ellen Johnson Sirleaf, President of the Republic of Liberia, became a Patron of GWP.

== Operations and Actions ==
GWP's most important tasks are Capacity Building and Knowledge Sharing. This is done through publications, workshops, training courses, meetings, informal exchanges, and through its IWRM Toolbox website. The GWP IWRM Toolbox is a free platform and online database on IWRM with local, national, regional, and global case studies and references. It allows practitioners and professionals to discuss and analyse the various elements of the IWRM process and facilitates the prioritization of actions aimed at improving water governance and management, as well as engaging with a broader community for the solution of water-related problems.

GWP also operates with strategic allies through thematic programmes such as the Global Water and Climate Programme, the joint GWP-World Meteorological Organization Associated Programme on Flood Management and the Integrated Drought Management Programme. Key strategic allies include among others: CapNet UNDP, UN-Water and UNEP-DHI Centre.
