= Giancarlo Summa =

UN official

Giancarlo Summa is the Director of the United Nations Information Centre in Mexico City. Prior to this appointment of 15 August 2016 by United Nations Secretary-General Ban Ki-moon, he was the Director of the United Nations Information Centre in Rio de Janeiro, Brazil.

== Biographical Information ==
As the Director of the United Nations Information Centre in Rio de Janeiro, Summa led communications efforts in the country and was involved with web-based communications in Portuguese and initiatives for the 2014 FIFA World Cup, United Nations Conference on Sustainable Development (Rio+20) and other events. From 2003 to 2006 he was the Press and Information Officer at the Inter-American Development Bank Office in Paris. He was Head of the Press Office of the 2030 World Social Forum in Porto Alegre, Brazil and worked as a reporter, editor and foreign correspondent from 1992 until 2002 for several news organizations including Reuters, the Brazilian news magazines Atenção and Carta Capital and the Italian newspapers L’Unità and La Stampa. From 1989 to 1992, he worked as a consultant for MLAL, an Italian non-governmental organization on campaigns that were focused on human rights and the protection of the Amazon rainforest. He is a graduate of the Sorbonne Nouvelle University and holds a master's degree in Latin American studies.
