= Earthlife Africa =

South African environmental organization

Earthlife Africa is a South African environmental and anti-nuclear organisation founded in August 1988, in Johannesburg. Initially conceived of as a South African version of Greenpeace, the group began by playing a radical, anti-apartheid, activist role. ELA is arguably now more of a reformist lobby or pressure group. Considered by some to be a key voice in the emerging environmental justice movement, Earthlife Africa has been criticised for being too radical, and by others for "working with traditional conservation movements" in furthering the environmental struggle.

The Earthlife Africa constitution (and name) was formally adopted at the first national conference at Dal Josophat, near Paarl (outside Cape Town) during 1989. Earthlife Africa was chosen as a conscious attempt to avoid the split affecting two factions in Greenpeace who were vying for control of the organisation. ELA therefore took a different approach to the environmental struggle.

The ELA constitution was initially loosely based upon the Four Pillars of the Green Party and other movement documents. In attendance at this historical inauguration of South Africa's green movement were various members of related environmental organisations and ecology groups including Peter Lukey, Henk Coetzee, Mike Kantey, Elfrieda Strauss, David Robert Lewis, and Rachel Brown.

In December 1989 Earthlife Africa formally placed environmental issues on the agenda of the Conference for a Democratic Future.

According to Jacklyn Cock, "the concept of environmental justice was first introduced in South Africa at the Earthlife 1992 conference." Environmental Justice "was articulated as a black concept and a poor concept and it took root very well' More accurately, it was the Environmental Justice Network Forum (EJNF) which was initiated at the 1992 conference hosted by Earthlife Africa on the theme "What does it mean to be green in South Africa.' At this conference 325 civil society delegates resolved to redefine the environmental agenda in South Africa in broad terms and to move beyond the loose anarchist constitution which had bound members with 'values' as opposed to 'rights'. The South African National Conference on Environment and Development had already set the agenda of the green movement in 1991 and thus the 1992 ELA conference was merely a sequel and precursor of later development within the broader movement.

The exposure of pollution by Thor Chemicals, a corporation which imported toxic waste into South Africa, by Earthlife and EJNF working closely with the Legal Resources Centre, the Chemical Workers Industrial Union, affected workers and local communities was the crucial turning point in the re-framing and 'browning' of environmentalism in South Africa.

Earthlife launched the People's Environmental Centre, the Greenhouse in 2002.

2007 ELA participates in a parliamentary portfolio committee hearing into the nuclear industry, delivering submissions and hearing from widows and workers affected by the Pelindaba accident

September 2010, Public Enterprises Minister Barbara Hogan announces the ANC government decision to mothball the PBMR project. The cost to the taxpayer is in the region of between R7bn and R9.5Bn wasted on an unproven technology which could not produce a working reactor after more than 11 years of research.

== Conveners ==
- Maya Aberman (Cape Town branch) 2006
- Nosiphiwo Msithweni (Cape Town branch) 2007

== Campaigns ==
- Apartheid is an Ecology issue
- Nuclear Energy Costs the Earth Campaign (NECTEC)
- Toxics Campaign focuses mainly on the prevention of proposed incinerators, through input into EIAs
- Sustainable Energy and Climate Change Partnership (SECCP)

== Demonstrations & Actions ==
- 1998: picket at Durban harbour against a nuclear waste ship
- 2008: picket against the arrival of the USS Theodore Roosevelt
- 2012 The records and medical files of hundreds of the workers formally handed over to the Public Protector.
- 2017 Memorandum handed to Necsa relating to allegations of ill health caused to Necsa employees, accepted by Group CEO, Phumzile Tshelane.

== Publicity ==
- 1998: campaign against air pollution in Johannesburg, three prominent sculptures were decorated with gas masks. They disseminate information on issues such as climate change, genetic engineering and nuclear energy

== Conferences ==
- 1991 South African National Conference on Environment and Development
- 1992 What does it mean to be green in South Africa.

== Legal cases ==
- 1992 Thor Chemicals is exposed resulting in various court applications that end up testing culpability of global corporates.
- 15 September 2003 Earthlife Africa - Cape Town launched a High Court application in Cape Town, seeking to review and set aside the environmental impact assessment (EIA) authorisation granted to Eskom to build a demonstration module Pebble Bed Modular Reactor (PBMR) at Koeberg, Cape Town.
- 2004 The clean-up operation for thousands of tons of Thor Chemicals mercury waste begins after an agreement with the British-owned chemical company to pay R24-million towards disposal costs.
- 2005 Earthlife Africa (Cape Town Branch) v Eskom Holdings Ltd, Access to Information Necsa provided information upon request, in terms of the Promotion of Access to Information Act (PAIA)), which was promulgated in 2000, regarding former employees.The request was received from the South African Historical Archives (SAHA) who acted on behalf of Earthlife Africa (ELA) who in turn acted on behalf of the former employees.
- Earthlife Africa (Cape Town) v Director General Department of Environmental Affairs and Tourism and Another (7653/03) [2005] ZAWCHC 7; 2005 (3) SA 156 (C) [2006] 2 All SA 44 (C) (26 January 2005) The director-general: department of environmental affairs & tourism decision, made on 25 June 2003 in terms of s 22(3) of the Environment Conservation Act 73 of 1989, authorising the Eskom Holding's construction of a pebble bed modular reactor at Koeberg, was reviewed and set aside. The matter was remitted to the director-general with directions to afford the applicant and other interested parties an opportunity of addressing further written submissions to him along the lines as set out in this judgement and within such period as he may determine and to consider such submissions before making a decision anew on Eskom's application. Both the director-general and Eskom were ordered jointly and severally to pay the applicant's costs, including the costs of two counsel.
- 2015, SAFCEI and Earthlife Africa Jhb (ELA) joined hands in taking on legal action against the government's proposed nuclear deal. SAFCEI and ELA (Jhb) filed court papers against the Department of Energy (DoE), National Parliament, NERSA and President Zuma, challenging various aspects of the nuclear procurement process.
- 2017 landmark victory 22–24 February 2017 where the government was ordered to pay punitive costs of the above cases.
- 2017 Earthlife Africa Johannesburg declared a major victory on Wednesday 8 March after winning South Africa's first climate change case and forcing the government to reassess the impact of a coal power plant.
- 2017 High Court asked once again to halt nuclear deal

== See also ==
- Conservation movement
- Ecology
- Ecology movement
- Environmentalism
- Environmental movement
- Environmental protection
- List of environmental organizations
- Natural resource
- Renewable resource
- Sustainable development
- Sustainability
