= Regional Forum on Environment and Health in Southeast and East Asian Countries =

The Regional Forum on Environment and Health in Southeast and East Asian Countries is a global framework for action provided by Agenda 21 of the 1992 United Nations Conference on Environment and Development; the Johannesburg Plan of Implementation of 2002 World Summit on Sustainable Development; the Millennium Development Goals of the United Nations and the recommendations of the fifth Ministerial Conference on Environment and Development in Asia and the Pacific (held at Seoul, South Korea in March 2005) on enhancing the environmental sustainability of economic growth. The second Ministerial Regional Forum was held 14–16 July 2010 in Jeju Province, South Korea. The forum is held every three years; the first was in Bangkok in August 2007.

== Charter ==
- Recognizing that the environment greatly affects health,
- Acknowledging the importance of ensuring the protection of human health and the environment,
- Understanding that children, the elderly and the poor are among the most vulnerable to and suffer most from environmental deterioration,
- Conscious that improving environmental health and ensuring sustainable economic growth are key components of poverty reduction,
- Realizing that the maintenance of health and well-being depend on environmental quality and sustainable development,
- Underlining the importance and cost-effectiveness of giving priority to preventive action,
- Conscious of the urgency to take immediate, coordinated action involving all relevant government agencies, organizations from the private sector, civil society, academia and media,
- Aware that solutions require inter-disciplinary and cross-sectoral interventions with experts from physical and natural sciences, health and social sciences, development, finance and other fields,
- Realizing the specific characteristics, cultural diversity and needs of the region (its unprecedented economic development, rapid urbanization and population growth and widespread poverty),
- Admitting that nations in the region are physically interconnected by shared bodies of water and air,
- Mindful that many environmental and health issues are trans-boundary in nature and that globalization has highlighted the interdependence of nations, communities and individuals,
- Keeping in mind existing international agreements on the protection of the ozone layer, climate change, biodiversity conservation, the management of chemicals and wastes and other initiatives related to environment and health,
- Mindful of the precautionary approach and guided by the "polluter pays" principle and the norms of good governance including civic engagement and participation, efficiency, equity, transparency and accountability,
- Taking note of the various efforts being undertaken by various countries at the national and regional levels,

The ministers responsible for the environment and health of the Southeast Asian countries of Brunei, Cambodia, Indonesia, Lao People's Democratic Republic, Malaysia, Myanmar, Philippines, Singapore, Thailand and Viet Nam, and the East Asian countries of China, Japan, Mongolia and the Republic of Korea, meeting together for the first time at Bangkok on 9 August 2007, adopted the charter of the Regional Forum on Environment and Health; have agreed upon the principles, vision, goals and objectives, strategies and structures set forth therein as the basis for their joint commitment to collective and individual country actions, and call upon their international partners to support the implementation of the charter.

== Sustainable development ==
Sustainable development encompasses nurturing the environment, enhancing economic growth and social equity to reduce poverty, promoting the health and well-being of people and encouraging partnerships and cooperation among stakeholders and countries in the region. Without environmental and health protection, development is undermined. Without economic growth (essential to poverty reduction and improving the quality of life), protection of the environment and promotion of health will also fail. The Regional Forum's vision is to safeguard and enhance health and the environment, promoting development which reduces poverty. The interplay of health and environment and their role in poverty reduction needs to be understood and addressed. This can be achieved by a national approach that integrates the efforts of stakeholders in preserving the environment with the protection of human health and well-being. The regional forum also believes that national efforts for environmental preservation and health protection may be affected by development activities and environmental and health conditions in neighboring countries. Thus, greater regional partnership and cooperation are needed to address common interests and threats to the region.

== Goals and objectives ==
The general objective of the regional initiative is to effectively deal with the environmental-health problems within countries and among themselves by increasing the capacity of Southeast and East Asian countries in environmental-health management. It aims to strengthen the cooperation of the ministries responsible for environment and health within the countries and across the region by providing a mechanism for sharing knowledge and experiences, improving policy and regulatory frameworks at the national and regional level, and promoting the implementation of integrated environmental-health strategies and regulations.

== Initiatives ==
- Effectively and efficiently achieve their targets in health, environmental sustainability, poverty and global partnership for development under the United Nations Millennium Development Goals (MDG)
- Institutionalize the integrated management of environmental health at all levels within each participating country and among the Southeast and East Asian countries through the establishment of a coordinated institutional mechanism
- Enable countries to assess priority environmental health risks, develop and implement cost-effective national environmental health action plans (NEHAP) and disseminate them to stakeholders

== Future plans ==
The member countries of the Regional Forum on Environment and Health in Southeast and East Asian Countries should:

- Undertake the best possible actions available to address (and reverse) the trend of environmental degradation and its negative impact on health to ensure the implementation of global and regional agreements (such as the Millennium Development Goals)
- Establish and/or strengthen existing inter-agency and multi-sector technical working groups and national coordination mechanisms and processes, linking these with other countries in the region to facilitate capacity-building and the exchange of information, technology, resources and learning
- Prepare and regularly update NEHAP (or equivalent plans) and ensure their implementation so priority environmental-health issues in each country are effectively addressed
- Build the capacity of stakeholders so they can be mobilized to support the implementation of NEHAP
- Strengthen collaboration among themselves and with other regional and global intergovernmental bodies on trans-boundary, regional, and global environmental-health issues (including attendance at the regional forum
- Advocate for adequate budgets and resources for the environment and health sectors in their countries
- Ensure that the charter is widely disseminated within each country and across the region in the languages of the region

International partner organizations are encouraged to:

- Support this regional initiative by providing needed technical and financial assistance and sharing information and expertise
- Support the development and implementation of NEHAP and equivalent plans
- Intensify coordination and cooperation among themselves to optimize the use of resources
- Ensure proper coordination with existing intergovernmental processes

Countries and partner organizations should work for the widest possible endorsement of the charter, to ensure the attainment of its objectives. Ministers responsible for environment and health of southeast and east-Asian countries will meet every three years to assess national and regional progress and agree on specific actions to reduce significant environmental threats to health.
