= Margaret Catley-Carlson =

Margaret Catley-Carlson OC
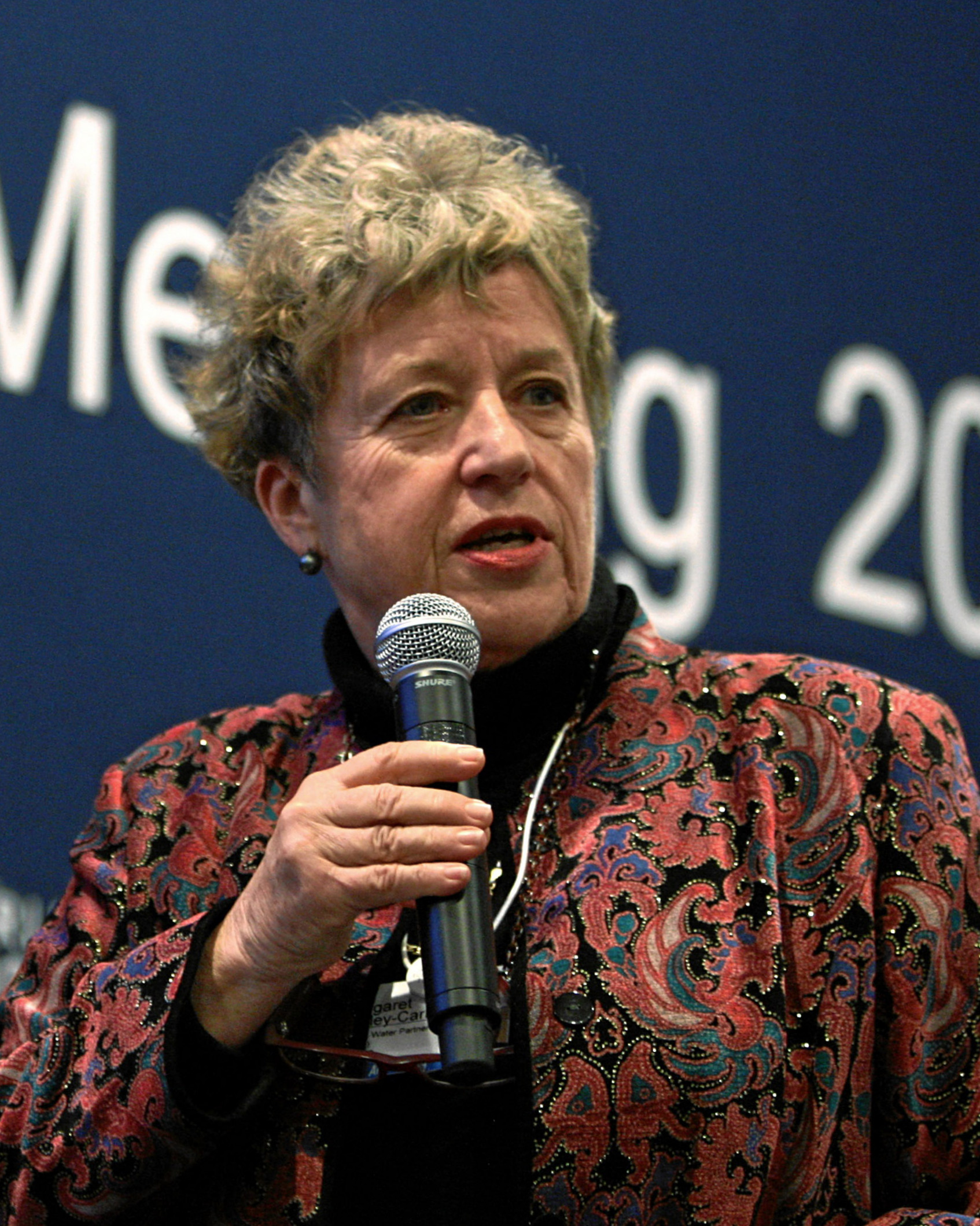
- Margaret Catley-Carlson at the World Economic Forum annual meeting in Davos, 2010
- Born: October 6, 1942 (age 83); Regina, Saskatchewan
- Occupation: public servant
- Awards: Order of Canada

Margaret Catley-Carlson, OC (born 6 October 1942) is a Canadian civil servant. She was chair and is now a Patron of the Global Water Partnership, a working partnership among all those involved in water management formed in 1996 by the World Bank, the United Nations Development Program and the Swedish International Development Cooperation Agency. Beginning in 2000 she also served as the chair of the now dissolved Water Resources Advisory Committee of Suez, a multinational private water company.

Born in Regina, Saskatchewan, she grew up in Nelson, British Columbia before receiving a Bachelor of Arts degree from the University of British Columbia in 1966. In 1966, she joined the Department of External Affairs and had assignments in Colombo and London. In 1978, she was appointed Vice President (Multilateral) of the Canadian International Development Agency (CIDA). and was Senior Vice President/Acting President from 1979 to 1980. In 1981, she was assistant secretary general in the United Nations, serving as deputy executive director of operations for the United Nations Children's Fund. From 1983 to 1989, she was President of the CIDA. From 1989 to 1992, she was the Deputy Minister of Health and Welfare Canada. From 1992 to 1996, she was the Chair of the Water Supply & Sanitation Collaborative Council at the WHO. From 1993 to 1999, she was the sixth president of the Population Council.

In 1984, she was appointed to the Board of Governor of the International Development Research Centre (IDRC), a Canadian crown corporation that supports researchers from the developing world in their search for the means to build healthier, more equitable, and more prosperous societies. She has served for four non-consecutive terms. She is a member of the Board of Trustees of the International Institute for Environment and Development.

== Honours ==
In 2002, she was appointed an Officer of the Order of Canada (OC) in recognition of "her distinguished public service career". She has received honorary degrees from the University of Regina (1985), Saint Mary's University, Ryerson Polytechnical Institute(1986), Concordia University (1989), Mount Saint Vincent University (1990), University of British Columbia (1993), University of Calgary (1994), Carleton University (1994) and University of Dundee, as a Doctor of Law, Honoris Causa (2007).

She received the Queen Elizabeth II Golden Jubilee Medal in 2002, and in 2012 was awarded the Queen Elizabeth II Diamond Jubilee Medal.
