= Julia Bunting =

British demographer and campaigner for reproductive health

- Occupation: Demographer
- Known for: Ninth president of the Population Council; Director at the International Planned Parenthood Federation

Julia Bunting is a British demographer who is the ninth president of the Population Council, since March 2015. She currently works to build a body of research on how best to support young girls.

== Early life ==
During an exchange visit to rural areas of Tanzania, she saw firsthand great disparities in reproductive healthcare.

== Career ==
Bunting is known for her work on reproductive and maternal health during her 12-year tenure at the United Kingdom's Department for International Development (DFID), where she oversaw the government's policies for international development on HIV/AIDS, maternal, newborn, and child health and rights, and population. There, she campaigned to address maternal mortality as a tractable problem, and worked on the FP2020 pledge to grant access to contraceptives and family planning to 120 million girls and women in the world's poorest countries. She helped develop the global quantitative goal of "120 by 20" at the London Summit on Family Planning in July 2012, which she helped organize, along with a 2017 revival of the summit. The 2012 summit raised $2.6 billion.

She also served as a director at the International Planned Parenthood Federation, as a Programme and Technical lead.

Under her leadership, the Population Council-developed (in conjunction with pharmaceutical company TherapeuticsMD) contraceptive vaginal ring Annovera obtained FDA approval in 2018. The device lasts a year and does not require refrigeration or regular clinic visits, making it well-suited for use in low-income countries. The Population Council also announced in 2018 that their contraceptive gel for men had entered phase two clinical trials, specifically a skin-applied Nestorone/testosterone hormonal gel.

== Awards ==
In 2013, Julia was inducted as an Officer of the Order of the British Empire (OBE) for improving reproductive health in developing countries.
