= Global Map =

Set of digital maps

Global Map is a set of digital maps that accurately cover the whole globe to express the status of global environment. It is developed through the cooperation of National Geospatial Information Authorities (NGIAs) in the world. An initiative to develop Global Map under international cooperation, the Global Mapping Project, was advocated in 1992 by the Ministry of Construction, Japan (MOC) at the time (the current Ministry of Land, Infrastructure, Transport and Tourism, Japan-MLIT).

Global Map is digital geospatial information in 1 km resolution which satisfies the following conditions:

1. Covering the whole land area of the globe
2. In consistent specifications
3. Easily accessible by anyone in marginal cost

The global geospatial information developed as Global Map mainly consists of the following thematic layers:

- Transportation
- Boundary
- Drainage
- Population Centers
- Elevation
- Vegetation (Percent Tree Cover)
- Land Cover
- Land Use

== History ==
Since the United Nations Conference on the Human Environment in 1972, global environmental challenges have been recognized as an issue which is common to humankind. “The United Nations Conference on Environment and Development (the Earth Summit)” in Brazil in 1992 adopted “An action plan of humankind for sustainable development: Agenda 21.” Agenda 21 describes in many parts the importance of information for decision-making to appropriately cope with global environmental challenges. Especially geospatial information is regarded to be critical.

In response to the objectives of Agenda 21 and in recognition of the need for further contribution to the development of geospatial information, the MOC at the time (the current MLIT) advocated, in the same year, the Global Mapping Project, an international cooperation initiative to develop global geospatial information to understand the present status and changes of global environment. This concept was presented at the Fifth United Nations Regional Cartographic Conference for the Americas in New York in 1993. At the same time, resolution calling for the promotion of the development of global geospatial data was adopted at this conference. Following this conference, a similar resolution was adopted at Thirteenth United Nations Regional Cartographic Conference for Asia and the Pacific in Beijing in 1994.

In 1996, International Steering Committee for Global Mapping (ISCGM), which consists of heads or its equivalents of NGIAs, was established to promote the Global Mapping Project. Thus the mechanism for the international promotion was formed. The Geospatial Information Authority of Japan (GSI) has been serving as the secretariat of the ISCGM. In the following year, in 1997, which was five years after the Earth Summit, the nineteenth special session of the United Nations General Assembly (19th UNGASS) was held. At the paragraph 112 of the resolution adopted by the 19th UNGASS, importance of a supportive environment to enhance national capacities and capabilities for information collection and processing, especially in developing countries, to facilitate public access to information on global environmental issues was mentioned along with the description mentioning the significance of international cooperation, including global mapping, as a means to develop the supportive environment.

As a result of such movement, in 1998, a recommendatory letter to participate in the Global Mapping Project was sent from the United Nations to NGIAs of respective countries in the world.

Further, at the World Summit on Sustainable Development (Johannesburg Summit) held in 2002, global mapping was included in the Plan of Implementation.

== See also ==
- United Nations initiative on Global Geospatial Information Management (UN-GGIM)
