= United Nations Conference on Sustainable Development =

2012 international conference in Brazil

Coordinates: 22.9098°S 43.1763°W

- Date: 13–22 June 2012
- Locations: Rio de Janeiro, Brazil
- Country: Brazil
- Previous event: Earth Summit 1992; Earth Summit 2002
- Participants: 45,400 accredited participants, including 88 heads of state or government (57 Heads of state and 31 Heads of government), as well as 8 Vice-Presidents
- Website: uncsd2012

The United Nations Conference on Sustainable Development (UNCSD), also known as Rio 2012, Rio+20 (Portuguese pronunciation: [ˈʁi.u ˈmajʒ ˈvĩtʃi]), or Earth Summit 2012 was the third international conference on sustainable development aimed at reconciling the economic and environmental goals of the global community. Hosted by Brazil in Rio de Janeiro from 13 to 22 June 2012, Rio+20 was a 20-year follow-up to the 1992 United Nations Conference on Environment and Development (UNCED) held in the same city, and the 10th anniversary of the 2002 World Summit on Sustainable Development (WSSD) in Johannesburg.

The ten-day mega-summit, which culminated in a three-day high-level UN conference, was organized by the United Nations Department of Economic and Social Affairs and included participation from 192 UN member states – including 57 head of state and 31 head of government, private sector companies, NGOs and other groups. The decision to hold the conference was made by UN General Assembly Resolution A/RES/64/236 on 24 December 2009. It was intended to be a high-level conference, including heads of state and government or other representatives and resulting in a focused political document designed to shape global environmental policy.

During the final three days of the Conference, from 20 to 22 June 2012, world leaders and representatives met for intense meetings which culminated in finalizing the non-binding document, "The Future We Want", which opens with: "We the Heads of State and Government and high-level representatives, having met at Rio de Janeiro, Brazil, from 20 to 22 June 2012, with the full participation of civil society, renew our commitment to sustainable development and to ensuring the promotion of an economically, socially and environmentally sustainable future for our planet and for present and future generations."

== Background ==
In 1992, the first conference of its kind, the United Nations Conference on Environment and Development (UNCED), commonly referred to as the Rio Conference or Earth Summit, succeeded in raising public awareness of the need to integrate environment and development. The conference drew 109 heads of state to Rio de Janeiro, Brazil, to address what were dubbed urgent problems of environmental protection and socio-economic development. The Earth Summit influenced subsequent UN conferences, including Rio+20 and set the global green agenda. "The World Conference on Human Rights, for example, focused on the right of people to a healthy environment and the right to development; controversial demands that had met with resistance from some Member States until the Earth Summit."

Major outcomes of the conference include the United Nations Framework Convention on Climate Change (UNFCCC) – a climate-change agreement that led to the Kyoto Protocol, Agenda 21, the United Nations Convention on Biological Diversity (CBD) and the United Nations Convention to Combat Desertification (UNCCD). It also created new international institutions, among them the Commission on Sustainable Development, tasked with the follow-up to the Rio Conference and led to the reform of the Global Environment Facility.

Ten years later, Earth Summit 2002, informally nicknamed Rio+10, was held in Johannesburg, South Africa, with the goal of again bringing together leaders from government, business and NGOs to agree on a range of measures toward similar goals. At Rio+10, sustainable development was recognized as an overarching goal for institutions at the national, regional and international levels. There, the need to enhance the integration of sustainable development in the activities of all relevant United Nations agencies, programs and funds was highlighted. The discussion also encompassed the role of institutions in stepping up efforts to bridge the gap between the international financial institutions and the multilateral development banks and the rest of the UN system.

Major outcomes of that conference include the Johannesburg Declaration and almost 300 international partnership initiatives meant to help achieve the Millennium Development Goals.

== Objectives ==
The conference had three objectives – to secure renewed political commitment for sustainable development, to assess the progress and implementation gaps in meeting previous commitments, and to address new and emerging challenges.

== Conference themes ==
The official discussions had two main themes, how to build a green economy to achieve sustainable development and lift people out of poverty, including support for developing countries that will allow them to find a green path for development; and how to improve international coordination for sustainable development by building an institutional framework.

The conference also popularised the term blue economy.

== Rio+20 formal preparatory process ==
In the months leading up to the beginning of the conference, negotiators held frequent informal consultations at UN headquarters in New York City, and in the two weeks before the conference was scheduled to begin, they managed to reach consensus on the sensitive language in the then proposed outcome document for the summit.

According to historian Felix Dodds in his 2014 co-authored 2014 book entitled, From Rio+20 to a New Development Agenda: Building a Bridge to a Sustainable Future, the United Nations Conference on Sustainable Development – Rio+20 formal preparatory process, can be divided into three phases.

Phase one took place from May 2010 to January 2012 – when preliminary intergovernmental discussions and negotiations began, and national, regional, and local level preparations were being made. This stage ended with the January 2012 publication of the draft document, "The Future We Want" The 1st Preparatory Committee was held from 16 to 18 May 2010, immediately after the conclusion of the eighteenth session and the first meeting of the nineteenth session of the Commission on Sustainable Development. The 1st Intersessional – which was not a negotiation session – featured panel discussions, from academia, non-governmental organizations as well as Delegates and UN system representatives – was held from 10 to 11 January 2011 at UN Headquarters, New York. The 2nd Preparatory Committee was held from 7–8 March 2011, at United Nations Headquarters in New York, immediately following the Intergovernmental Policy Meeting for the 19th Session of the Commission on Sustainable Development. The 2nd Intersessional was held from 15 to 16 December 2011 at United Nations Headquarters in New York.

Phase two – from March 2012 to April 2012 – began with the first informal negotiations and concluded with the April 2012 release of co-chairs streamline text of "The Future We Want". The 3rd Intersessional was held from 5–7 March 2012 at United Nations Headquarters in New York.

Phase three – from 9 April 2012 to 15 June 2012 – began with the second round of negotiations starting on 9 April 2012, and ending with the 15 June 2012 closing of the Third Preparatory Committee meeting, when negotiators were already in Rio de Janeiro, Brazil. Th three-day intense meetings with hundreds of "heads of states from around the world" met in Rio de Janeiro after the 3rd Preparatory Meeting had concluded.

== United Nations Conference on Sustainable Development ==
According to a 13 June 2012 Washington Post article, the "giant, 10-day-long" Conference underway in Rio de Janeiro which would end on 22 June 2012, was "expected to draw 50,000 participants, including delegates, environmental activists, business leaders, and indigenous groups." For the final three days of the conference, over 100 heads and vice-heads of state and government were present.

Billed as the biggest UN event ever organized – with 15,000 soldiers and police guarding over 100 heads and vice-heads of state and government, from 192 countries, and the more than 45,000 individuals gathered in Rio de Janeiro – the 10-day mega-conference was intended to be a high-level international gathering organized to re-direct and renew global political commitment to the three dimensions of sustainable development: economic growth, social improvement and environmental protection; focusing on reducing poverty while promoting jobs growth, clean energy and more fair, sustainable uses of resources; goals first established at Earth Summit in 1992.

The conference centered around Agenda 21, the outcome document from Earth Summit 1992. That document was considered revolutionary in that it essentially created the term sustainable development and created the global environmental agenda for the next 20 years. The representatives of participating governments gathered in Rio to discuss what was then the draft text of the outcome document.

Rio+20 sought to secure affirmations for the political commitments made at past Earth Summits and set the global environmental agenda for the next 20 years by assessing progress towards the goals set forth in Agenda 21 and implementation gaps therein, and discussing new and emerging issues. The UN wanted Rio to endorse a UN "green economy roadmap", with environmental goals, targets and deadlines, whereas developing countries preferred establishing new "sustainable development goals" to better protect the environment, guarantee food and power to the poorest, and alleviate poverty.

Rio+20 attracted many protests, and more than 500 parallel events, exhibitions, presentations, fairs and announcements as a wide range of diverse groups struggled to take advantage of the conference in order to gain international attention. The British online newspaper The Guardian reported that, "Downtown Rio de Janeiro was partly shut-down as an estimated 50,000 protesters, some of whom were naked, took to the streets."

=== The future we want ===
From 20 to 22 June 2012, world leaders and representatives met for intense meetings which culminated in finalizing the non-binding document, "The Future We Want: Outcome document of the United Nations Conference on Sustainable Development Rio de Janeiro, Brazil, 20–22 June 2012", which opens with, "We the Heads of State and Government and high-level representatives", having met at Rio de Janeiro, Brazil, from 20 to 22 June 2012, with the full participation of civil society, renew our commitment to sustainable development and to ensuring the promotion of an economically, socially and environmentally sustainable future for our planet and for present and future generations."

The first draft of the document was released in January 2012 as a result of preliminary intergovernmental discussions and negotiations that had taken place since May 2010. A streamlined version of "The Future We Want" was released in April 2012 following the second phase of negotiations.

At the Rio+20 Conference in June 2012, the heads of state of the 192 governments in attendance, renewed their political commitment to sustainable development and declared their commitment to the promotion of a sustainable future through the 49-page nonbinding document, "The Future We Want: Outcome document of the United Nations Conference on Sustainable Development Rio de Janeiro, Brazil, 20–22 June 2012." The dates 20 to 22 June reflect the three-day meeting of world leaders, the culmination of Rio+20.

The document largely reaffirms previous action plans like Agenda 21.

The document, "The Future We Want," called for the development of Sustainable Development Goals (SDGs), a set of measurable targets aimed at promoting sustainable development globally. It is thought that the SDGs [would] pick up where the Millennium Development Goals leave off and address criticism that the original Goals fail to address the role of the environment in development.

There were eight key recommendations regarding the UN Environment Programme (UNEP), which included strengthening its governance to potentially become, a "leading global environmental authority", through universal membership, increasing its financial resources and strengthening its engagement in key UN coordination bodies.

According to a 23 June 2012 The Guardian article, nations agreed to explore alternatives to GDP as a measure of wealth that take environmental and social factors into account in an effort to assess and pay for 'environmental services' provided by nature, such as carbon sequestration and habitat protection.

Recognition that "fundamental changes in the way societies consume and produce are indispensable for achieving global sustainable development." EU officials suggest it could lead to a shift of taxes so workers pay less and polluters and landfill operators pay more.

The document calls the need to return ocean stocks to sustainable levels "urgent" and calls on countries to develop and implement science-based management plans.

All nations reaffirmed commitments to phase out fossil fuel subsidies.

In addition to the outcome text, there were over 400 voluntary commitments for sustainable development made by Member States.

At the African Ministerial Conference on the Environment, 40 African countries agreed to implement "The Future We Want".

== Leaders in attendance ==
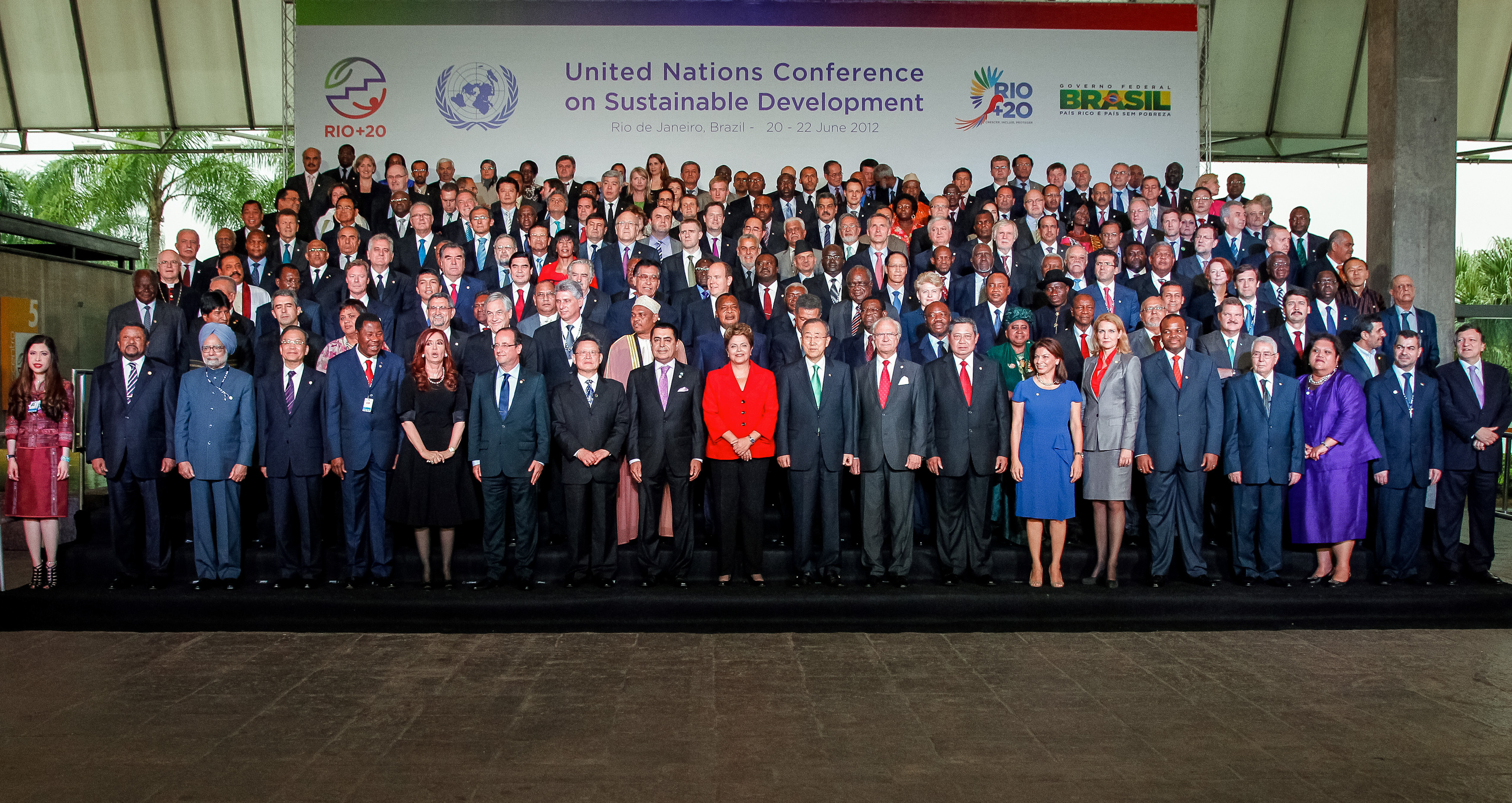
World leaders in attendance at Rio+20

A few key global leaders – mostly G20 leaders and namely United States President Barack Obama, German Chancellor Angela Merkel, and UK Prime Minister David Cameron – did not attend the conference and blamed their absence on the ongoing European sovereign-debt crisis. Their collective absence was seen as a reflection of their administrations' failure to prioritize sustainability issues. "In not attending, the prime minister is sending out a powerful signal that the UK government does not see sustainability as a priority", Joan Walley, chair of the UK environmental audit committee said to The Guardian.

- Albania – Prime Minister Sali Berisha
- (Antigua and Barbuda) Antigua & Barbuda – Prime Minister Baldwin Spencer
- Argentina – President Cristina Fernández de Kirchner
- Australia – Prime Minister Julia Gillard
- Bolivia – President Evo Morales, see Bolivian government proposal Harmony with nature
- Brazil – President Dilma Rousseff
- Bulgaria – President Rosen Plevneliev
- Chile – President Sebastián Piñera
- China – Premier Wen Jiabao
- Costa Rica – President Laura Chinchilla Miranda
- Denmark – Prime Minister Helle Thorning-Schmidt
- Ecuador – President Rafael Correa
- France – President Francois Hollande
- Grenada – Prime Minister Tillman Thomas
- Haiti – President Michel Martelly
- India – Prime Minister Manmohan Singh
- Indonesia – President Susilo Yudhoyono
- Iran – President Mahmoud Ahmadinejad
- Lithuania – President Dalia Grybauskaitė
- Nepal – Prime Minister Baburam Bhattarai
- Nigeria – President Goodluck Jonathan
- Norway – Prime Minister Jens Stoltenberg
- Portugal – Prime Minister Pedro Passos Coelho
- Russia – President Dmitry Medvedev
- South Africa – President Jacob Zuma
- South Korea – President Lee Myung bak
- Spain – Prime Minister Mariano Rajoy
- Sri Lanka – President Mahinda Rajapaksa
- Sweden – Prime Minister Fredrik Reinfeldt
- Turkmenistan – President Gurbanguly Berdimuhamedow
- Uruguay – President Jose Mujica
- Zimbabwe – President Robert Mugabe

among others

== Environmental and Indigenous Rights Activists ==
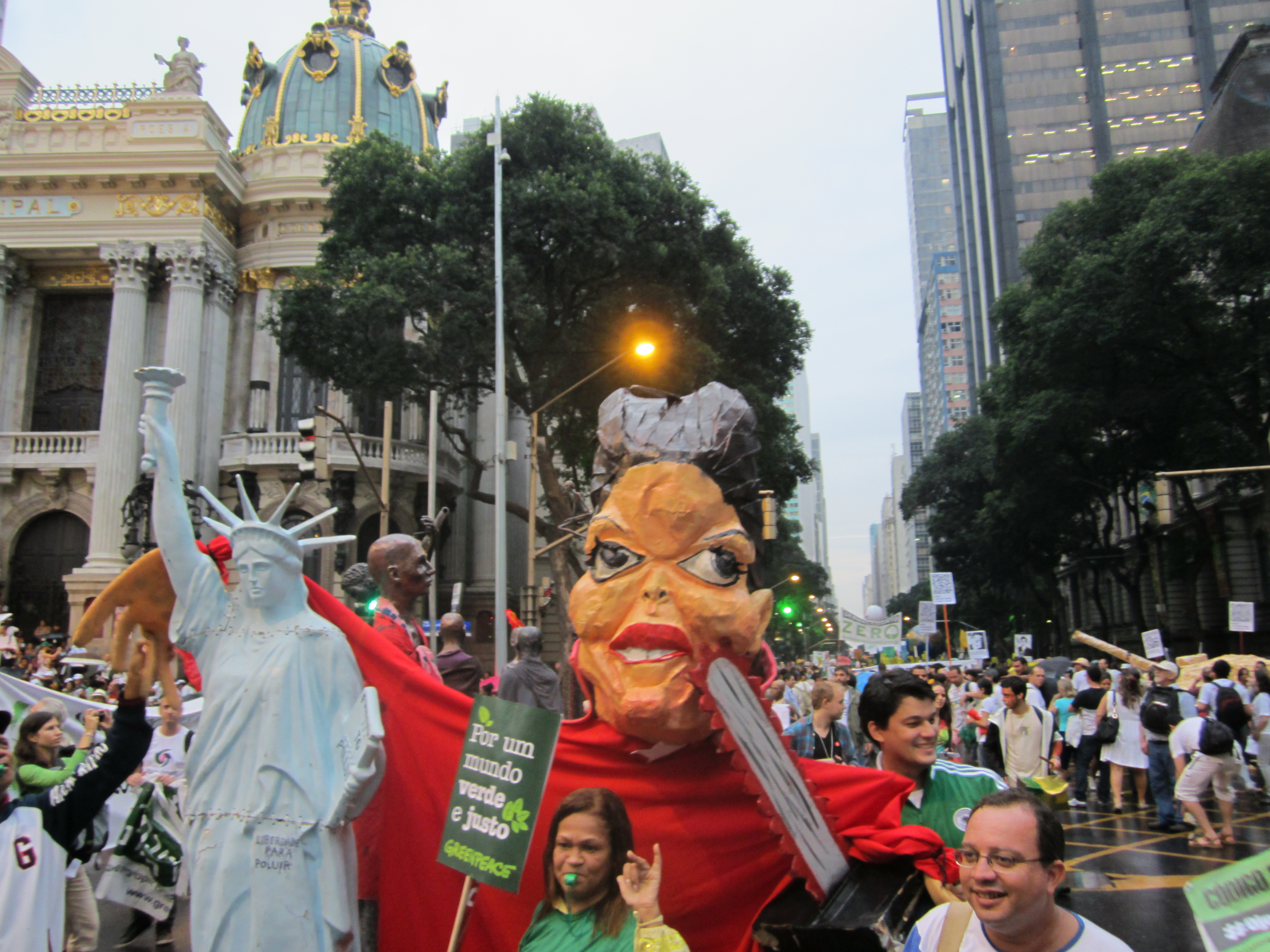
Demonstration at Rio+20. Picture shows effigy of Brazilian President Dilma Rousseff with a chainsaw and embracing a replica of the Statue of Liberty.

Activists took initiative at Rio+20 by staging numerous protests. Activists joined forces to stand up to what they said was exploitation and degradation of the Earth, as well as the negation of the rights of indigenous peoples. National Geographic said that activists that support protecting the environment, are particularly relevant in Brazil, as deforestation threatens Amazonian ethnic groups every day.

In addition to holding signs and shouting chants, the crowds took a theatric route to convey their messages. Firstly, they poked at Brazilian President Dilma Rousseff, claiming she has given in to the global North's corporate hand. Rousseff's controversy has arisen over her steadfast desire to further industrialize Brazil, and its economy. Additionally, the crowds assembled for a ritual and symbolic "tearing up" of the plenary's negotiated text, conveying their disapproval.

Thousands of non-governmental organizations (NGOs) gathered at the Flamengo Park in Rio. They criticized the draft negotiating text, particularly for its failure to mention planetary boundaries or nuclear energy, in light of the Fukushima disaster in Japan. Organizations, such as Greenpeace and the World Wide Fund for Nature, as well as members of indigenous communities, activists and artists participated. The Danish artist Jens Galschiøt, the leader of the group AIDOH, and the Group 92 used his Freedom to Pollute sculptures to focus on global warming and its resulting increased flow of refugees. About 20,000 flyers about Freedom to Pollute were distributed during Rio+20 and a related television program was produced in Denmark.

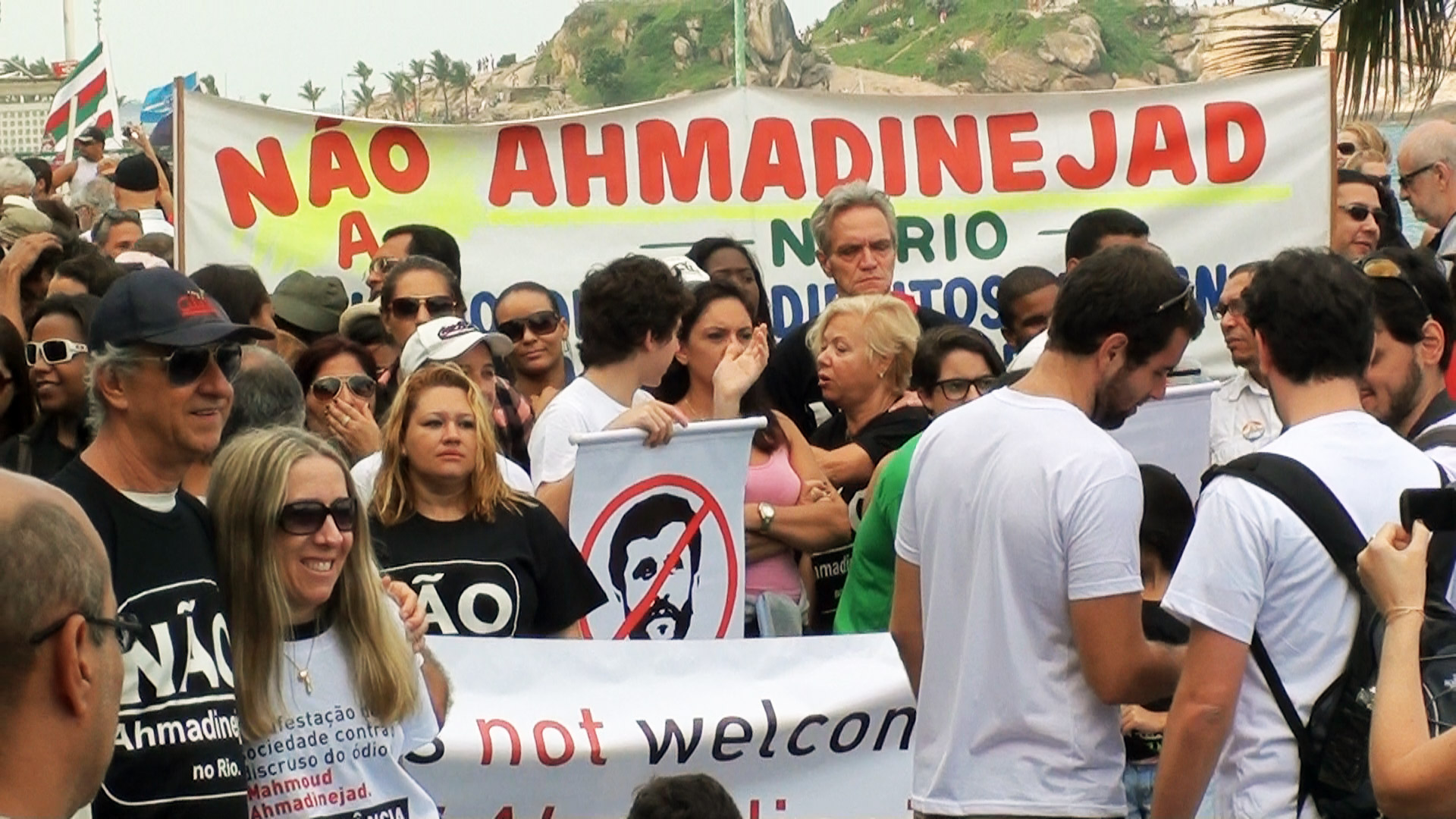
Demonstration against the President of Iran Mahmoud Ahmadinejad.

There were some demonstrations protesting the participation of the President of Iran Mahmoud Ahmadinejad along with the Iranian delegation. The controversy of Iranian attendance at the summit surrounds the fact that Iran has serious environmental issues, which it has refused to address, continuing human rights violations and is refusing to cooperate with the IAEA over its contentious nuclear program. Ahmadinejad was met with demonstrations, attended by thousands of people, on his 20 June arrival in Rio,

with some protesters waving banners with the slogan "Ahmadinejad go home".

== Participation by Civil Societies ==
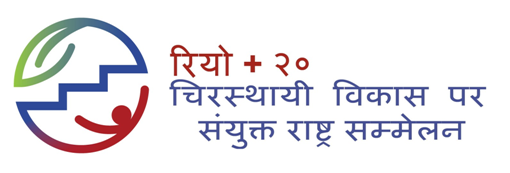
RIO +20 logo in Hindi created by CCLP Worldwide Team

During RIO +20 event and preparatory events UNCSD included stakeholders who were invited to organize side events, promote the RIO event, submit literature and help the Rio secretariat with translation work. The logo and promotion of RIO +20 was available in languages used in United Nations. Civil societies also translated the logo image and literature in other local and National languages.

== ProjectEarth Network ==
Ecology and Environment Inc., a New York-based Environmental Engineering and Consultation company partnered with UNCSD to create Project Earth Network, an online platform where schools around the world could showcase their remarkable environmental projects. In coordination with the Rio+20 event, the platform hosted a World Environment Dn on the environmental impact of plastic shopping bags, including research on plastic bag manufacturing processes, development of videos documenting plastic bag waste, and a school presentation at which reusable cloth shopping bags were sold to approximately 50 percent of the community.

Sarasota, Florida's Brookside Middle School won in the World Environment Day contest's North American sub-category for its mangrove propagule growth project while International Sce

The idea behind the platform was to encourage sustainabilmained as a positive legacy through the activities of students who were first recognized by the network.

== See also ==
- Earth Summit
  - Agenda 21
  - Rio Declaration on Environment and Development
- Durban III The conference opened on 22 September 2011
- Planetary boundaries
- Sustainable Development Goals
- The United Nations Ocean Conference
