= Art in Defence of Humanism =

Aidoh is a shortening for Art In Defence Of Humanism. AIDOH was created by the Danish artist Jens Galschiot as a group focusing on the inhuman treatment of people in different countries related to political, religious or economic interests. The group has with several occasions started a public debate about the individual countries overconsumption or governments repressive treatment of its own people.

== Manifests ==
=== My inner beast (1993) ===
Pigs in coats made of 1 ton black concrete. Is named one of the biggest art happenings in Europe. 20 sculptures were placered on public places in Europe without official approval. It took 55 hours to put them up, and the happening created a lot of public debate.

=== The silent death (1995) ===
In connection with UN's sociale summit in Copenhagen, were there placed 750 dolls, that pictured dead children in the age of 3–9 years. They were placed on street lamps, benches, fountains and other places to symbolize the thousands of children that die every day.

=== Pillar of Shame (1997) ===
Was placed in Hong Kong June 4, 1997. Since then it has been placed in many other places in the world where the governments does not respect human rights. The Pillar of Shame is made of copper and is 8 meters tall. It shows more than 50 tangled human bodies in pain.

=== WTO Hong Kong (2005) ===
The following sculptures were placed in Hong Kong in the December of 2005:

- Mad Cow Disease
- The survival of the fattest
- Hunger match

=== In the name of God (2006) ===
In the name of God is a series of copper sculptures of a crucified pregnant teenager intended as a commentary on the Christian church’s strict sexual teachings. These sculptures have been exhibited in Denmark, Sweden, Nicaragua and Kenya.
