= Commission on Sustainable Development =

Functional commission of the UN Economic and Social Council

The United Nations Commission on Sustainable Development (CSD) was a body under the UN Economic and Social Council (ECOSOC) tasked with overseeing the outcomes of the 1992 United Nations Conference on Environment and Development/Earth Summit. It was replaced in 2013 by the High-level Political Forum on Sustainable Development, which meets both under the General Assembly every four years and the ECOSOC in other years.

The CSD was established in December 1992 by General Assembly Resolution A/RES/47/191 as a functional commission of the UN Economic and Social Council, implementing a recommendation in Chapter 38 of Agenda 21, the landmark global agreement reached at the June 1992 United Nations Conference on Environment and Development/Earth Summit held in Rio de Janeiro, Brazil.

== CSD 1 ==
CSD 1, the first or "Organizational" session of the CSD, was held in New York in June 1993. The Organizational Session focused on a broad range of organizational and administrative issues, reflected in topics of the commission's documents :

- Budget implications of draft decisions
- Establishing a provisional agenda and a multi-year programme of work
- National reporting on implementation of Agenda 21
- Information exchange: UN System and donors
- UNCED follow-up: international organizations and UN coordination
- Coordination of development data
- Progress in environmentally sound technology transfer
- Government information on financial commitments
- Urgent and major emergent issues
- United Nations Conference on Trade and Development and Agenda 21 implementation
- UNEP and Agenda 21 implementation
- Future work
- Guidelines for national reporting
- Integrating sustainable development into the UN system

== CSD 5 ==
In its Fifth Session, the principal focus of the CSD was to prepare for the Five-Year Review of the 1992 Earth Summit, which took the form of the 19th Special Session of the General Assembly, held at UN Headquarters in New York.

== CSD 10/World Summit on Sustainable Development ==
For its Tenth Session the CSD served as the Preparatory Committee for the World Summit on Sustainable Development, held in Johannesburg, South Africa, in December 2002.

See the full article World Summit on Sustainable Development

== CSD 12 ==
The Twelfth Session of the CSD is the first substantive session since the Johannesburg Summit - CSD-11 was an organizational session that focused on establishing priorities and an agenda for the second ten-year cycle of the commission. Text below in "quotes" is from the introductory note from the chair - H.E. Børge Brende, Norwegian Minister of the Environment to a description of the organization of work during CSD-12

"The first three days of CSD-12 will serve as the preparatory meeting for the ten-year review of the Barbados Programme of Action (BPoA) for the Sustainable Development of Small Island Developing States.

The bulk of CSD-12 will focus on water, sanitation and human settlements. "The decision of CSD-11 to focus its first Implementation Cycle on Water, Sanitation and Human Settlements bears testimony to the sense of urgency the international community ascribes to these issues."

"Today, water-borne diseases kill a person every ten seconds, the overwhelming majority children, and roughly one in two Sub-Saharan Africans and three in five South Asians lack adequate sanitation. The total number of people living in slums is close to 930 million and is growing at an accelerated rate."

"The CSD-12 Review Session will feature a number of “firsts”. Thematic reviews will feature interactive discussions and will be introduced through keynote presentations, panel discussions and moderated debates. Major Group representatives will join Ministers in interactive dialogues during the High-Level Segment."

== CSD 16 ==
The chair was H.E. Francis Nhema, Zimbabwe's Minister of Environment and Tourism.

== CSD 18 ==
The 18th session took place in New York in May 2010, focusing on transport, chemicals, waste management, mining, and the ten-year framework of programmes on sustainable consumption and production patterns (SCP).

== CSD 19 ==
The 19th session took place in May 2011, as part of the policy cycle from the previous year. No agreement was reached in the negotiations and they eventually collapsed.

== United Nations Conference on Sustainable Development ==
CSD 20 was suspended from its normal rotation, planned in 2012 because the General Assembly had resolved to hold the United Nations Conference on Sustainable Development in Rio as the 20th anniversary to the original conference. United Nations Conference on Sustainable Development would focus on two themes:

1. Green economy within the context of sustainable development and poverty eradication.
2. Institutional framework for sustainable development.

With the objectives:

1. Securing renewed political commitment to sustainable development.
2. Assessing the progress and implementation gaps in meeting already agreed commitments.
3. Addressing new and emerging challenges.

== CSD 20 ==
Member states decided in resolution 67/203 of 21 December 2012 that the CSD would have its last session immediately prior to the convening of the first meeting of the High-level Political Forum on Sustainable Development in order to ensure a smooth institutional transition. CSD-20 took place in the morning of 20 September 2013.
