= Population Council =

Health and development research institute

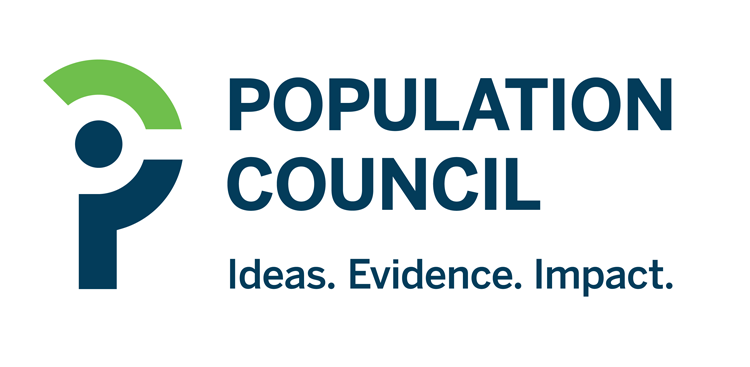
- Requests for use: Contact Population Council.
- Formation: 1952; 74 years ago
- Type: NGO
- Purpose: Reproductive health
- Headquarters: New York City
- Founder: John D. Rockefeller III
- Budget: $74 million
- Website: popcouncil.org

The Population Council is an international, nonprofit, non-governmental organization. The Council conducts research in biomedicine, social science, and public health and helps build research capacities in developing countries. One-third of its research relates to HIV and AIDS; while its other major program areas are still linked to its early foundation in reproductive health and its relation to poverty, youth, and gender. For example, the Population Council strives to teach boys that they can be involved in contraceptive methods regardless of stereotypes that limit male responsibility in child bearing. The organization held the license for Norplant contraceptive implant, and now holds the license for Mirena intrauterine system. The Population Council also publishes the journal Population and Development Review, which reports scientific research on the interrelationships between population and socioeconomic development. It also provides a forum for discussion on related issues of public policy and Studies in Family Planning, which focuses on public health, social science, and biomedical research involving sexual and reproductive health, fertility, and family planning.

== Organization ==
Established in 1952 by John D. Rockefeller III, with important funding from the Rockefeller Brothers Fund, the Council is governed by an international board of trustees. After many years of evolving, the 2006 council board includes leaders in many different fields. These include: biomedicine, business, economic development, government, health, international finance, media studies, philanthropy, and social science.

Headquartered in New York City, the Population Council has 18 offices in Africa, Asia, and Latin America and does work in more than 60 countries. With an annual budget of around $74 million, it employs nearly 400 people from 33 countries with expertise in a wide array of scientific disciplines. Roughly 55 percent are based outside the United States.

John D. Rockefeller III convened distinguished scientists in Williamsburg, Virginia, under the auspices of the National Academy of Sciences, to begin the search for a better understanding of demographic trends. Shortly thereafter, in 1952, he established the Population Council as an independent, nonprofit organization. He served as the Council's first president. Rockefeller eventually became non-executive chairman of the board, serving until his death in an auto accident in 1978.

Population Council presidents following Rockefeller are: Frederick Osborn (1957–1959), Frank Notestein (1959–1968), Bernard Berelson (1968–1974), George Zeidenstein (1977–1992), Margaret Catley-Carlson (1993–1999), Linda Martin (2000–2004), Peter J. Donaldson (2005–2015), Julia Bunting (2015–2023), interim co-Presidents Patricia C. Vaughan and James Sailer (2023-2024), and Rana Hajjeh (2024-2025). On May 15, 2025, Patricia C. Vaughan and James Sailer were appointed co-Presidents.

== Contraception ==
The Population Council conducts biomedical research to develop contraceptives and social science research to better understand the factors influencing access to and decision-making around contraceptives. Its research on reproductive and immunological processes serves, not only as the basis for the development of new contraceptive methods that reach out to both men and women, but also for new hormone therapies and AIDS-prevention products. The council is involved in a "collaboration with industry partner ProMed Pharma to develop innovative new vaginal rings that may make STI prevention more acceptable and effective for women."

In the 1960s, the Council played a key role in documenting the large numbers of people in poor countries who lacked access to contraceptives and in conducting research to design and evaluate public family planning programs. This included bringing IUDs to India. At this time, the Council's biomedical researchers worked to develop contraceptive methods, such as the intrauterine device. The council has found that fertility is "most sensitive to changes in the proportions married and prevalence of contraception." A country's ideas around reproduction out of wedlock, its accessibility, and the public's opinion of birth control are instrumental in the region's fertility.

An array of contraceptives available around the world today were developed by the Population Council, including: the Copper T Intrauterine device, Norplant, Jadelle (Norplant II), Mirena, and, in 2018, a one year contraceptive vaginal system called Annovera was approved by the US FDA. More than 50 million Copper T IUDs have been distributed in over 70 countries. Norplant was replaced by Jadelle, a two rod implant that provides contraception for five years.

The British medical journal Lancet said of the Population Council, "Most non-governmental organizations claim to promote change; the Population Council actually has hard evidence of having changed the lives and expectations of hundreds of millions of people."

== HIV prevention ==
The Population Council provides programs all over the world that aim to address the prevention and treatment of HIV infection. These programs help to develop new technologies and distribute them to marginalized populations, as well as educate people about HIV through workshops and mentorship services. For example, Empowering Girls and Young Women at High Risk of HIV Infection: A Capacity Strengthening Project is a project with locations in 15 different African countries that reaches girls and young women who have the highest risk of HIV transmission and provides them with resources to prevent it.

The Council is constantly conducting research to find high-risk populations and the most cost-effective ways to get them the treatment they lack. The Council partners in a project called Link Up that is based in Bangladesh, Burundi, Ethiopia, Myanmar, and Uganda, which focuses on the population of young people ages 10 to 24 who represent a large proportion of HIV infections. The Council's research and involvement in this project helped to implement more effective strategies for improving the sexual and reproductive health of these populations.

== Gender-based violence ==
The Council helps to alleviate the harmful effects of sexual and gender-based violence by offering education to both men and women about domestic violence and provide programs to help victims. Programs like "Opening Opportunities" help to develop the social networks of girls who are most at risk of being involved in sexual or gender based violence, and also connects them with mentors to help them stay safe.

== Public health data ==
The research that the Population Council conducts, and the publications it releases based on that research, contribute to the data that demographers and health officials require in order to promote public health. For instance, the Population Council was one of the first organizations to document statistics on HIV in Africa. The council also conducted the first study in India to assess the HIV risks that injecting drug users face. Their persistent efforts help to provide information about and combat public health disparities.

== See also ==
- Birth control movement in the United States
- Demography
- Sustainable development
- Rockefeller family
- Mifepristone (RU-486)
- Human overpopulation
