= Studies in Family Planning =

- Discipline: Sociology
- Language: English
- Edited by: Victoria Boydell, Mahesh Karra, and Francis Obare Onyango

Publication details
- History: 1963–present
- Publisher: Wiley-Blackwell on behalf of the Population Council
- Frequency: Quarterly
- Impact factor: 3.9 (2025)

Standard abbreviations
- ISO 4: Stud. Fam. Plan.
- NLM: Stud Fam Plann

Indexing
- ISSN: 0039-3665 (print); 1728-4465 (web)
- JSTOR: https://www.jstor.org/journal/studfamiplan

Links
- Journal homepage; Online access; Online archive

Studies in Family Planning is a quarterly peer-reviewed academic journal published by Wiley on behalf of the Population Council. The journal was established in 1963. Its current editors-in-chief are Victoria Boydell, Mahesh Karra, and Francis Obare Onyango. The journal publishes articles on public health, social science, and biomedical research on sexual and reproductive health, fertility, and family planning. Submissions of original research articles, reports, data papers, and commentaries are accepted. In 2018, the journal published a special online issue, The Evolution of Family Planning Programs, edited by John Bongaarts.

According to the Journal Citation Reports, the journal has a 2025 impact factor of 3.9, ranking it 2nd out of 51 journals in the category "Demography".
