= Earth Summit 2002 =

International conferens in Johannesburg, South Africa in August–September 2002

The World Summit on Sustainable Development 2002, took place in South Africa, from 26 August to 4 September 2002. It was convened to discuss sustainable development organizations, 10 years after the first Earth Summit in Rio de Janeiro. (It was therefore also informally nicknamed "Rio 10.")

== Declarations ==
The Johannesburg Declaration was the main outcome of the Summit; however, there were several other international agreements.

It laid out the Johannesburg Plan of Implementation as an action plan.

== Agreements ==
Johannesburg, 27 August: agreement was made to restore the world's depleted fisheries for 2015. It was agreed to by negotiators at the World Summit.

Instead of new agreements between governments, the Earth Summit was organized mostly around almost 300 "partnership initiatives" known as Type II, as opposed to Type I Partnerships which are the more classic outcome of international treaties. These were to be the key means to achieve the Millennium Development Goals. These are kept in a database of Partnerships for Sustainable Development.

== U.S. participation ==
The absence of the United States rendered the summit partially impotent. George W. Bush boycotted the summit and did not attend. Except for a brief appearance by Colin Powell, who hurriedly addressed the closing stages of the conference while his airplane taxied on the runway of Johannesburg International, the US government did not send a delegation, earning Bush praise in a letter from conservative organizations such as Americans for Tax Reform, American Enterprise Institute, and Competitive Enterprise Institute.

== History ==
The United Nations Conference on the Human Environment, was first held in Stockholm, Sweden, in June 1972, and marked the emergence of international environmental law. The Declaration on the Human Environment also known as the Stockholm Declaration set out the principles for various international environmental issues, including human rights, natural resource management, pollution prevention and the relationship between the environment and development. The conference also led to the creation of the United Nations Environment Programme.

The Brundtland Commission set up by Gro Harlem Brundtland, the pioneer of sustainable development, provided the momentum for first Earth Summit 1992 – the United Nations Conference on Environmental Development (UNCED), that was also headed by Maurice Strong, who had been a prominent member of the Brundtland Commission – and also for Agenda 21.

South Africa's first National Conference on Environment and Development entitled, "Ecologise Politics, Politicise Ecology" was held at the University of the Western Cape in conjunction with the Cape Town Ecology Group and the Western Cape Branch of the World Conference on Religion and Peace in 1991. Prominent persons involved in this conference were Ebrahim Rasool, Cheryl Carolus, Faried Esack, and Julia Martin.

The initial informal discussions on a possible new Summit in 2002 were held in February 1998 and hosted by Derek Osborn who co-chaired the preparatory meetings for Rio+5 and Stakeholder Forum for a Sustainable Future. A set of 10 governments started working informally to start putting together the possible agenda for a Summit. the non-papers produced in 1998 and 1999 ensured that when the UN Commission met in 2000 it could agree to host another Summit in 2002.

== See also ==
- Agenda 21
- Energy development
- Global Map
- Green energy
- Sustainability
- United Nations Conference on Sustainable Development, the follow-up conference in 2012
- United Nations Environment Programme
- United Nations Human Settlements Programme
- Women's Peace Train
