= Ernst Papanek =

Austrian-American child psychologist and educator (1900–1973)

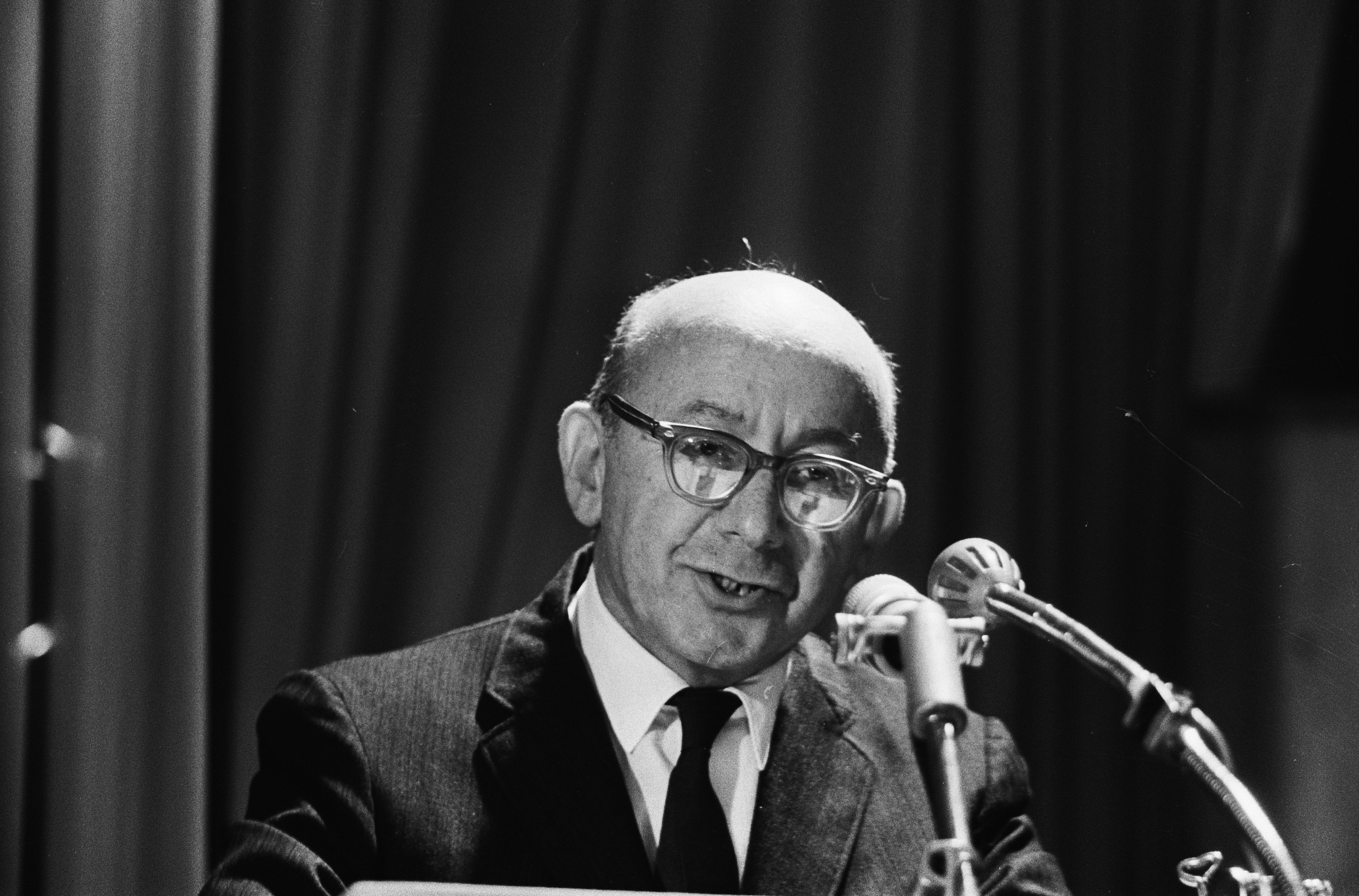
- Born: September 20, 1900; Vienna
- Died: August 5, 1973 (aged 72); Vienna
- Occupation(s): Educational psychologist, professor
- Spouse: Helene Papanek (m. 1925)
- Children: 2, including Gustav Fritz Papanek

Ernst Papanek (August 20, 1900 – August 5, 1973) was an Austrian American educational psychologist. Born to a Jewish family in Vienna, he advocated for refugee children before and after his 1940 emigration to the United States.

== Early life and education ==
Ernst Papanek was born in 1900 to a middle-class Jewish family in Vienna. His father, Johann Papanek, worked as a salesman while his mother, Rosa Papanek, worked as a tailor's assistant. Ernst lived with his parents and sisters Margarethe and Olga in the city's 6th district before moving to the 15th district in 1911.

Papanek was drawn to socialist ideals at a young age, joining the Free Association of Socialist Middle School Students and participating in the January Strike of 1918. After World War I, Papanek and his high school classmates formed an organization called Playmates to support child refugees from the conflict.

Papanek earned his high school diploma in 1919, the same year he joined the Social Democratic Workers' Party. He enrolled at the University of Vienna, but was too involved with Playmates to finish his intended medical degree. He reentered school and graduated with a philosophy degree from the university in 1927. He later studied at University of Paris and Teachers College, Columbia University.

== Career ==
Papanek was elected to the City Council of Vienna in April 1932. During the same period, he served as the Municipal Council Committee for Personnel Matters and Administrative Reform, where he oversaw the city's schools and childcare facilities.

Amidst the rise of the National Socialist party in Germany, Papanek acted as the chairman of the Austrian Socialist Workers’ Youth program, later known as the Revolutionary Socialist Youth (RSJ).

Papanek was forced into exile following the Austrian Civil War in 1934. In Brünn (present-day Brno), Papanek and other like-minded exiles formed the Foreign Office of the Austrian Social Democrats. He also represented the RSJ at the International Union of Socialist Youth under the pseudonym Ernst Pek.

In 1938, Papanek became leading director of the refugee children's homes established by the Organisation pour la Santé et l'Education (OSE) in France. After the Night of the Broken Glass, the organization's scope expanded from aiding only French children to helping children in other areas escape to France. The children were evacuated after the fall of Paris in June 1940. According to Papanek's account of his time with the OSE, 140 of the 320 children were eventually rescued.

Papanek emigrated to the United States in 1940. He assisted the Children's Aid Society as an educational consultant between 1943 and 1945. After World War II, he served as the director of child projects for the Unitarian Service Committee.

After a year as the executive director for the Brooklyn Training School for Girls, Papanek was appointed as the executive director of the Wiltwyck School for Boys in Esopus, New York in 1949.

From 1958 until his death, Papanek served as a professor of educational psychology at Queens College. He spent 1966 as a visiting professor at Hiroshima University.

In 1964, Papanek acted as the Socialist Party USA delegate to the Socialist International in Brussels. He was awarded the Golden Badge of the Association of Socialist Freedom Fighters and Victims of Fascism in 1970.

== Personal life ==
Papanek married Helene Papanek (née Goldstern) in June 1925, despite her father's resistance. The pair's first child, Gustav, was born the following year. Their second son, Georg, was born in 1931.

In the late 1930s, the family lived in France as Ernst and Helene worked together to house refugee Jewish children through their leadership in OSE. The family emigrated to the United States in 1940. At the time of his death, Helene and Ernst lived together in Manhattan.

== Death and legacy ==
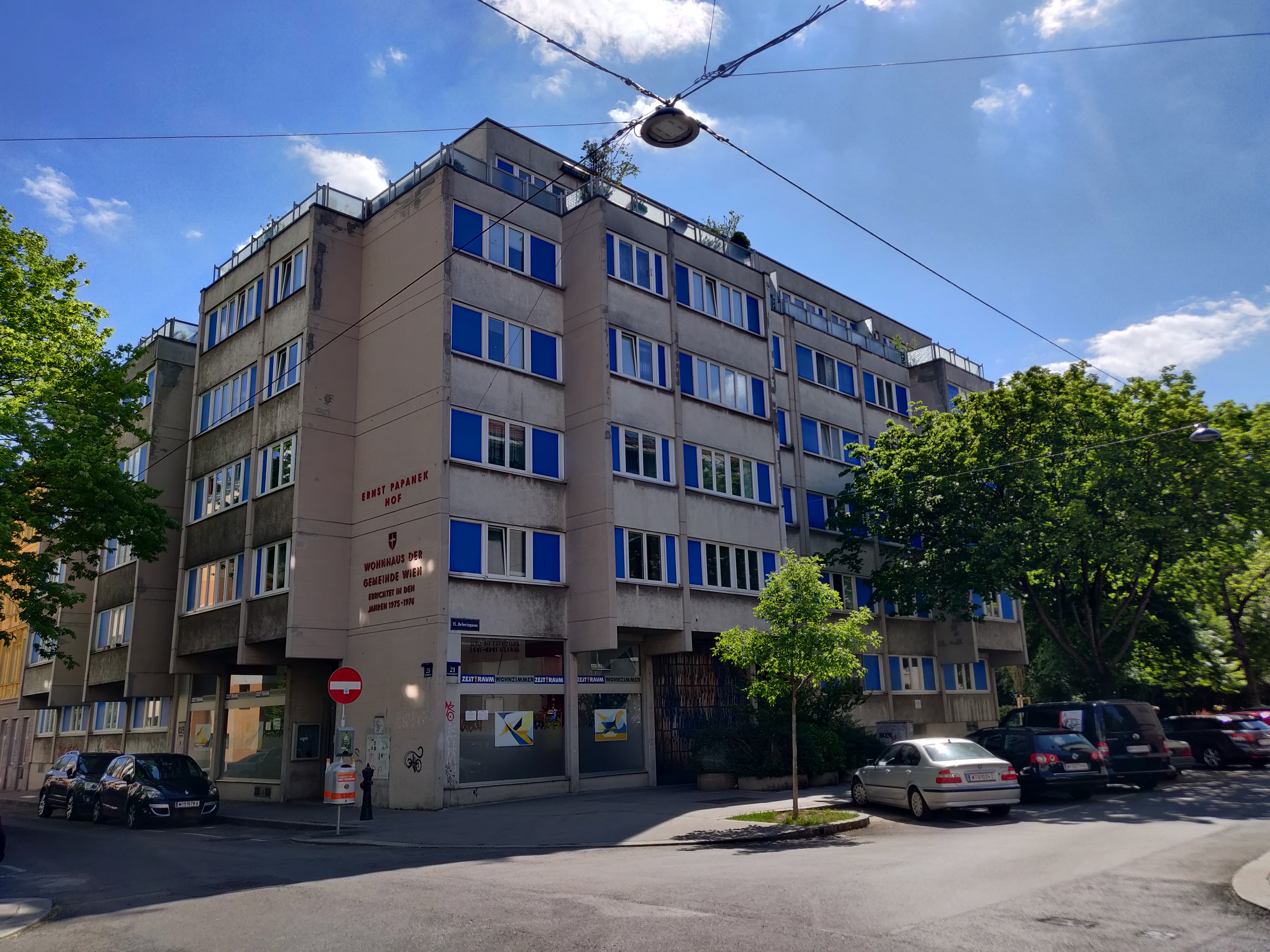
Exterior of the Ernst-Papanek-Hof building

Papanek died on August 20, 1973, during a visit to Vienna. Out of the Fire, his account of his work with the OSE, was released posthumously in 1975. Coauthored by Ed Linn, the book includes correspondences with survivors Papanek aided through the conflict.

A public housing complex in Vienna designed by Peter and Maria Tölzer is named for Papanek. Completed in 1976, the Enrst-Papanek-Hof complex features art by sculptor Alfred Kirchner and a plaque to Papanek near the entrance.
