= South African National Conference on Environment and Development =

The first National Conference on Environment and Development in South Africa was held at the University of the Western Cape during June/July 1991. It saw at least 231 representatives from a wide range of organisations discussing the links between environmental degradation and the political situation in Southern Africa.

== Report ==
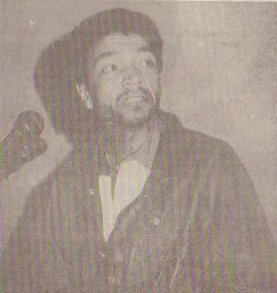
Zimbabwean Activist Yemi Katarere

The three-day conference, hosted by the Cape Town Ecology Group (CTEG) and the Western Cape branch of the World Conference on Religion and Peace (WCRP) and the Call of Islam aimed to "ecologise politics and politicise ecology". According to conference organiser, Phakamile Tshazibane, the conference represented a "breakthrough", since this was the "first time groups such as the Congress of South African Trade Unions (Cosatu), the National Council of Trade Unions (Nactu), the Pan Africanist Congress (PAC) and the African National Congress (ANC) found common ground around the issue of the environment."

There were also a wide range of religious groupings represented, from Hinduism to Judaism, as well as many people from rural areas such as Kuruman and Tuang. Although the conference opening was marred by the last-minute withdrawal of key international speaker Vandana Shiva due to ill-health, other international environmentalists filled the gap.

Bert von Pixteren of Friends of the Earth in the Netherlands told the conference that international environmental groupings had been wary of engaging with South African environmental organisations. However, political changes in the country had made participation possible. He cautioned against the attitude that environmentalists could continue their work without assisting the democratic process in the country.

Thobeka Thamage of the South African Women's Environmental Collective in London focused on environmental abuses affecting women around the world, and on the fact that many contraceptive methods endangered women's health. She also drew particular attention to environmental problems facing rural women in Africa, and to the fact that development programmes in the Southern African region had ignored the extra burden carried by women as a result of the migrant labour system employed by South African industry.

The need for "greater grassroots participation in the development decisions affecting people" was the message conveyed by Yemi Katare of the Zimbabwe Environmental Research Organisation (ZERO), who spoke about development problems in general and the lessons to be learnt from the Zimbabwean experience. Debate at the conference centred on issues such as the land question, with many delegates feeling that a new constitution would alleviate the inequalities that had resulted in land degradation in the homelands.

Solly Skosana of the PAC reiterated the view that land apartheid had not disappeared and that a constituent assembly was the only mechanism in which environmental concerns over land distribution would be able to be addressed. There was consensus among delegates that unequal land distribution was a major cause of environmental problems in South Africa and that the land itself needed protection under the law.

Speaking on behalf of the ANC, Cheryl Carolus criticised the lack of political involvement by environmentalists in the past and made the point that her decision to get involved in politics had arisen out of a desire to empower herself and to regain control over her environment.

The issue of workers' involvement in environmental issues was taken up by Nosey Peterse of the Food and Allied Workers Union (FAWU) who told delegates: "You can talk about environmental degradation but while you talk workers are losing their jobs because of environmental degradation."

"You cannot have a fishing industry without fish or agriculture without soil," said Peterse, who then added that a sustainable environment would mean thousands of jobs in the future. He urged delegates not to intellectualise about workers but rather to do something practical about the problem.

A statement adopted at the end of the conference declared: "A peaceful and just society can only be sustained if its ecological base is sound, and this means working with the people of the country striving for a democratic government and justice in access to land and the common wealth."

"Ecologically sound practices and projects can only succeed through grassroots participation where the people concerned retain control of those things that affect their lives."

Delegates agreed that full grassroots participation would have to involve a change in perception and values towards seeing "the interdependence of all living things". Inspiration for such values existed in "many religious and spiritual traditions, in particular African belief systems."

CTEG spokesperson Henri Laurie said the conference was significant in that people from backgrounds that were potentially divisive had shown a willingness to work together. "The amount of goodwill was remarkable and the delegates showed an enormous degree of solidarity on the environmental issue."

== See also ==
- World Summit on Sustainable Development
