= Gustav Fritz Papanek =

Austrian American economist (1926–2022)

- Born: July 12, 1926; Vienna
- Died: September 20, 2022 (aged 96); Lexington, Massachusetts
- Education: Cornell University; Harvard University
- Spouse: Hannah Papanek (née Kaiser)
- Children: 2
- Parent: Ernst Papanek

Gustav Fritz Papanek (July 12, 1926 – September 20, 2022) was an Austrian American development economist.

== Early life and education ==
Gustav Fritz Papanek was born July 12, 1926, to Ernst Papanek and Helene Papanek (née Goldstern). He was named for Gustav Mahler and Fritz Adler. Shortly after his birth, his parents moved to a Social Democratic housing development in Penzing, in the western part of Vienna.

Papanek's father was forced into exile following the Austrian Civil War of 1934. Following the Anschluss, the rest of the family fled to Paris in 1938. In September 1940, they emigrated by boat to New York City.

=== Military career ===
After graduating high school at age sixteen, Papanek enrolled at Cornell University. When the United States entered World War II, Papanek paused his studies to enlist in the army. He initially trained in the infantry and artillery, but eventually used his native German language skills in military intelligence. After training at Fort Ritchie in Maryland, he was deployed to Germany to find Nazi war criminals.

=== Education ===
Papanek resumed his studies at Cornell following his military service. After graduation, he earned both a master's degree and a PhD in economics from Harvard University, where he studied under John Kenneth Galbraith.

== Career ==
Papanek briefly served in the Agency for International Development within the US State Department before being fired for his socialist leanings. He briefly moved with his family to Karachi, Pakistan, before returning to a position at Harvard University in 1958.

At Harvard, Papanek studied income distribution and poverty in developing countries; he specialized in the economies of Indonesia and Pakistan. He also served as director of Harvard's Development Advisory Service.

In 1974, Papanek left Harvard to become the chair of economics at Boston University. He led the Boston Institute for Developing Economies for thirty years, advising governments on macroeconomic and microeconomic policies.

== Personal life ==
Papanek and his wife Hannah (née Kaiser) raised two children, Tom and Joanne.

== Works ==
- Pakistan's Development, Social Goals, and Private Incentives (1967), Cambridge, Mass: Harvard University Press. ISBN 9780674652002
- Development Policy: Theory and Practice (1968), based on work of the Harvard University Development Advisory Service, Cambridge, Mass: Harvard University Press. ISBN 9780674366954
- Decision Making for Economic Development: Text and Cases (1971), with Joseph J. Stern and Daniel M. Schydlowsky, Boston: Houghton Mifflin. ISBN 0395050367
- The Indonesian Economy (1980), New York: Praeger. ISBN 0030574293
- Lectures on Development Strategy, Growth, Equity, and the Political Process in Southern Asia (1986), with Syed Nawab Haider Naqvi, Islamabad: Pakistan Institute of Development Economics. OCLC 14631992
