= Agenda 21 =

1992 United Nations action plan

- Cover of the first edition (paperback)
- Author: United Nations (1992)
- Language: English, Chinese, Japanese, Russian, French, Spanish, Portuguese
- Genre: Non-fiction
- Publisher: United Nations
- Publication date: 23 April 1992 (34 years ago)
- Publication place: United States
- Media type: Print (Paperback), HTML, PDF
- Pages: 300 pp
- ISBN: 978-92-1-100509-7

Agenda 21 is a non-binding action plan of the United Nations with regard to sustainable development. It is a product of the Earth Summit (UN Conference on Environment and Development) held in Rio de Janeiro, Brazil, in June 1992. It is an action agenda for the UN, other multilateral organizations, and individual governments around the world that can be executed at local, national, and global levels. One major objective of the Agenda 21 initiative is that every local government should draw its own local Agenda 21. Its aim initially was to achieve global sustainable development by 2000, with the "21" in Agenda 21 referring to the original target of the 21st century. The plan has been the subject of conspiracy theories linking it to alleged plans for a New World Order.

== Structure ==
Agenda 21 is grouped into 4 sections:

- Section I: Social and Economic Dimensions is directed toward combating poverty, especially in developing countries, changing consumption patterns, promoting health, achieving a more sustainable population, and sustainable settlement in decision making.
- Section II: Conservation and Management of Resources for Development includes atmospheric protection, combating deforestation, protecting important environments, conservation of biological diversity (biodiversity), control of pollution and the management of biotechnology, and radioactive wastes.
- Section III: Strengthening the Role of Major Groups includes the roles of children and youth, women, NGOs, local authorities, business and industry, and workers; and strengthening the role of indigenous peoples, their communities, and farmers.
- Section IV: Means of Implementation includes science, technology transfer, education international institutions, and financial mechanisms.

== Development and evolution ==
The full text of Agenda 21 was made public at the UN Conference on Environment and Development (Earth Summit), held in Rio de Janeiro on 13 June 1992, where 178 governments voted to adopt the program. The final text was the result of drafting, consultation, and negotiation, beginning in 1989 and culminating at the two-week conference.

=== Rio+5 (1997) ===
In 1997, the UN General Assembly held a special session to appraise the status of Agenda 21 (Rio +5). The Assembly recognized progress as "uneven" and identified key trends, including increasing globalization, widening inequalities in income, and continued deterioration of the global environment. A new General Assembly Resolution (S-19/2) promised further action.

=== Rio+10 (2002) ===
The Johannesburg Plan of Implementation, agreed to at the World Summit on Sustainable Development (Earth Summit 2002), affirmed UN commitment to "full implementation" of Agenda 21, alongside achievement of the Millennium Development Goals and other international agreements.

=== Agenda 21 for culture (2002) ===
The first World Public Meeting on Culture, held in Porto Alegre, Brazil, in 2002, came up with the idea to establish guidelines for local cultural policies, something comparable to what Agenda 21 was for the environment. They are to be included in various subsections of Agenda 21 and will be carried out through a wide range of sub-programs beginning with G8 countries.

=== Rio+20 (2012) ===
In 2012, at the United Nations Conference on Sustainable Development the attending members reaffirmed their commitment to Agenda 21 in their outcome document called "The Future We Want". Leaders from 180 nations participated.

=== Sustainable Development Summit (2015) ===
Agenda 2030, also known as the Sustainable Development Goals, was a set of goals decided upon at the UN Sustainable Development Summit in 2015. It takes all of the goals set by Agenda 21 and re-asserts them as the basis for sustainable development, saying, "We reaffirm all the principles of the Rio Declaration on Environment and Development…" Adding onto those goals from the original Rio document, a total of 17 goals have been agreed on, revolving around the same concepts of Agenda 21; people, planet, prosperity, peace, and partnership.

== Implementation ==
The Commission on Sustainable Development acts as a high-level forum on sustainable development and has acted as preparatory committee for summits and sessions on the implementation of Agenda 21. The UN Division for Sustainable Development acts as the secretariat to the Commission and works "within the context of" Agenda 21.

Implementation by member states remains voluntary, and its adoption has varied.

=== Local level ===
The implementation of Agenda 21 was intended to involve action at international, national, regional and local levels. Some national and state governments have legislated or advised that local authorities take steps to implement the plan locally, as recommended in Chapter 28 of the document. These programs are often known as "Local Agenda 21" or "LA21". For example, in the Philippines, the plan is "Philippines Agenda 21" (PA21). The group, ICLEI-Local Governments for Sustainability, formed in 1990; today its members come from over 1,000 cities, towns, and counties in 88 countries and is widely regarded as a paragon of Agenda 21 implementation.

Europe turned out to be the continent where LA21 was best accepted and most implemented. In Sweden, for example, four small- to medium-sized municipalities in the south-east of Sweden were chosen for a 5-year study of their Local Agenda 21 (LA21) processes a Local Agenda 21 initiative.

== Regional levels ==
The UN Department of Economic and Social Affairs' Division for Sustainable Development monitors and evaluates progress, nation by nation, towards the adoption of Agenda 21, and makes these reports available to the public on its website.

The Rio+10 report identified over 6400 local governments in 113 countries worldwide that were engaged in Local Agenda 21 (LA21) activities, a more than three-fold increase over less than five years. 80% = 5120 of these local governments, were located in Europe. A significant increase has been noted in the number of countries in which one or more LA21 processes were underway.

=== Australia ===
Australia is a signatory to Agenda 21 and 88 of its municipalities subscribe to ICLEI, an organization that promotes Agenda 21 globally. Australia's membership is second only to that of the United States.

=== Africa ===
In Africa, national support for Agenda 21 is strong and most countries are signatories. But support is often closely tied to environmental challenges specific to each country; for example, in 2002 Sam Nujoma, who was then President of Namibia, spoke about the importance of adhering to Agenda 21 at the 2002 Earth Summit, noting that as a semi-arid country, Namibia sets a lot of store in the United Nations Convention to Combat Desertification (UNCCD). Furthermore, there is little mention of Agenda 21 at the local level in indigenous media. Only major municipalities in sub-Saharan African countries are members of ICLEI. Agenda 21 participation in North African countries mirrors that of Middle Eastern countries, with most countries being signatories but little to no adoption on the local-government level. Countries in sub-Saharan Africa and North Africa generally have poorly documented Agenda 21 status reports. By contrast, South Africa's participation in Agenda 21 mirrors that of modern Europe, with 21 city members of ICLEI and support of Agenda 21 by national-level government.

=== North America ===
==== United States ====
The national focal point in the United States is the Division Chief for Sustainable Development and Multilateral Affairs, Office of Environmental Policy, Bureau of Oceans and International Environmental and Scientific Affairs, U.S. Department of State. A June 2012 poll of 1,300 United States voters by the American Planning Association found that 9% supported Agenda 21, 6% opposed it, and 85% thought they didn't have enough information to form an opinion.

===== Support =====
The United States is a signatory country to Agenda 21, but because Agenda 21 is a legally non-binding statement of intent and not a treaty, the United States Senate did not hold a formal debate or vote on it. It is therefore not considered to be law under Article Six of the United States Constitution. President George H. W. Bush was one of the 178 heads of government who signed the final text of the agreement at the Earth Summit in 1992, and in the same year Representatives Nancy Pelosi, Eliot Engel and William Broomfield spoke in support of United States House of Representatives Concurrent Resolution 353, supporting implementation of Agenda 21 in the United States. Created by Executive Order 12852 in 1993, the President's Council on Sustainable Development (PCSD) is explicitly charged with recommending a national action plan for sustainable development to the President. The PCSD is composed of leaders from government and industry, as well as from environmental, labor and civil rights organizations. The PCSD submitted its report, "Sustainable America: A New Consensus", to the President in early 1996. In the absence of a multi-sectoral consensus on how to achieve sustainable development in the United States, the PCSD was conceived to formulate recommendations for the implementation of Agenda 21. Executive Order 12852 was revoked by Executive Order 13138 in 1999. The PCSD set 10 common goals to support the Agenda 21 movement:

1. Health and the environment
2. Economic Prosperity
3. Equity
4. Conservation of nature
5. Stewardship
6. Sustainable communities
7. Civic engagement
8. Population
9. International responsibility
10. Education.

In the United States, over 528 cities are members of ICLEI, an international sustainability organization that helps to implement the Agenda 21 and Local Agenda 21 concepts across the world. The United States has nearly half of the ICLEI's global membership of 1,200 cities promoting sustainable development at a local level. The United States also has one of the most comprehensively documented Agenda 21 status reports. In response to the opposition, Don Knapp, U.S. spokesman for the ICLEI, has said "Sustainable development is not a top-down conspiracy from the U.N., but a bottom-up push from local governments".

===== Opposition =====
Agenda 21 fears have played a role in opposition to local government's efforts to promote resource and land conservation, build bike lanes, and construct hubs for public transportation. The non-profit group ICLEI – Local Governments for Sustainability USA – was targeted by anti-Agenda 21 activists. In 2012, fears of Agenda 21 "went mainstream" when the Republican National Committee adopted a platform resolution stated that "We strongly reject the U.N. Agenda 21 as erosive of American sovereignty."

Several state and local governments have considered or passed motions and legislation opposing Agenda 21. Most such bills failed, "either dying in committee, getting defeated on the statehouse floor or – in the case of Missouri's 2013 bill – getting vetoed by the governor." In Texas, for example, broadly worded legislation that would prohibit any governmental entity from accepting from or granting money to any "nongovernmental or intergovernmental organization accredited by the United Nations to implement a policy that originated in the Agenda 21 plan" was defeated because it could have cut off funding for groups such as 4-H, the Boy Scouts of America, and the Texas Wildlife Association. In Arizona, a similarly sweeping bill was introduced in the Arizona State Legislature seeking to mandate that the state could not "adopt or implement the creed, doctrine, or principles or any tenet" of Agenda 21 and to prohibit the state "implementing programs of, expending any sum of money for, being a member of, receiving funding from, contracting services from, or giving financial or other forms of aid to" an array of sustainability organizations. The bill, which was opposed by the state chamber of commerce and the mayor of Phoenix, was defeated in 2012. Alabama was one state that did adopt an anti-Agenda 21 law, unanimously passing in 2012 a measure to block "any future effort to 'deliberately or inadvertently infringe or restrict private property rights without due process, as may be required by policy recommendations originating in, or traceable to 'Agenda 21.'"

In 2023, Tennessee enacted legislation to block the implementation of Agenda 21 and other programs "originating in, or traceable to, the United Nations or a subsidiary entity of the United Nations."

=== Europe ===
The Rio+10 report identified 5120 of local governments in Europe having a "Local Agenda 21". As most Europeans live in about 800 cities of +50.000 inhabitants, it is fair to say that just about all EU cities, communes and villages have a local Agenda 21.

For example:

By 1997, 70% of UK local authorities had committed to Agenda 21. Many, such as the London Borough of Enfield, employed Agenda 21 officers to promote the programme.

Sweden reported that 100% of the municipalities had adopted LA21 by 2002.

France, whose national government, along with 14 cities, is a signatory, promotes nationwide programs in support of the goals of Agenda 21.

Baltic nations formed the Baltic 21 coalition as a regional expression of Agenda 21.

== Conspiracy theories ==
The right-wing John Birch Society described Agenda 21 as a plot, disguised as an environmental movement, to end individual freedom and establish a one-world government. Activists believed that the non-binding UN resolution was "the linchpin in a plot to subjugate humanity under an eco-totalitarian regime." The conspiracy had its roots in anti-environmentalist ideology and opposition to land-use regulation.

Anti-Agenda 21 theories have circulated in the U.S. Some Tea Party movement activists and others promoted the notion that Agenda 21 was part of a UN plot to deny property rights, undermine U.S. sovereignty, or force citizens to move to cities.

Glenn Beck warned that Agenda 21 was a "seditious" conspiracy to cut the world population by 85%. He claimed it represents a move towards "government control on a global level" and the creation of a "police state" that would lead to "totalitarianism." Beck described the dystopia it would cause if the world followed the UN plan in a 2012 novel he co-authored called Agenda 21.

Conspiracy theories related to Agenda 21 have also surfaced in Canada, Australia, Ireland, and other countries. They were given a boost by the 2020 coronavirus pandemic.

== See also ==
- Commission on Sustainable Development
- Ecologically sustainable development
- EarthCheck
- Global Map
- Glocalization
- Man and the Biosphere Programme
- Sustainable development goals (aka Agenda 2030)
- Think globally, act locally
- Waste management
- Our Common Future

== Bibliography ==
- Lenz, Ryan (Spring 2012). "Antigovernment Conspiracy Theorists Rail Against UN's Agenda 21 Program". Intelligence Report (145). Southern Poverty Law Center.
- Earth Summit 2012
