= Earth Summit =

1992 United Nations conference

United Nations Conference on Environment and Development
- Date: 3–14 June 1992
- Location: Rio de Janeiro, Brazil
- Also known as: Rio de Janeiro Conference; Earth Summit
- Participants: 108 heads of state and government
- Outcome: Establishment of the United Nations Framework Convention on Climate Change (UNFCCC)

The Earth Summit was a UN event.

The United Nations Conference on Environment and Development (UNCED), also known as the Rio de Janeiro Conference or the Earth Summit (Portuguese: ECO92, Cúpula da Terra), was a major United Nations conference held in Rio de Janeiro from 3 to 14 June 1992.

The Rio conference was attended by 108 heads of state and government, and helped establish and disseminate the concept of sustainable development.

A key achievement of the 1992 conference was the establishment of the United Nations Framework Convention on Climate Change (UNFCCC) established in part as an international environmental treaty to combat "dangerous human interference with the climate system" and to stabilize greenhouse gas concentrations in the atmosphere. It was signed by 154 states at the United Nations Conference on Environment and Development (UNCED). By 2022, the UNFCCC had 198 parties. Its supreme decision-making body, the Conference of the Parties (COP) meets annually to assess progress in dealing with climate change.

Since the creation of the UNFCC many related environmental conferences, climate-related forums, and ongoing scientific research initiatives in the fields of sustainability, climate, and environmental security have continued to develop these intersecting issues. Non-governmental organizations (NGOs) and educational institutions have been prominent participants.

The Earth Summit played an influential role in diffusing several key principles of environmental treaties, such as the precautionary principle, common but differentiated responsibilities, and the polluter pays principle.

== Background ==
The 1972 United Nations Conference on the Human Environment (UNCHE) or the Stockholm Conference, was the first global conference to address environmental issues. It took place in Stockholm, Sweden from 5 to 16 June 1972.

Earth Summit was created as a means for member states to cooperate together internationally on development issues after the Cold War. Due to issues relating to sustainability being too big for individual member states to handle, Earth Summit was held as a platform for other member states to collaborate.

== Issues addressed ==
The issues addressed include:

- systematic scrutiny of patterns of production—particularly the production of toxic components, such as lead in gasoline, or poisonous waste including radioactive chemicals
- alternative sources of energy to replace the use of fossil fuels which delegates linked to global climate change
- new reliance on public transportation systems in order to reduce vehicle emissions, congestion in cities and the health problems caused by polluted air and smoke
- the growing usage and limited supply of water
- importance of protecting the world's oceans.

== Development ==
An important achievement of the summit was an agreement on the Climate Change Convention, which in turn led to the Kyoto Protocol and the Paris Agreement. Another agreement was to "recognize that indigenous lands need to be protected from environmentally unsound activities, and from activities the people consider to be socially and culturally inappropriate".

The Convention on Biological Diversity was opened for signature at the Earth Summit and made a start towards a redefinition of measures that did not inherently encourage the destruction of natural ecoregions and so-called uneconomic growth. World Oceans Day was initially proposed at this conference and has been recognized since then.

Although President George H. W. Bush signed the Earth Summit's Convention on Climate, his EPA Administrator William K. Reilly acknowledges that U.S. goals at the conference were difficult to negotiate and the agency's international results were mixed, including the U.S. failure to sign the proposed Convention on Biological Diversity.

Twelve cities were also honored with the Local Government Honours Award for innovative local environmental programs. These included Sudbury in Canada for its ambitious program to rehabilitate environmental damage from the local mining industry, Austin in the United States for its green building strategy, and Kitakyūshū in Japan for incorporating an international education and training component into its municipal pollution control program.

The Earth Summit resulted in the following documents:

- Rio Declaration on Environment and Development
- Agenda 21
- Forest Principles

Moreover, important legally binding agreements (Rio Convention) were opened for signature:

- Convention on Biological Diversity
- Framework Convention on Climate Change (UNFCCC)

At Rio it was agreed that an International Negotiating Committee for a third convention the United Nations Convention to Combat Desertification would be set up. This convention was negotiated within two years of Rio and then open for signature. It became effective in 1996 after receiving 50 ratifications.

In order to ensure compliance to the agreements at Rio (particularly the Rio Declaration on Environment and Development and Agenda 21), delegates to the Earth Summit established the Commission on Sustainable Development (CSD). In 2013, the CSD was replaced by the High-level Political Forum on Sustainable Development that meets every year as part of the ECOSOC meetings, and every fourth year as part of the General Assembly meetings.

Critics point out that many of the agreements made in Rio have not been realized regarding such fundamental issues as fighting poverty and cleaning up the environment. Malaysia was successful at blocking the US-proposed convention on forests and its prime-minister Mahathir Mohamad accused later the global North of exercising eco-imperialism at this summit. According to Vandana Shiva, Earth Summit create a "moral base for green imperialism".

In 2013, the Geneva-based organization Green Cross International was founded to build upon the work of the Summit.

The first edition of Water Quality Assessments, published by WHO/Chapman & Hall, was launched at the Rio Global Forum.

== Youth ==
At this stage, youth were not officially recognised within climate governance. Although youth were not given specific recognition, there was a significant youth turnout at UNCED. Youth were involved in negotiating Chapter 25 of Agenda 21 on Children & Youth in Sustainable Development.

"25.2 It is imperative that youth from all parts of the world participate actively in all relevant levels of decision-making processes because it affects their lives today and has implications for their futures. In addition to their intellectual contribution and their ability to mobilize support, they bring unique perspectives that need to be taken into account."

Two years prior to UNCED youth organized internationally to prepare for the Earth Summit. Youth concerns were consolidated at a World Youth Environmental Meeting, Juventud (Youth) 92, held in Costa Rica, before the Earth Summit.

"The involvement of today's youth in environment and development decision-making...is critical to the long term success of Agenda 21" (UNCED 1992).

Parallel to UNCED, youth organized the Youth '92 conference with participation from around the world. Organising took place before, but also afterwards. Many youth participants were dissatisfied with the rate of change.

== See also ==
- Earth Summits - list of the other summits before and after Rio 1992 (the first one in 1972)
- Global Map
- Maurice Strong
- Precautionary principle
- Regional Forum on Environment and Health in Southeast and East Asian countries
- Severn Suzuki
- The Environmental Institute
- Tommy Koh - link to the Chairman of the Main Committee of the UN Conference on Environment and Development
- United Nations Conference on the Human Environment 1972
- United Nations Climate Change conference - a yearly summit held in the framework of the United Nations Framework Convention on Climate Change (UNFCCC)
