= Green Party of South Africa =

Political party in South Africa

- Founded: 1999
- Headquarters: Noordhoek, Cape Town, South Africa
- Ideology: Environmentalism
- Political position: Centre
- International affiliation: Federation of Green Parties of Africa

Website
- greenpartyofsouthafrica.co.za

The Green Party of South Africa (GPSA) was a small political party in the Western Cape province. It is a member of the Federation of Green Parties of Africa.

== History of Green politics in South Africa ==
The Ecology Party was established in November 1989, but disbanded after recruiting only 1 800 members.

Ian Brownlie launched the Green Party (GRP) in July 1992, but it too disbanded after failing to win a seat in the Western Cape Provincial legislature during the 1994 Provincial and National general elections under the leadership of Nathan Grant.

Judy Sole founded the Government by the People Green Party (GPGP) in 1999, which she later renamed to The Green Party of South Africa. The party has contested elections as the Green Party of South Africa since the 2000 local elections. Due to the lack of funding the Green Party of South Africa only participated in the 2004 provincial elections but was reconstituted in early February 2019 to contest the provincial elections.

== Election results ==
Year	National		Western Cape provincial		City of Cape Town				References
Year	National		Western Cape provincial		Ward		Proportional		References
1994			2 611	0.1%					
1999	9 193	0.06%	2 453	0.15%					
2000					477	0.07%	1 973	0.28%	
2004			3 317	0.21%					

=== Provincial elections ===
Election	Eastern Cape		Free State		Gauteng		Kwazulu-Natal		Limpopo		Mpumalanga		North-West		Northern Cape		Western Cape	
Election	%	Seats	%	Seats	%	Seats	%	Seats	%	Seats	%	Seats	%	Seats	%	Seats	%	Seats
1994	-	-	-	-	-	-	-	-	-	-	-	-	-	-	-	-	0.1%	0/42
1999	-	-	-	-	-	-	-	-	-	-	-	-	-	-	-	-	0.15%	0/42
2004	-	-	-	-	-	-	-	-	-	-	-	-	-	-	-	-	0.21%	0/42
2019	-	-	-	-	-	-	-	-	-	-	-	-	-	-	-	-	0.13%	0/42

== See also ==
- eThekwini ECOPEACE
- Green movement in South Africa
