= Environmental movement in South Africa =

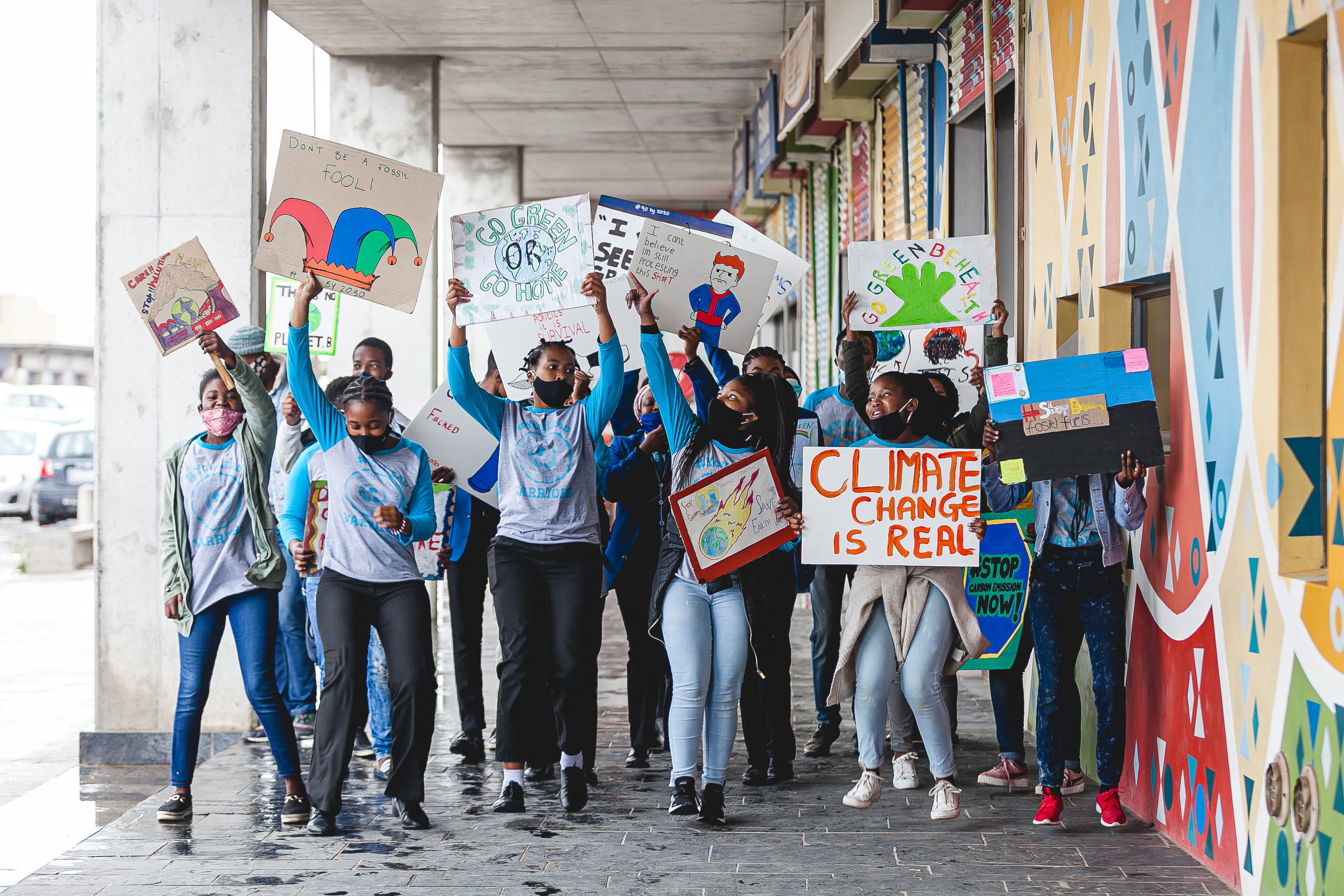
South African youth climate activists in 2020

The environmental movement in South Africa traces its history from the beginnings of conservation and preservation groups in the late 19th century, to the rise of radicalism amongst local ecologists and activists. The early environmental movement in South Africa was primarily made up of conservation groups whose membership was dominated by affluent whites. Many of these groups advocated for forms of fortress conservation that were used to justify forcibly removing Black South Africans from their land. Throughout the mid to late 20th century, justice-centered environmental groups sprung up in connection with anti-apartheid movements advocating for change on issues that affected the environment as well as the rights of workers and rural peoples, showing how environmental issues in the country were "inextricably linked to issues of race and politics."

== Issues ==
Since the early days of the environmental movement, protection of wildlife and natural landscapes has been a major area of focus, however as the environmental movement has become more justice-focused, it has shifted from advocating for fortress conversation policies to endorsing community-based conservation strategies, which have been implemented in some areas with varying degrees of efficacy. Historically, many key environmental issues in the country were not explicitly framed as environmental issues by social movements, but rather as issues of "service delivery," which encompass the provision of housing, water, sanitation, and electricity services by national and municipal governments. Some environmental groups have addressed the intersections between the environment, urban living conditions, and occupational health and safety. Environmental movements in the country have also increasingly focused on combatting climate change and making decarbonization, sustainable development, and climate justice political priorities in the country.

=== Mining ===
Mining is one of the major industries in South Africa. In 2023, the country was the world's largest producer of chromium, manganese, platinum, vanadium and vermiculite, and is the second largest producer of ilmenite, palladium, rutile and zirconium. In 2021, it was also the world's fifth largest coal producer. While native peoples in the region had been harvesting and trading gold and other minerals for centuries, industrialized mining began in the late 19th century driven by the governments and companies of the South African Republic and the Transvaal Colony. These new mines employed a primarily Black workforce, shifting the Native population from relying on subsidence agriculture for their livelihoods to becoming dependent on wage labor. Working conditions in mines were dangerous with exposure to environmental hazards such as rock bursts and an extremely and hot poorly ventilated conditions. Tuberculosis was also able to spread easily among mine workers due to the poor ventilation. Asbestos mining caused severe lung damage to miners and surrounding communities. Sulfuric acid from mines also leads to pollution of surrounding groundwater, which for many communities is an important drinking water source.

=== Energy supply ===
South Africa's energy supply crisis, or load shedding, is an ongoing period of widespread national blackouts of electricity supply. It began in the later months of 2007 towards the end of Thabo Mbeki's second term as president, and continues through the present. The South African government-owned national power utility and primary power generator, Eskom, and various parliamentarians attributed these rolling blackouts to insufficient generation capacity.

The blackouts have had a wide range of impact on residents including limiting hospital services, increasing food insecurity and water scarcity, and increasing unemployment rates. The issue is connected to debates surrounding climate change and the country's transition to renewable energy since the majority of the nation's electricity currently comes from coal fire power plants. Bureaucratic delays and corruption have delayed the transition to renewables, worsening the power supply crisis.

=== Water access ===
Inequitable water and sanitation access have long been issues in South Africa. Amid droughts exacerbated by climate change, the country currently faces a water crisis. The situation is especially dire for rural populations, 19% of whom lack consistent access to water and 33% of whom lack access to basic sanitation services. Although the right to water is a guaranteed under the law, this often not the case on the ground. In 2000, water distribution was decentralized and is now controlled by municipal governments, which makes it more difficult for those outside larger municipalities to be connected to water infrastructure. This change did lead to a net increase in the number of people with access to water infrastructure, with the number increasing by 20.8 million between 1994 and 2020. However significant problems remain with the water system including broken or failing infrastructure, a lack of upkeep, and corruption in municipal governments. A notable example occurred in Mothutlung, a township in the North West Province, in 2013 when water tanks were brought in to deal with disruption of water supplies to households. Residents continually complained to local officials, but no action was taken, before they eventually discovered that municipal officials were deliberately delaying the repairs because they were shareholders in the water tank company being paid by the municipality. Protests ensued, and 4 protesters were killed by police.

== Key environmental justice organizations ==
While the environmental movement in South Africa has long operated in decentralized manner, three environmental justice organizations: groundWork South Africa, Earthlife Africa, and the Coalition for Environmental Justice have served as important hubs for organizers and played a role in shaping the direction of the movement. Many environmental NGOs have had to compete with each other for funding, especially amid a scarcity in international funding, although in recent years there have been efforts among environmental organizations to pool their resources, financial and otherwise. The ideological gap has also begun to close between traditional environmental organizations and environmental justice organizations as a response to critiques that conservationist movements were too elitist and did not address issues of concern to the majority of the population.

=== Earthlife Africa ===
Earthlife Africa (ELA) is a South African environmental and anti-nuclear organisation founded in August 1988, in Johannesburg. Drawing inspiration from Greenpeace International, they sought to politicize conservation and connect it to other social inequalities. The group addressed environmental issues began by playing a radical, anti-apartheid, activist role. ELA is arguably now more of a reformist lobby or pressure group. As a key voice in the environmental justice movement, Earthlife Africa has been criticized for being too radical, and by others for "working with traditional conservation movements" in furthering the environmental struggle.

=== Coalition for Environmental Justice (formerly the Environmental Justice Networking Forum) ===
Born out of an ELA conference in 1992, the Environmental Justice Networking Forum (EJNF) quickly became a prominent force in the environmental justice movement, taking on initiatives such as fighting against hazardous waste facilities in poor communities, While the EJNF had success mobilizing rural populations, especially during the late 1990s and early 2000s, the organization was criticized by some for ignoring the pressing environmental justice issues facing urban communities. In 2006, it reestablished as the Coalition for Environmental Justice.

=== groundWork South Africa ===
As South Africa's local affiliate of Friends of the Earth, groundWork South Africa was established in 1999 by three former EJNF members. Their primary areas of focus are renewable energy and environmental health. They aim to address environmentalism through the lens of social equality and the creation of a more egalitarian society, focusing on addressing the needs of vulnerable populations. They both partner with local community organizations and conduct legislative advocacy.

== Politics ==
During apartheid, environmental groups served as an outlet for activism and political expression, as many kinds of political parties were banned. After the end of apartheid, many radical environmentalists were absorbed into the governing African National Congress (ANC), while some chose to continue pursuing activism or advocacy through non-governmental organizations. During Nelson Mandela's presidency (1994–1999) there were higher levels of cooperation between environmental non-governmental organizations and national government, but during the Thabo Mbeki presidency (1999–2008) tensions arose between environmental groups and the ANC. Mbeki favored non-governmental organizations that focused on delivering direct aid to struggling populations, whereas environmental movements were focused on pursuing social and political change. Lack of transparency and public participation in government decision making remain a source of conflict between environmental organizations and political officials.

=== Green parties ===
Unlike many Global North countries which saw large movements for the establishment of green parties beginning in the 1970s, the movement to establish a green party in South Africa in the late 1980s and early 1990s never reached mainstream success. Several green parties were started in the country during that period, although none became influential in national politics. In 1989, the Ecology Party, the country's first green party was established, but it disbanded shortly thereafter. In 1992, activists in Capetown launched the Green Party, but it too disbanded after a disastrous election campaign in 1994. Judy Sole, a nature resort developer, then founded the Government of the People Green Party in 1999. ECOPEACE, a socialist environmentalist party founded in 1995 won a seat on the eThekwini Municipal Council in 2000, and its sister organization, Operation Khanyisa Movement (OKM) won a seat on the Johannesburg City Council in 2006.

=== National legislation ===
South Africa's Constitution, ratified in 1996, enshrines the right to a safe and healthy environment, and the right of future generations to have a protected environment though conservation and the curbing of pollution. It also commits to restitution of land rights.

Two pieces of landmark environmental legislation, the Environmental Management Act and the National Water Act, both passed in 1998. The Reconstruction and Development Programme (RDP), which passed in 1994 promised increased service delivery that would meet the needs of all people. However, in a few short years, the RDP would be replaced with Growth, Employment, and Redistribution (GEAR) which was more focused on economic growth than addressing social issues.

=== International agreements ===
In 2002, South Africa hosted the Rio+10 World Summit on Sustainable Development which was held in Johannesburg, the main outcome of which was the Johannesburg declaration. In the lead up to the event, there was conflict among environmental organizations about whether hosting the summit was a valuable endeavor or whether it was a distraction from pressing domestic environmental policy concerns.

== Timeline ==
Green Pages

=== Colonial Era ===
- 1652: A waystation at Cape Town is established by the Dutch East India Company, later becoming part of the Dutch Cape Colony.
- 1795 & 1806: The British Empire occupied what would become the British Cape Colony.
- 1856: The government of the Cape Colony passed the Forest and Herbage Preservation Act. Knysna forest and Tsitsikama forest were designated as nature preserves.
- 1867: Diamonds discovered in the Northern Cape.
- 1883: The Natal Game Association, a group focused on the conservation of wildlife was founded. It was the first known non-governmental organization in South Africa that focused on environmental issues.
- 1910: Union of South Africa established by the joining of four British colonies in South Africa.
- 1912: African National Congress established to oppose the exclusion of Black South Africans from holding positions of power in the colonial government.
- 1918: Native Farmers Association founded.
- 1926: Wildlife Society of South Africa founded. Kruger National Park, the first national park in South Africa, was established.

=== Apartheid Era ===
- 1948: Apartheid regime implemented by the National Party. This included environmental apartheid, the deliberate placement of Black South Africans in rural areas with harsh environmental conditions where it was difficult to access necessities such as food, water, and social services.
- 1955: Congress of the People (1955), a meeting of anti-apartheid activists and organizations, was held at Kliptown. The Freedom Charter adopted at the meeting includes article on agrarian & environmental rights, including 'save the soil'.
- 1973: Endangered Wildlife Trust founded
- 1976: Koeberg Alert founded following the decision to site South Africa's first nuclear power station only 30 kilometres (19 miles) from Cape Town
- 1977: The Dolphin Action & Protection Group founded with the motto and policy 'Dolphins Should Be Free'.
- 1983: Koeberg Alert reconstituted, "broadens the focus of the protest" to place the entire nuclear issue "within its social, political and economic context."
- 1984: The Naturalist Society, also known as Natsoc founded.
- 1987: Cape Town Ecology Group founded; with motto: 'Free the Humans'
- 1988: Earthlife Africa formed; Khanyisa, environmental awareness organisation founded in townships of Langa, Nyanga, Guguletu and Khayelitsha
- 1989: Earthlife Africa exposes mercury poisoning of workers at Thor Chemicals; Kagenna Magazine is published; Green Action Forum founded by Greg Knill. Establishment of the Ecology Party in Cape Town.
- 1990: A fishing industry campaign by the Food and Allied Workers Union links workers issues to the environment.
- 1991: First National Conference on Environment and Development; Environmental Monitoring Group releases a document "Towards Sustainable Development in South Africa"; Bev Geach of the Weekly Mail publishes The Green Pages, a directory of environmental groups.
- 1992: Earthlife Africa pressurizes the government for an inquiry into asbestos related deaths. Environmental Justice Networking Forum (EJNF) formed at an ELA conference. Establishment of the Green Party by activists in Cape Town.
- 1993: Group for Environmental Monitoring (GEM) founded.

=== Post-Apartheid Era ===
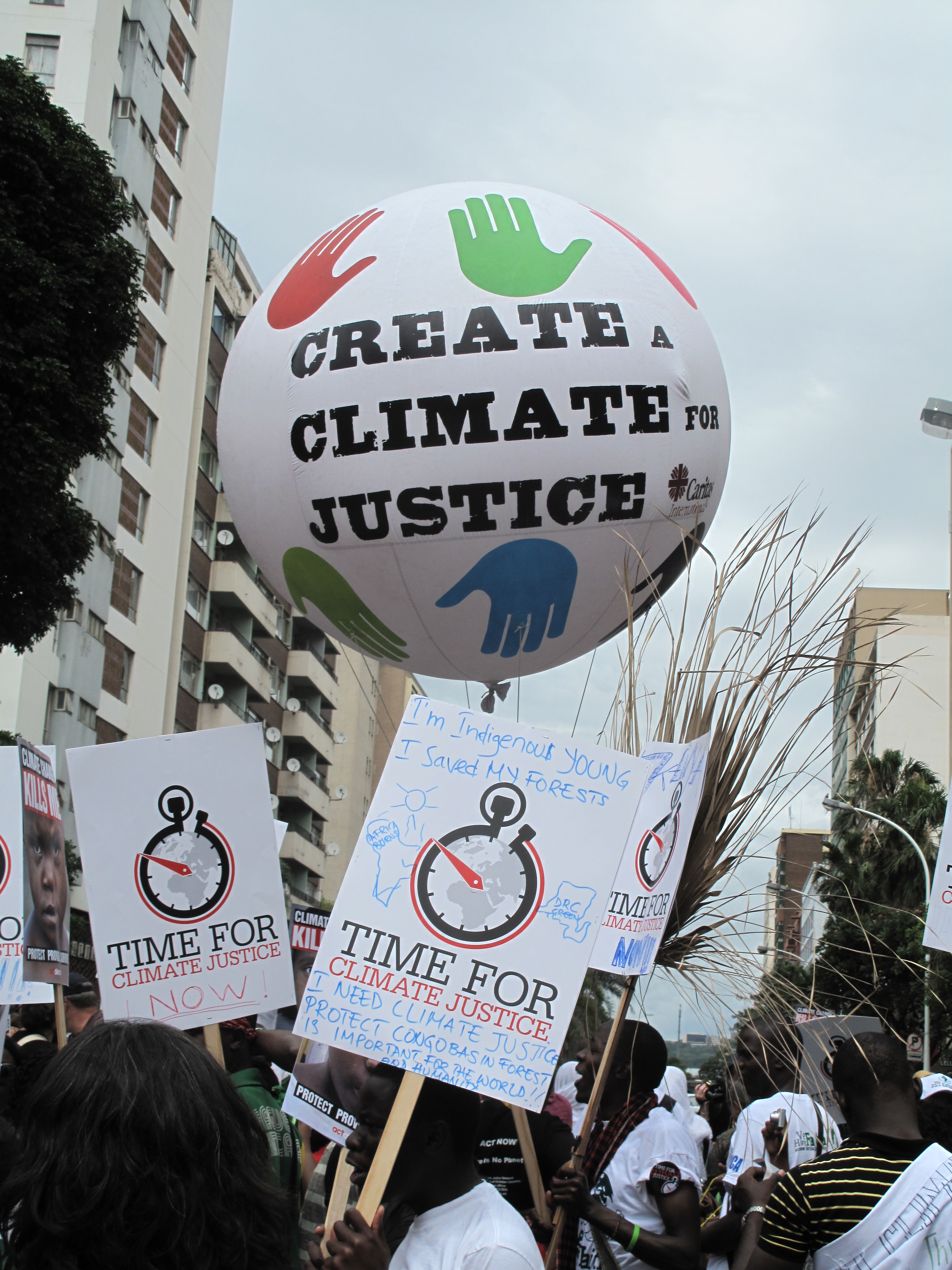
Climate change protesters in Durban participate in the 2011 Global Day of Action.

- 1994: After South Africa's first democratic election, environmental rights submitted for debate to the Constitutional Assembly.
- 1995: eThekwini ECOPEACE, an environmentalist political party now known as ECOPEACE founded.
- 1996: South Africa's Bill of Rights proclaims: "Everyone has the right to an environment that is not harmful to their health or well-being."
- 1996: Lead-free petrol is introduced in the market.
- 1997: The Truth and Reconciliation Commission hears evidence that asbestos mining companies suppressed research on asbestos-related health risks in the 1960s and 1970s. The research found a significant risk of asbestosis and death related to asbestos mining in the Northern Cape.
- 1998: National Water Act passes, based on the concept of integrated water resources management (IWRM).
- 1999: groundWork (GW), a non-profit, environmental justice service and development organization founded. Founding of the Government by the People Green Party by Judy Sole.
- 2000: South Durban Community Environmental Alliance (SDCEA) formed; eThekwini ECOPEACE wins one seat in the eThekwini Municipal Council, the first time a Green Party of any sort in South Africa has won at the polls
- 2002: Rio+10 World Summit on Sustainable Development held in Johannesburg; Earthlife launches the People's Environmental Centre, the Greenhouse.
- 2003: Asbestos Relief Trust (ART) set up, and the Kgalagadi Relief Trust (KRT), both of which evaluate claims and provide compensation for qualified claimants. A media statement, indicates that the ban on the use of asbestos and asbestos-related materials was "well overdue." National Energy Caucus founded.
- 2006: Adding lead to petrol is outlawed, following earlier regulations on catalytic converters and emission levels in many types of vehicles.
- 2006: Eskom, South Africa's national energy utility issues energy-saving lightbulbs to consumers as part of a "demand-side" energy-reduction campaign. EJNF reconstitutes as the Coalition for Environmental Justice.
  - Dept of Environmental Affairs and Tourism holds hearings on nuclear power. First evidence of contamination and worker-related deaths caused by exposure to radiation.
- 2008: A ban on asbestos takes effect, with strictly controlled, narrow exceptions.
- 2009: South Africa participates in the Copenhagen Climate Change round.
- 2010: SA Government announces mothballing of the pebble bed modular reactor project due to an inability of the project's company to obtain private investment or a customer for its technology. The plan to site a modular reactor at Koeberg was a key issue for Koeberg Alert.
- 2011: South Africa hosts COP17 in Durban, a new framework emerges. Allied Climate & Health Conference releases "Durban Declaration" declaring a health emergency, signed by 250 medical professionals and public health organisations.
- 2015: South Africa hosts International Renewable Energy Conference.
- 2016: Vukani Environmental Justice Movement formed in Mpumalanga Province. Establishment of The Greens in Cape Town.
- 2017: The High Court of South Africa rules against government plans to build a coal fired power station at Waterberg. This is a result of a lawsuit by Earthlife Africa. In the judgement, the court ruled that because "climate change impacts of coal-fired power stations are relevant factors that must be considered before granting environmental authorisation" and that this wasn't sufficiently done, the court reviewed and set aside the Minister's decision.
- 2019: The Government by the People Green Party participated in the 2019 National and Provincial Elections and obtained 0.13% of the vote in the Western Cape Province, but no parliamentary seat.
- 2019: In June, a Carbon Tax Act passed earlier in the year commences.
- 2021: The Greens contested the Local Government Elections in Cape Town but did not secure a seat in the council.
- 2022: March, "Deadly Air" case decided in the High Court of South Africa, confirming a constitutional right of the country's citizens to an environment that isn't harmful to their health. This includes the right to clean air, as exposure to air pollution affects human health.

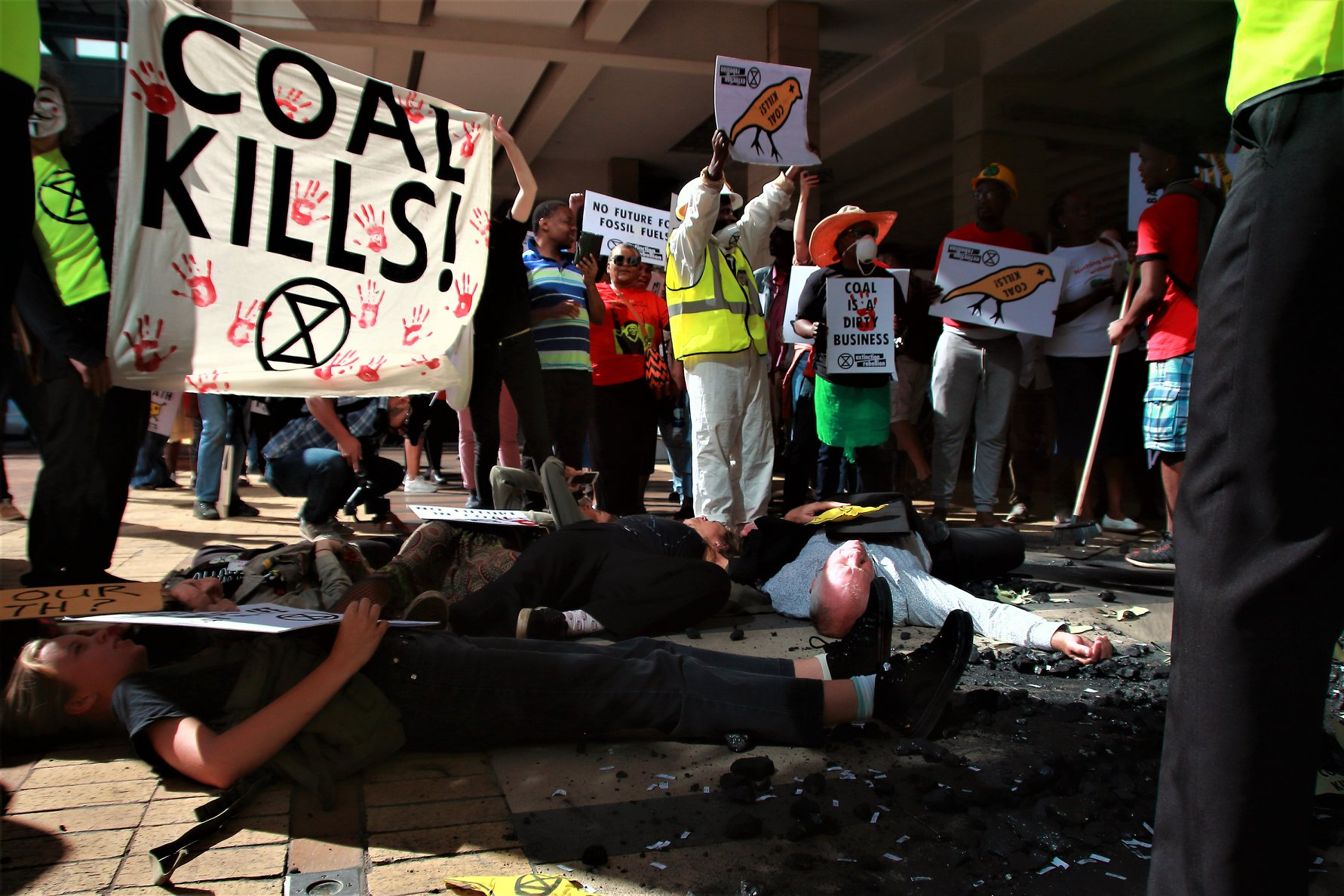
Extinction Rebellion protesting coal in South Africa

- 2022: September, Shell 'Wild Coast' Ocean Exploration Case heard. High Court in Makhanda ruled that Shell's exploration right to conduct seismic surveys on the Wild Coast of South Africa was granted unlawfully and therefore set it aside.

== See also ==
- Federation of Green Parties of Africa
- Anti-nuclear movement
- Environmental issues in Southern Africa
- Geography of South Africa
- Climate change in South Africa
- Environmental racism
- Apartheid
- Square Kilometre Array
