= Southern Africa =

Southernmost region of Africa

Southern Africa (UN subregion and the SACU)

Regions of the African Union: Northern Western Southern Eastern Central Note that Ceuta and Melilla in Northern Africa are parts of Spain.

United Nations geoscheme for Africa Eastern Africa Central Africa Northern Africa Southern Africa Western Africa

Southern Africa is the southernmost region of Africa. No definition is agreed upon, but some groupings include the United Nations geoscheme, the intergovernmental Southern African Development Community, and the physical geography definition based on the physical characteristics of the land. The most restrictive definition considers the region of Southern Africa to consist of Botswana, Eswatini, Lesotho, Namibia, and South Africa, while other definitions also include several other countries from the area.

Defined by physical geography, Southern Africa is home to several river systems; the Zambezi River is the most prominent. The Zambezi flows from the northwest corner of Zambia and western Angola to the Indian Ocean on the coast of Mozambique. Along the way, it flows over Victoria Falls on the border between Zambia and Zimbabwe. Victoria Falls is one of the largest waterfalls in the world and a major tourist attraction for the region.

Southern Africa includes both subtropical and temperate climates, with the Tropic of Capricorn running through the middle of the region, dividing it into its subtropical and temperate halves. Countries commonly included in Southern Africa include Angola, Botswana, Comoros, Eswatini, Lesotho, Madagascar, Malawi, Mauritius, Mozambique, Namibia, South Africa, Zambia, and Zimbabwe. In cultural geography, the island country of Madagascar is often not included due to its distinct language and cultural heritage.

Southern Africa has a more developed economy and infrastructure compared to the other regions of Africa, having a robust mining sector, comparatively developed secondary and tertiary sectors, and a strong manufacturing sector. Nevertheless, the region continues to struggle with inequality, crime, poverty, and the epidemic of HIV/AIDS in Africa, with Eswatini, Lesotho, Botswana, South Africa, and Namibia having the highest HIV/AIDS rates in the world.

== Definitions and usage ==
In physical geography, the geographical delineation for the subregion is the portion of Africa south of the Cunene and Zambezi Rivers: Botswana, Eswatini, Lesotho, Namibia, South Africa, Zimbabwe, and the part of Mozambique that lies south of the Zambezi River. That definition is most often used in South Africa for natural sciences and particularly in guidebooks such as Roberts' Birds of Southern Africa, the Southern African Bird Atlas Project, and Mammals of the Southern African Subregion. It is not used in political, economic, or human geography contexts because the definition cuts Mozambique in two.

=== UN scheme of geographic regions and the SACU ===
In the United Nations geoscheme for Africa, five states constitute Southern Africa:

- Botswana
- Eswatini (Swaziland)
- Lesotho
- Namibia
- South Africa

This definition excludes other countries in the region, and instead includes the Comoros, Madagascar, Malawi, Mauritius, Mayotte, Mozambique, Réunion, the Scattered Islands in the Indian Ocean (as a part of the French Southern Territories), Zambia, and Zimbabwe in Eastern Africa, Angola in Middle Africa (or Central Africa), and Saint Helena, Ascension, and Tristan da Cunha (under the name Saint Helena) in Western Africa, instead. Some atlases include Malawi, Zambia, and Zimbabwe in Central Africa instead of Southern or Eastern Africa.

The Southern African Customs Union, created in 1969, also comprises the five states in the UN subregion of Southern Africa.

=== SADC membership ===
The Southern African Development Community (SADC) was established in 1980 to facilitate co-operation in the region. It includes:

- Angola
- Botswana
- Comoros
- Democratic Republic of the Congo
- Eswatini (Swaziland)
- Lesotho
- Madagascar
- Malawi
- Mauritius
- Mozambique
- Namibia
- Seychelles
- South Africa
- Tanzania
- Zambia
- Zimbabwe

=== General usage ===
Other than the UN subregion, these countries and territories are often included in Southern Africa:

- Angola
- Comoros
- France
  - Mayotte
  - Réunion
  - (French Southern and Antarctic Lands) Scattered Islands in the Indian Ocean
- Madagascar
- Malawi
- Mauritius
- Mozambique
- United Kingdom
  - Saint Helena, Ascension and Tristan da Cunha
- Zambia
- Zimbabwe

The Democratic Republic of the Congo is generally included in Central Africa, while Seychelles and Tanzania are more commonly associated with Eastern Africa, but these three countries have occasionally been included in Southern Africa, as they are the SADC members.

== Geography ==
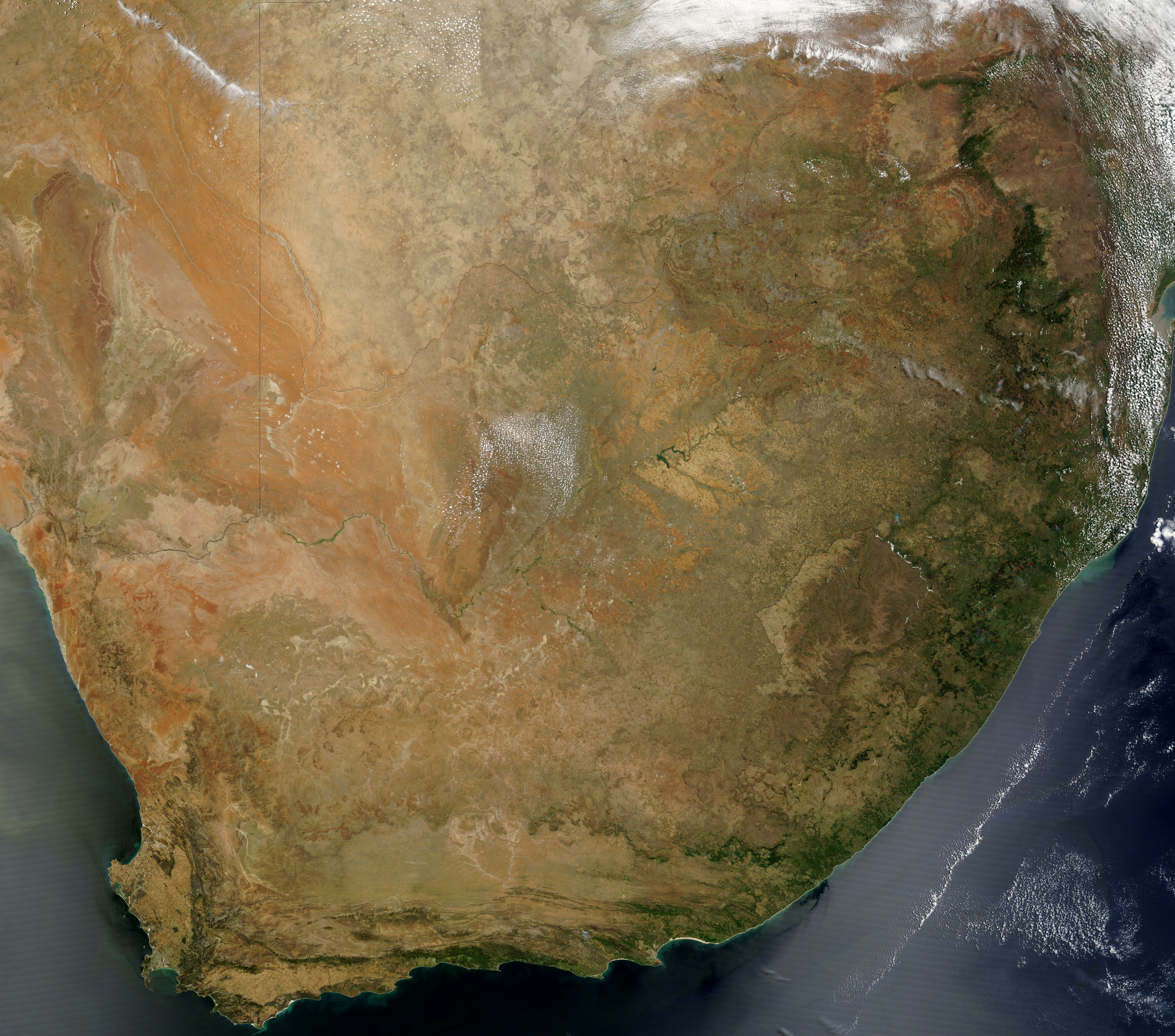
A November 2002 satellite image of Southern Africa

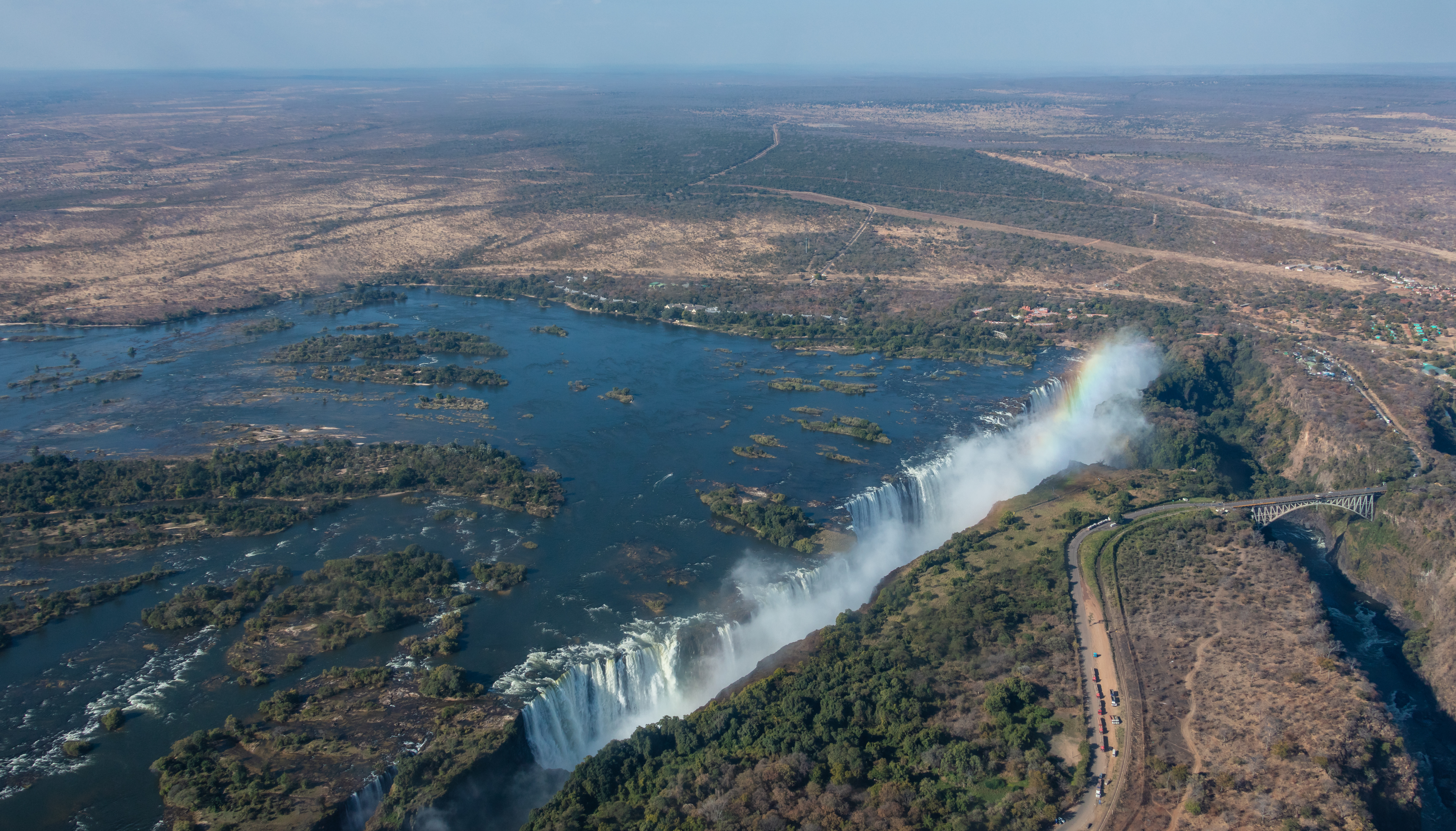
Victoria Falls is part of the Zambezi river, which forms the border between Zimbabwe and Zambia.

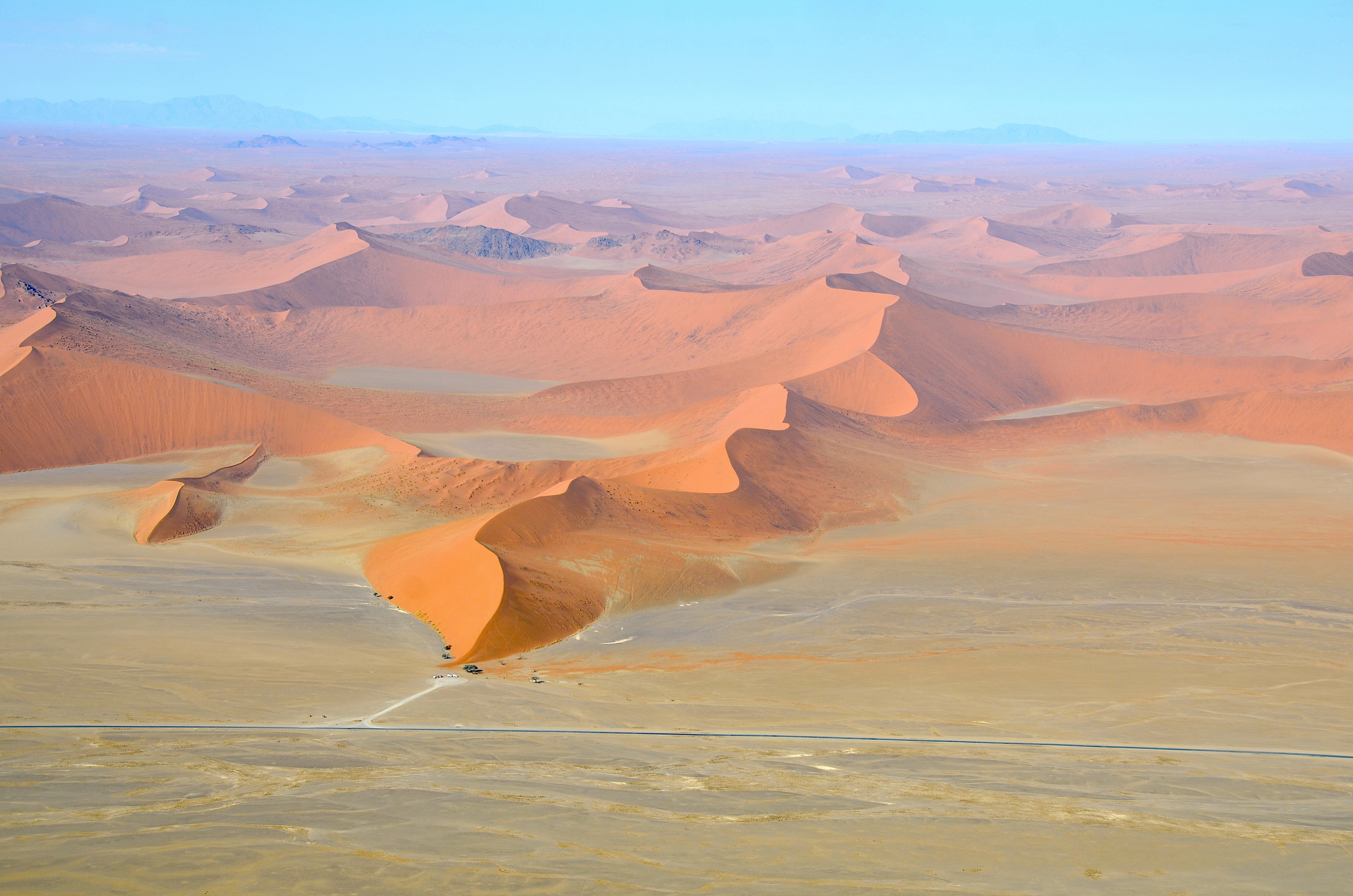
The Namib is a coastal desert in Namibia and Angola.

The terrain of Southern Africa is varied, ranging from forest and grasslands to deserts. The region has both low-lying coastal areas, and mountains.

In terms of natural resources, the region has the world's largest resources of platinum and the platinum group elements, chromium, vanadium, and cobalt, as well as uranium, gold, copper, titanium, iron, manganese, silver, beryllium, and diamonds.

Southern Africa is set apart from other Sub-Saharan African regions because of its mineral resources, including copper, diamonds, gold, zinc, chromium, platinum, manganese, iron ore, and coal. Countries in Southern Africa are larger in geographic area, except three smaller landlocked states: Lesotho, Eswatini (Swaziland), and Malawi. The larger states — South Africa, Botswana, Mozambique, Zimbabwe, Zambia, Namibia, and Angola — all have extensive mineral deposits.

These widespread mineral resources make this one of the wealthiest regions of Africa with the greatest potential for economic growth. A chain of mineral resources in Southern Africa stretches from the rich oil fields in northwest Angola, east through the central diamond-mining region in Huambo Province, and into the Copper Belt region of Zambia and Congo. A region of rich mineral deposits continues to the south called the Great Dyke in central Zimbabwe, through the Bushveld basin into South Africa. This extends southwest through the Witwatersrand and Northern Cape of South Africa toward the southern coast. Mining activity exists across the eastern region. Diamond mining is found in parts of Botswana and along the Namibian coast. Coal can also be found in central Mozambique, Zimbabwe, and northeast South Africa.

== Climate ==
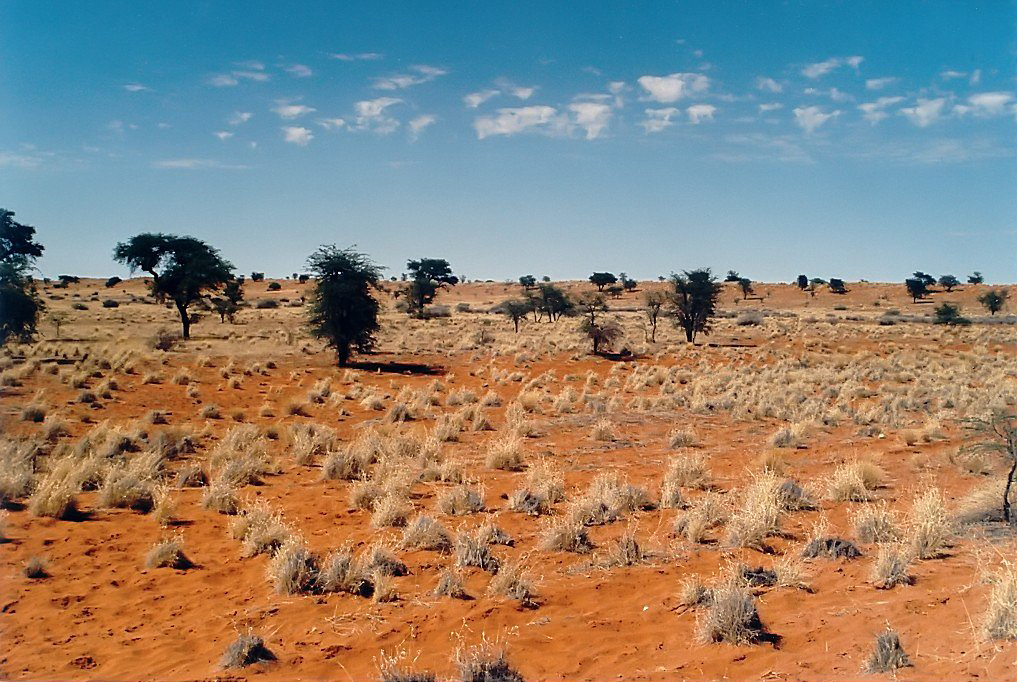
Kalahari Desert in Namibia

The climate of the region is broadly divided into subtropical in the north and temperate in the south, but also includes humid-subtropical, Mediterranean-climate, highland-subtropical, oceanic, desert, and semi-arid regions. Except for lower parts of Zambia and interior areas of Namibia and Botswana, the region rarely suffers from extreme heat. In addition, the winter presents mostly as mild and dry, except in the southwest. Cool southeasterly winds and high humidity bring cool conditions in the winter. The Namib Desert is the driest area in the region.

Altitude plays an outsize role in moderating the temperatures of the South African Highveld, Lesotho, and much of Zambia and Zimbabwe. The prairie region of central and northeast South Africa, the country of Zimbabwe, and parts of Zambia are known as the veldt, divided into the Bushveld and Highveld. There are high temperatures and low rainfall within the Zambezi and Limpopo river valleys, probably due to the lower altitude.

The Western Cape has a Mediterranean vegetation and climate, including the unique fynbos, grading eastward into an oceanic climate along the Garden Route to Gqeberha and East London. The Namib and Kalahari deserts form arid lands in the centre-west, separating the highlands, woodlands, croplands, and pastures of the wetter and higher East from the Atlantic Ocean. In addition, the Drakensberg and Eastern Highlands separate the highland areas and coastal plains centred on Mozambique in the north and KwaZulu-Natal in the south, the latter of which are often prone to flooding every few years. In the east, the river systems of the Zambezi and Limpopo basin form natural barriers and sea lanes between Mozambique, South Africa, and Zimbabwe.

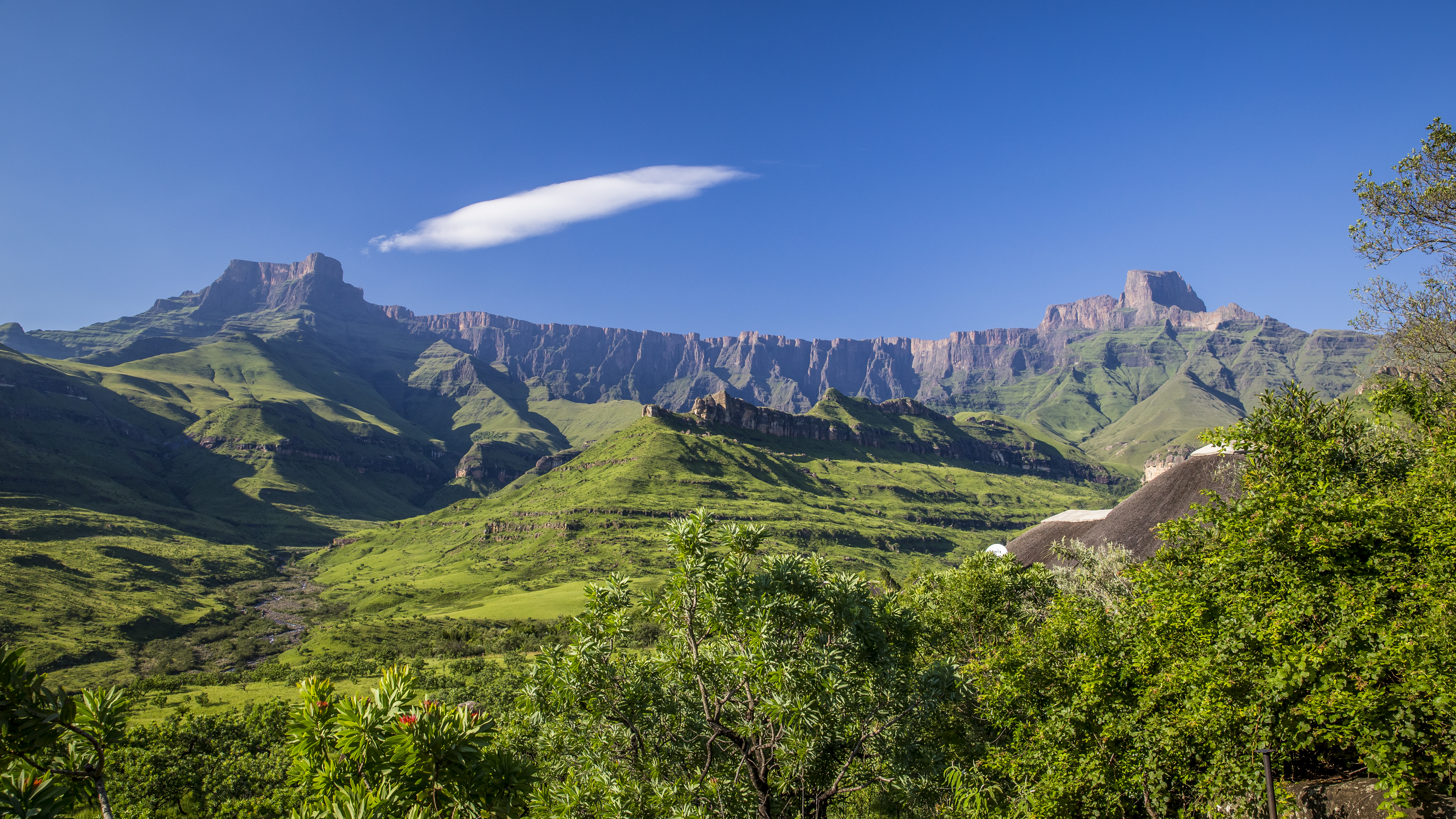
Drakensberg in South Africa

Across most of southern Africa, apart from the Western Cape in South Africa, the major rainfall season is during the southern-hemisphere summer, from December to February. In the Western Cape, the rainfall maximum occurs from June through August.

There are a number of important rainfall-producing weather systems in southern Africa. These include tropical-extra-tropical cloud bands, tropical lows, and tropical cyclones, cut-off lows, and mesoscale convective systems. Winter midlatitude storms account for the June–August rainfall maximum in the western cape.

Year-to-year variability in rainfall, including drought, is associated with changes in global and regional sea surface temperatures. These include the El Nino Southern Oscillation, the Subtropical Indian Ocean Dipole, and changes in the Benguela Current region in the southeast Atlantic.

Future climate projections suggest that much of southern Africa will get hotter and drier in response to global climate change.

== History ==
=== Prehistory ===
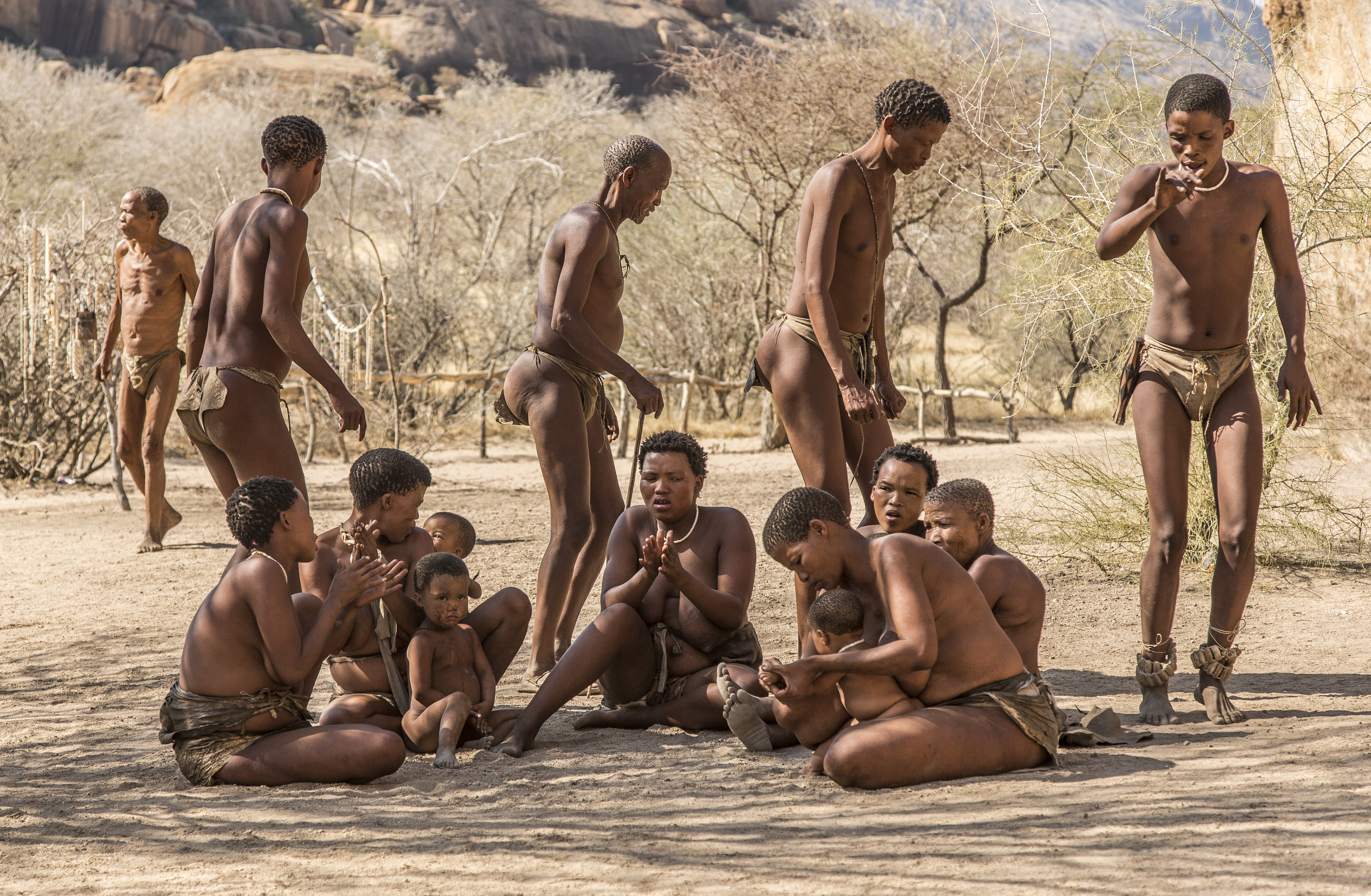
The San people are the oldest inhabitants of Southern Africa.

East and southern Africa are among the earliest regions where modern humans (Homo sapiens) and their predecessors are believed to have lived. In September 2019, scientists reported the computerized determination, based on 260 CT scans, of a virtual skull shape of the last common human ancestor to modern humans, representative of the earliest modern humans, and suggested that modern humans arose between 350,000 and 260,000 years ago through a merging of populations in East and South Africa. Homo naledi likely coexisted with modern humans in Africa about 300,000 years ago.

=== Kingdom of Mapungubwe ===
The Kingdom of Mapungubwe (c. 1075–c. 1220) was one of the earliest state in the South African region. It was located at between the Shashe and Limpopo Rivers. The name is derived from either Karanga and Tshivenda. The kingdom is thought to have existed as the first class-based social system within the region. Society was mainly centered around family and farming. The kingdom would culminate to the Kingdom of Zimbabwe in the 13th century. And at its height the capital's population was about 5000 people. There are no written records from the kingdom and what historians and archeologists know of the state is from the remains of buildings.

=== Kingdom of Zimbabwe and successor states ===
The Kingdom of Zimbabwe (c. 1220–1450) was a Shona (Karanga) kingdom in what is today Zimbabwe. The capital, which sits near present-day Masvingo, is located at Great Zimbabwe, which are the largest stone structure in precolonial Southern Africa. This kingdom came after the collapse of the Kingdom of Mapungubwe. During the decline of the Kingdom of Zimbabwe, two powers emerged, one in the north (Kingdom of Mutapa from 1430–1760) which had improved on Zimbabwe's administrative structure; and the other in the south (Kingdom of Butua from 1450–1683) which was a smaller entity than the former two, the kingdom was governed by the Torwa dynasty and its capital was situated at Khami. Both states would eventually be absorbed by the powerful Shona state, the Rozwi Empire by 1683. The economy was based on cattle herding, farming, and gold mining. The empire lasted until 1866, which came after droughts and instability.

=== Mthethwa Paramountcy ===
The Mthethwa Paramountcy was an African state that emerged in the late 18th-century in the region of present-day KwaZulu-Natal. The state was consolidated and extended under the rule of Dingiswayo who produced a disciplined and highly organised army for the first time in the region.

=== Zulu Kingdom ===
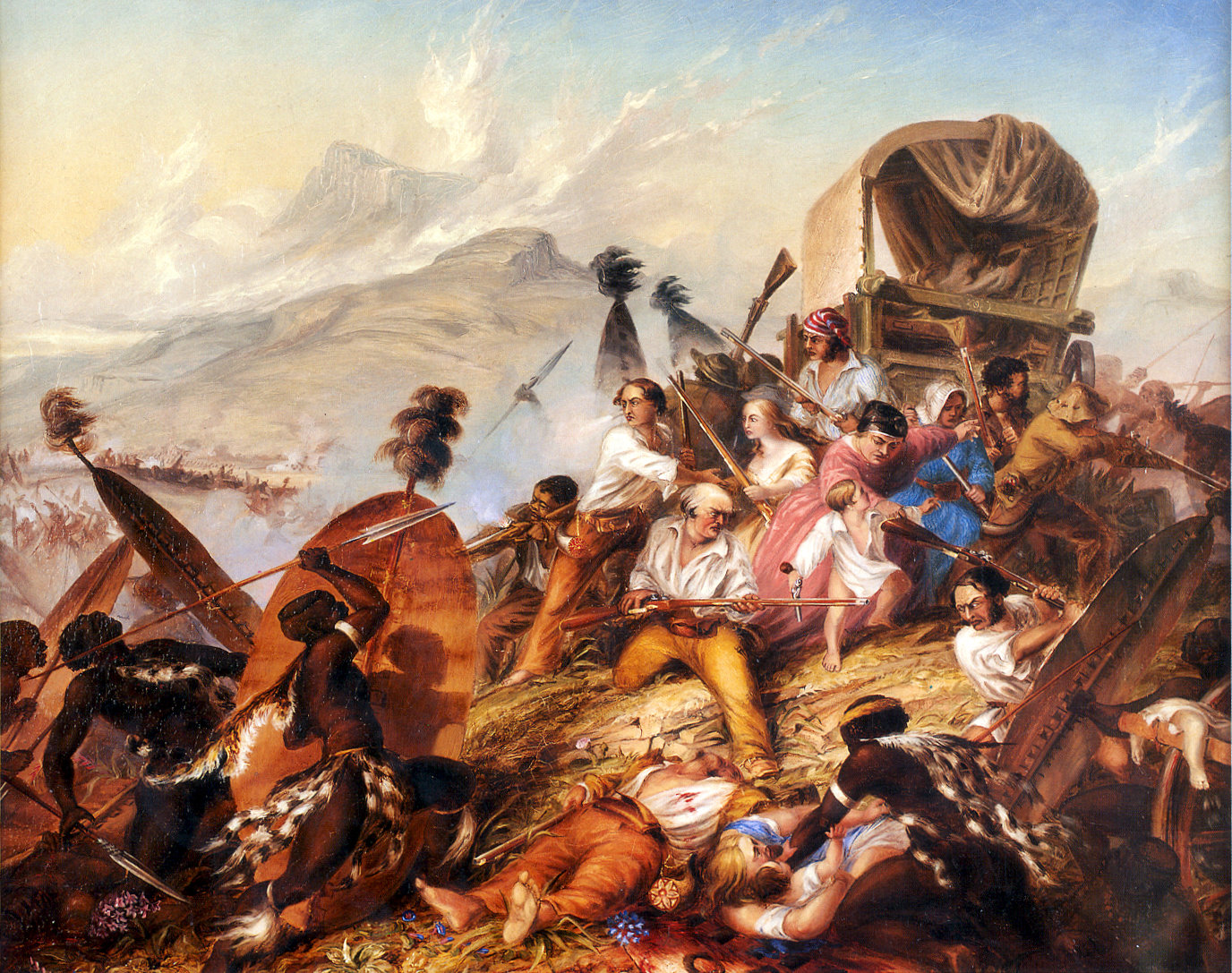
Depiction of a Zulu attack on a Boer camp in February 1838

The Zulu Kingdom rose under the leadership of Shaka and covered most of present-day KwaZulu-Natal in the 19th century. Internal conflict arose in the 1820s between Shaka's half-brothers Dingane and Mhlangana due to a succession dispute. Boer settlers began arriving northwards of the Orange River in the 1830s, which led to conflicts between the two peoples and resulted in the Battle of Blood River in 1838. The kingdom fell during the Anglo-Zulu War of the late 19th-century.

=== Post-colonial eras ===
In the aftermath of World War II, the colonial powers came under international pressure to decolonize. The transfer to an African majority, however, was complicated by the settlement of white peoples. After an initial phase from 1945 to 1958, as a consolidation of white power, decolonization succeeded in its achievement when High Commission territories and overseas departments such as Zambia, Malawi, Botswana, Lesotho, Mauritius, Swaziland, Madagascar and the Comoros became independent states from British and French rule. The brutal struggle for independence in the colonial territories led to the independence of new states of Angola and Mozambique as well as Southern Rhodesia, which declared independence as Zimbabwe in 1980. The denouement of South West Africa achieved independence as Namibia in 1990 and the black majority in South Africa took power after the democratic elections in 1994, therefore ending the Apartheid regime. From the end of the period of colonial rule, imperial interests controlled the economies of the region and South Africa became the dominant economic power in the late 20th century. The 21st century has seen attempts to create unity among nations in Southern Africa. In spite of democracy, violence, inequality and poverty still persist throughout the region.

== Economy ==
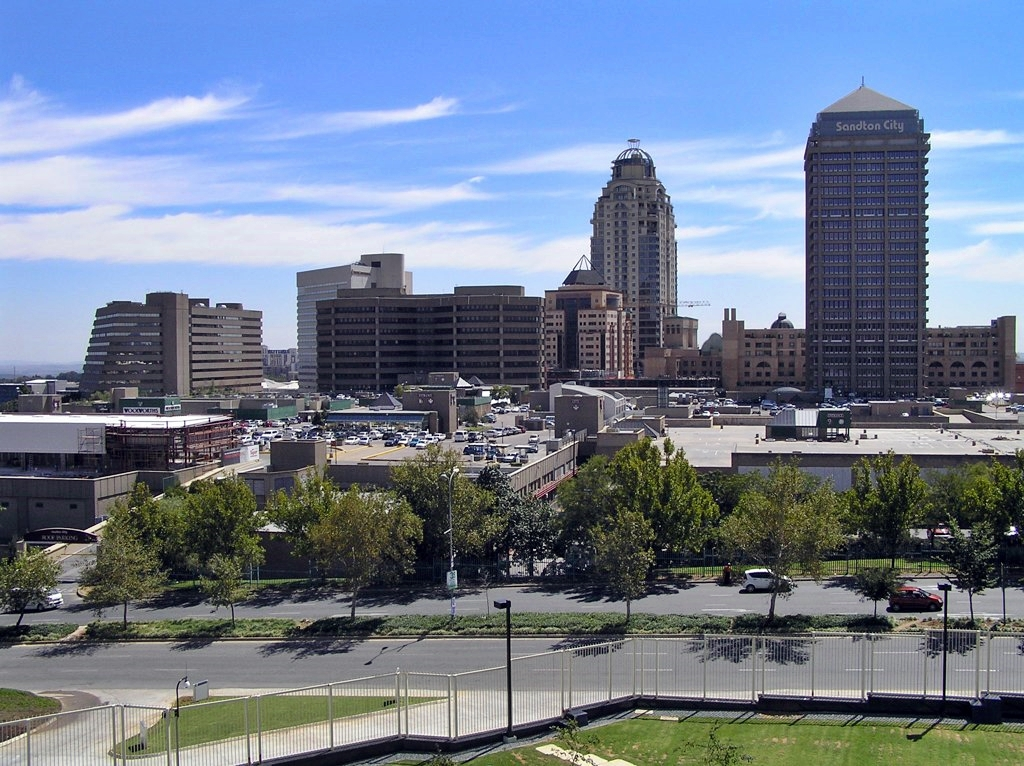
The Sandton section of Johannesburg, the financial centre of South Africa

The region is distinct from the rest of Africa, with a robust mining sector and comparatively developed secondary and tertiary sectors. Additionally many countries (with the exception of Mozambique and Malawi in particular) have relatively well developed infrastructure. Some of its main exports including platinum, diamonds, gold, copper, cobalt, chromium and uranium, Southern Africa still faces some of the problems that the rest of the continent does. Despite this, diamond production has fueled the economies of Botswana and Namibia, for example.

Over the 20th century, the region developed a robust manufacturing sector, focused on South Africa and Zimbabwe, which allowed greater prosperity and investments into infrastructure, education and healthcare that elevated both nations into middle income economies and captured growing markets across Africa. However, since the 1990s these industries have struggled in the face of globalization and cheaper imports from China, leading to job losses particularly in heavy industry, gold mining and textiles. Zimbabwe in particular has seen significant deindustrialization as a result of factors both domestic and foreign. While colonialism has left its mark on the development over the course of history, today poverty, corruption, and HIV/AIDS are some of the biggest factors impeding economic growth. In addition, South Africa and Zimbabwe in particular, face high emigration among their skilled workers leading to a significant brain drain to western economies and billions lost in human capital flight. The pursuit of economic and political stability is an important part of the region's goals, as demonstrated by the SADC, however complete regional integration remains an elusive target.

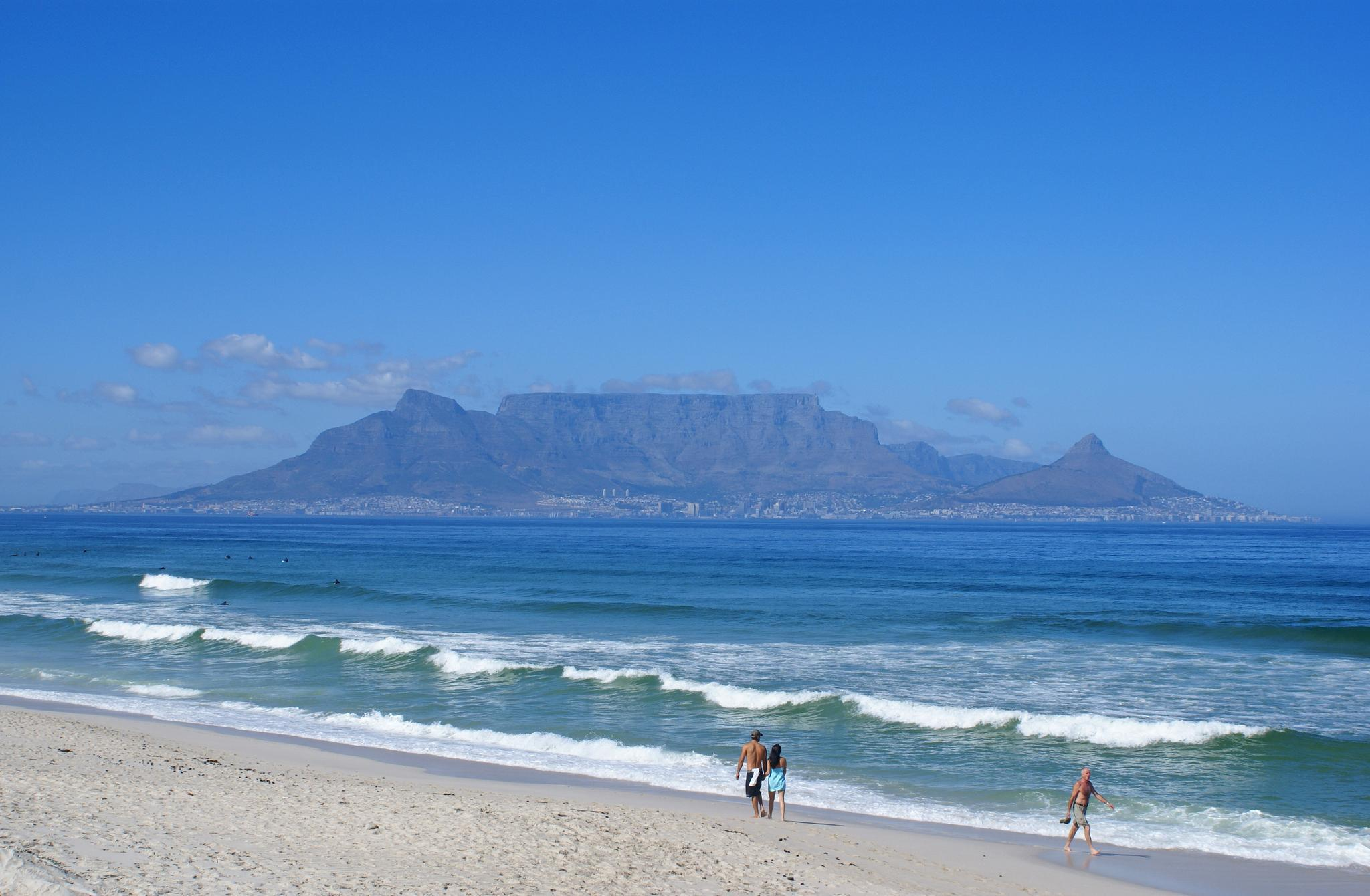
Cape Town is one of the most popular tourist destinations in South Africa.

In terms of economic strength, South Africa is the dominant economy of the region. Generally, mining, agriculture, the public sector and tourism dominate the economies of Southern African countries, apart from South Africa which has mature and flourishing financial, retail, and construction sectors. Zimbabwe maintains a smaller banking and real estate sector along with what remains of its manufacturing industry, despite a protracted economic crisis. Most global banks have their regional offices for Southern Africa based in Johannesburg. Over the years, some of the other Southern African nations have invested in economic diversification, and invested public funds into rail, road and air transportation as part of a concerted effort through SADC to boost regional trade and improve communication and transportation. The countries in this region also belong to the Southern Africa Power Pool, which facilitates the development of a competitive electricity market within the SADC region and ensures sustainable energy developments through sound economic, environmental and social practices. The main objective of the power pool is to develop a world class, robust and safe interconnected electrical system across the Southern African Region. According to a report by Southern Africa Power Pool, the three largest producers of electricity in Southern Africa as at 2017, include Eskom in South Africa with an estimated 46,963MW, Zesco in Zambia with 2,877MW and SNL of Angola with 2,442MW. Whilst moderately successful by African standards, the region largely lags behind their Asian counterparts in innovation, foreign direct investment, STEM sciences and research and development.

== Crime ==
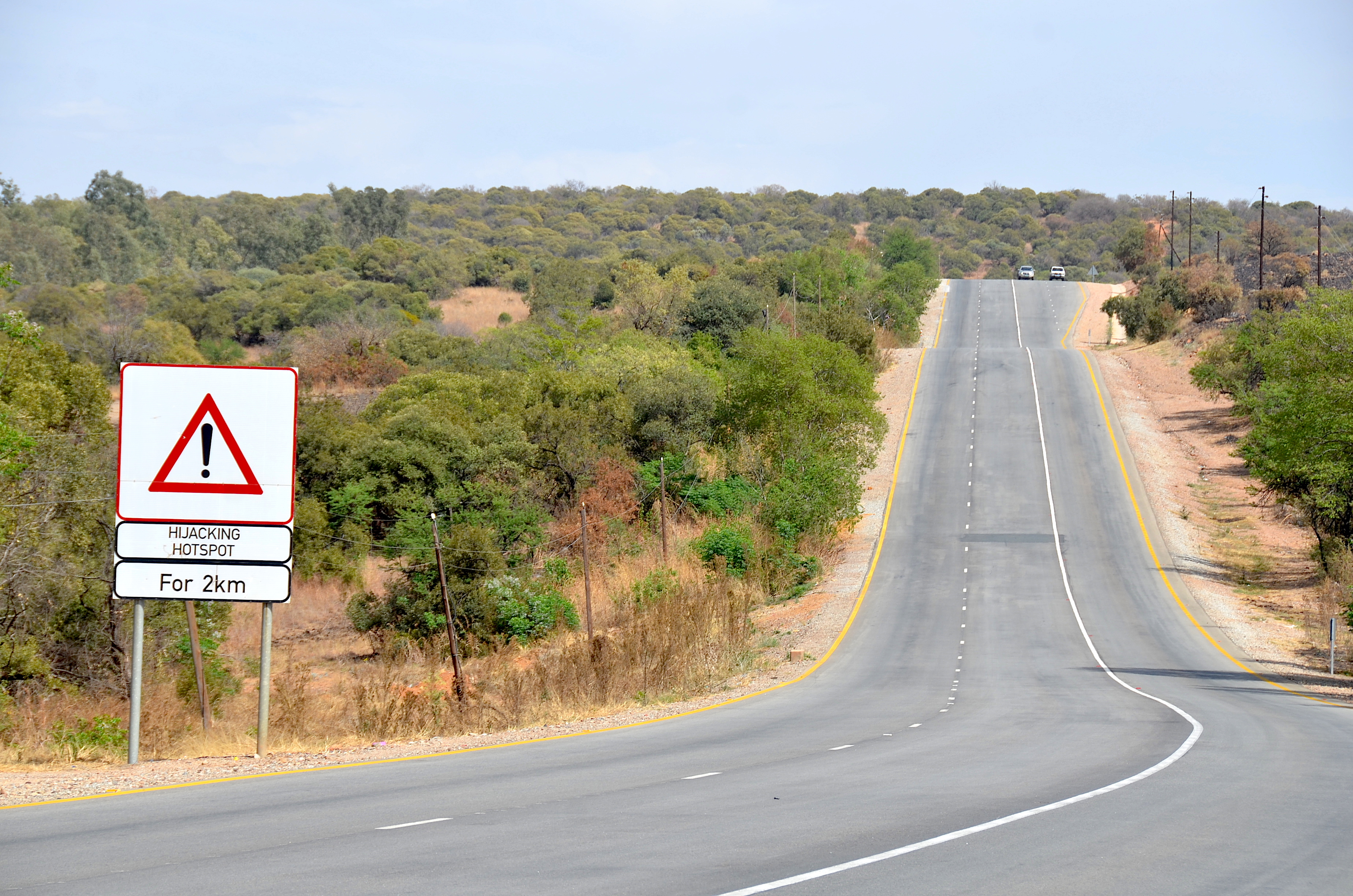
"Hijacking Hotspot" warning sign, R511 in Gauteng

Several countries in the region, especially South Africa and Lesotho, struggle with very high crime rates. South Africa's homicide rate has consistently ranked among the highest in the world during the past decades. South Africa has four cities (Nelson Mandela Bay, Durban, Cape Town and Johannesburg) included in the top 50 most dangerous cities (defined as cities with a population over 300,000 with the highest homicide rates, as reported by The Citizen Council for Public Security and Criminal Justice, a Mexican advocacy group, in its 2023/2024 ranking). High homicide rates are also present in Lesotho, Eswatini, Namibia and Botswana.

== Environment ==
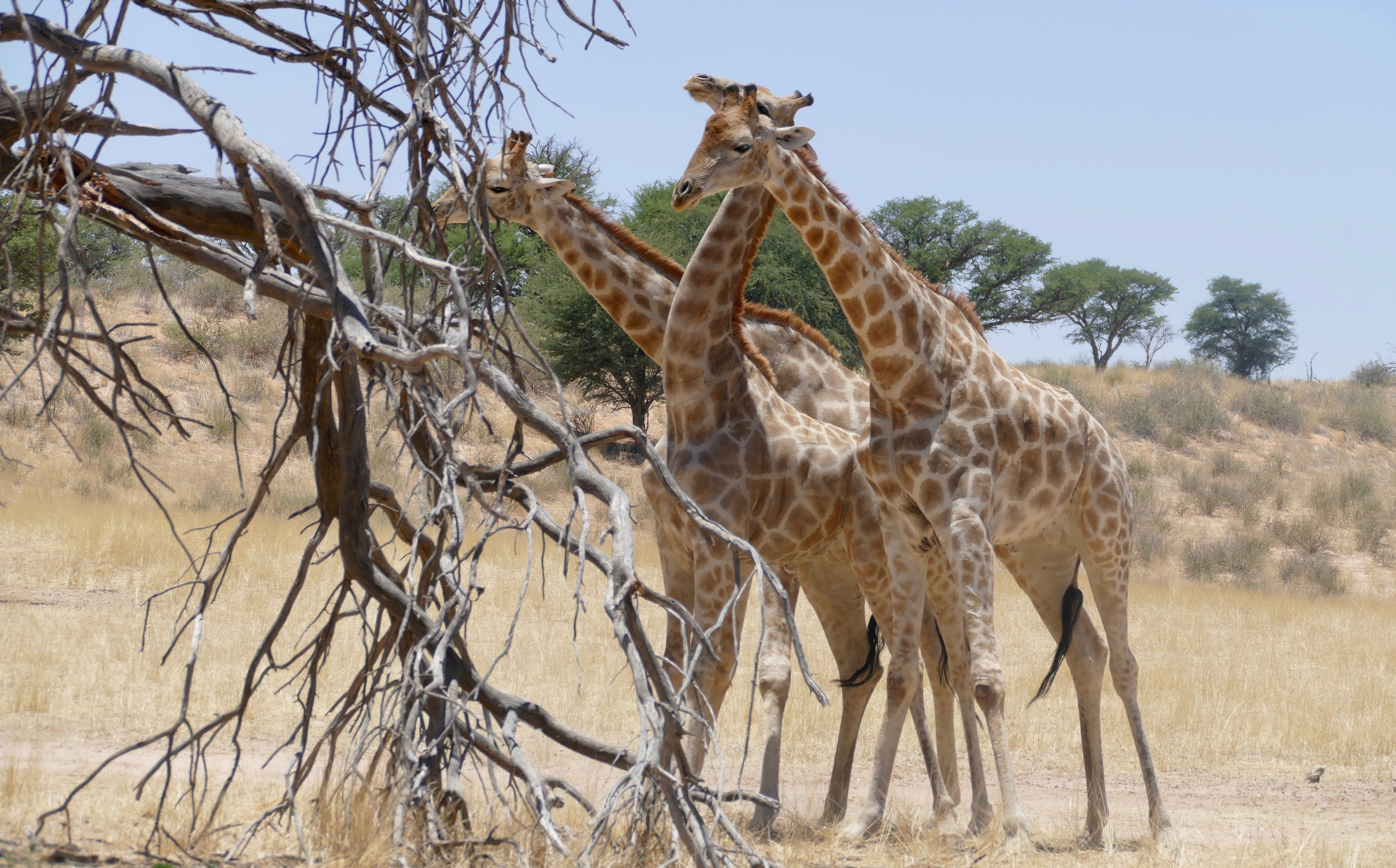
Kgalagadi Transfrontier Park

Southern Africa has a wide diversity of ecoregions including grassland, bushveld, karoo, savannah and riparian zones. Even though considerable disturbance has occurred in some regions from habitat loss due to human population density or export-focused development, there remain significant numbers of various wildlife species, including white rhino, lion, African leopard, impala, kudu, blue wildebeest, vervet monkey and elephant. It has complex Plateaus that create massive mountain structures along the South African border.

There are numerous environmental issues in Southern Africa, including air pollution and desertification.

== Culture ==
=== Art ===
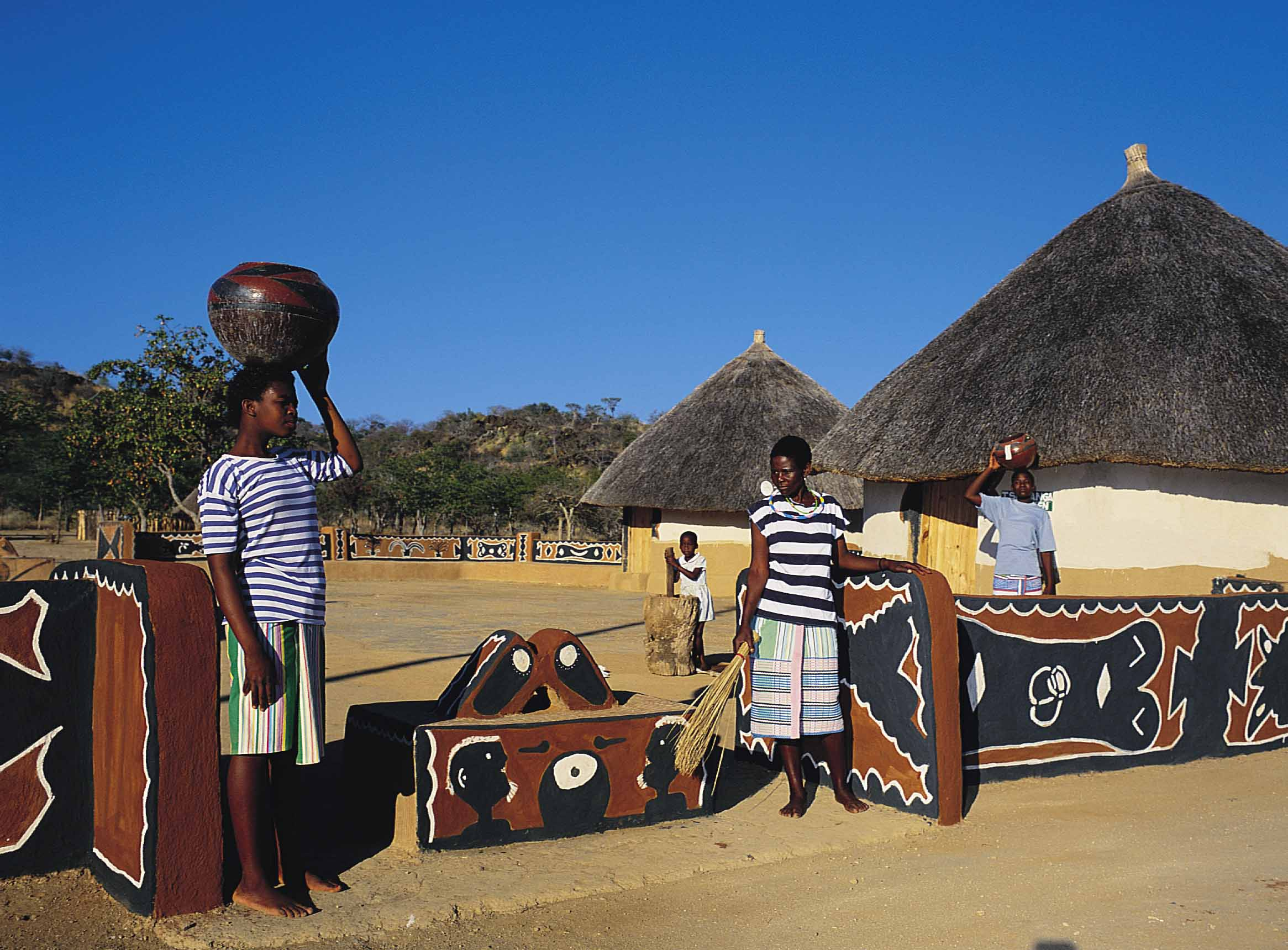
Traditional houses of the Pedi people in South Africa

=== Clothing ===
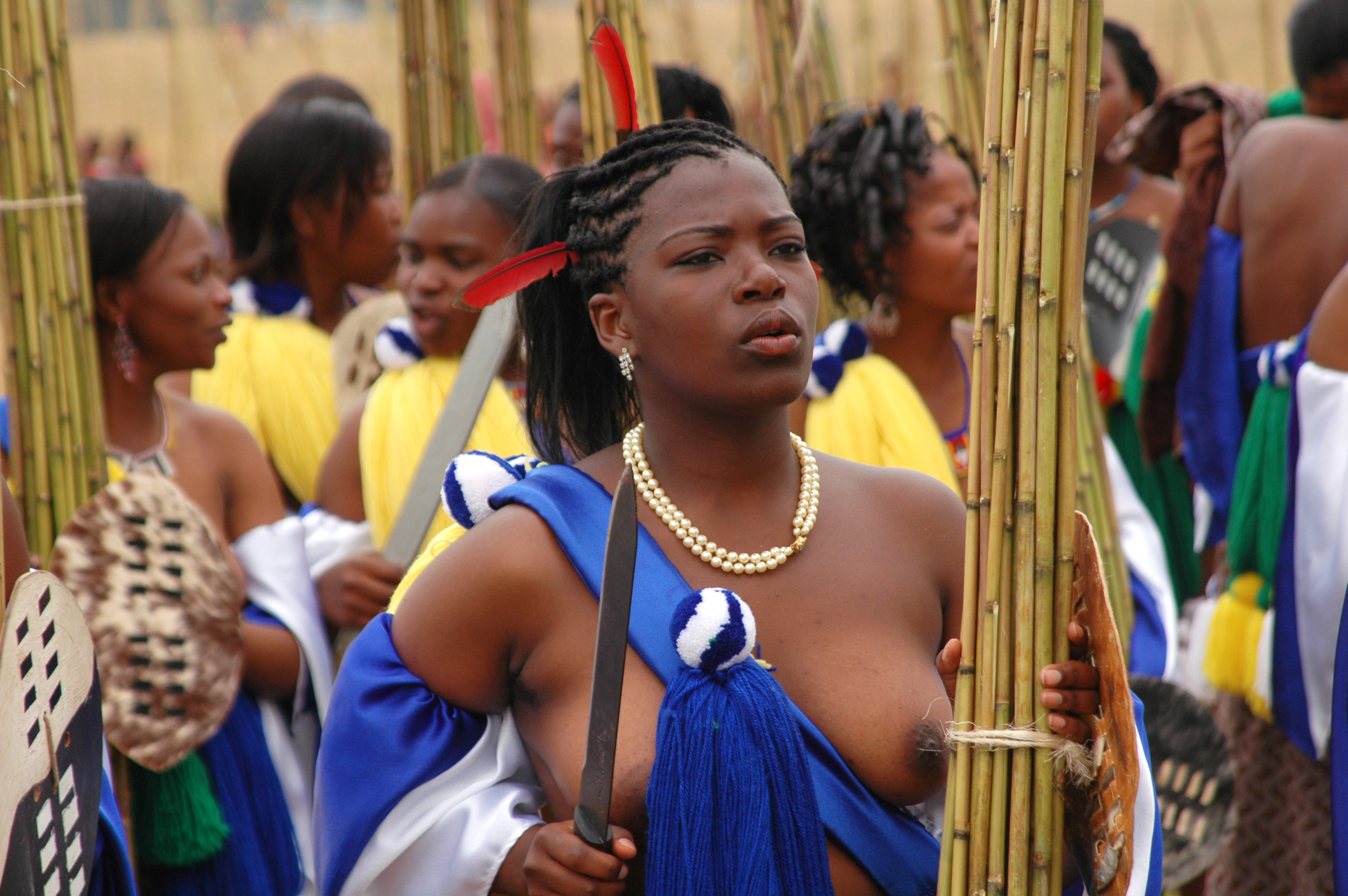
Swazi woman at the Reed Dance ceremony

== Demographics and languages ==
Language families, subfamilies and major languages in Africa

The majority of the population of Southern Africa consists of Bantu peoples. Minority ethnic groups include indigenous people, such as Khoisan peoples, as well as people of European or Asian descent, and multiracial people in Southern Africa. South Africa is the most ethnically diverse country in the region, while the demographics of Eswatini are dominated by one single ethnic group, Swazi people.

Southern Africa is home to many people. It was initially populated by San, Hottentots and Pygmies in widely dispersed concentrations. Due to the Bantu expansion, the majority of African ethnic groups in this region, including the Xhosa, Zulu, Tsonga, Swazi, Northern Ndebele, Southern Ndebele, Tswana, Sotho, Pedi, Mbundu, Ovimbundu, Shona, Chaga and Sukuma, speak Bantu languages. The process of colonization and settling resulted in a small population of European (Afrikaner, British, Portuguese Africans, etc.) and Asian descent (Cape Malays, Indian South Africans, etc.) people in many southern African countries.

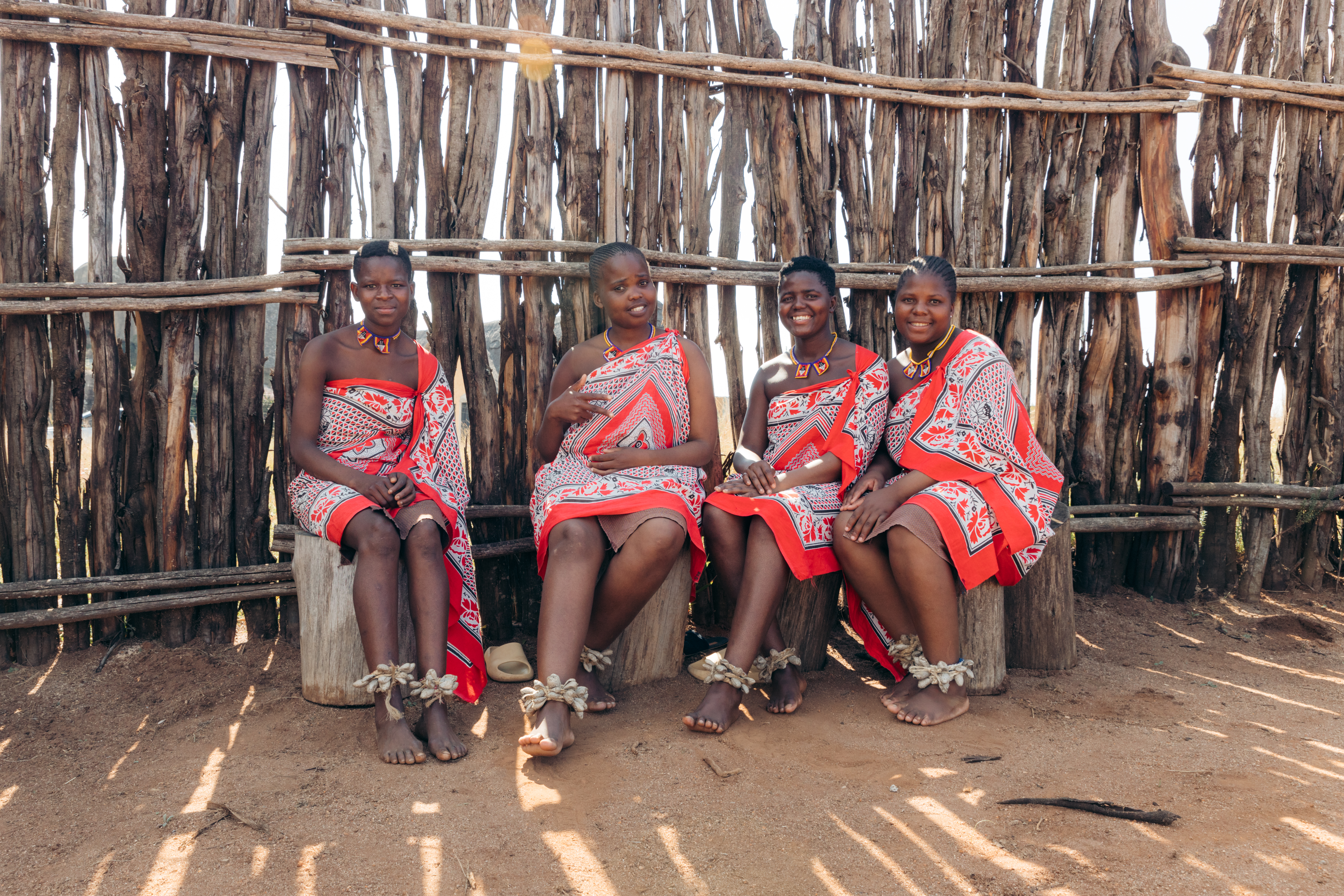
Swazi women

Christianity is by far the most common religion in the region, being the religion of the majority of the population in all countries of Southern Africa (see Christianity in Africa). There are also sizeable Muslim communities in Mozambique and Malawi, and smaller communities in the other countries of the region. There is also a small Hindu community in South Africa. In addition, traditional African religions are also practiced.

== Architecture ==
Further information in the sections of Architecture of Africa:

- Medieval Southern African Architecture

== Science and technology ==
Further information in the sections of History of science and technology in Africa:

- Astronomy
- Mathematics
- Medicine
- Agriculture
- Textiles
- Architecture
- Warfare
- By country

== Agriculture and food security ==
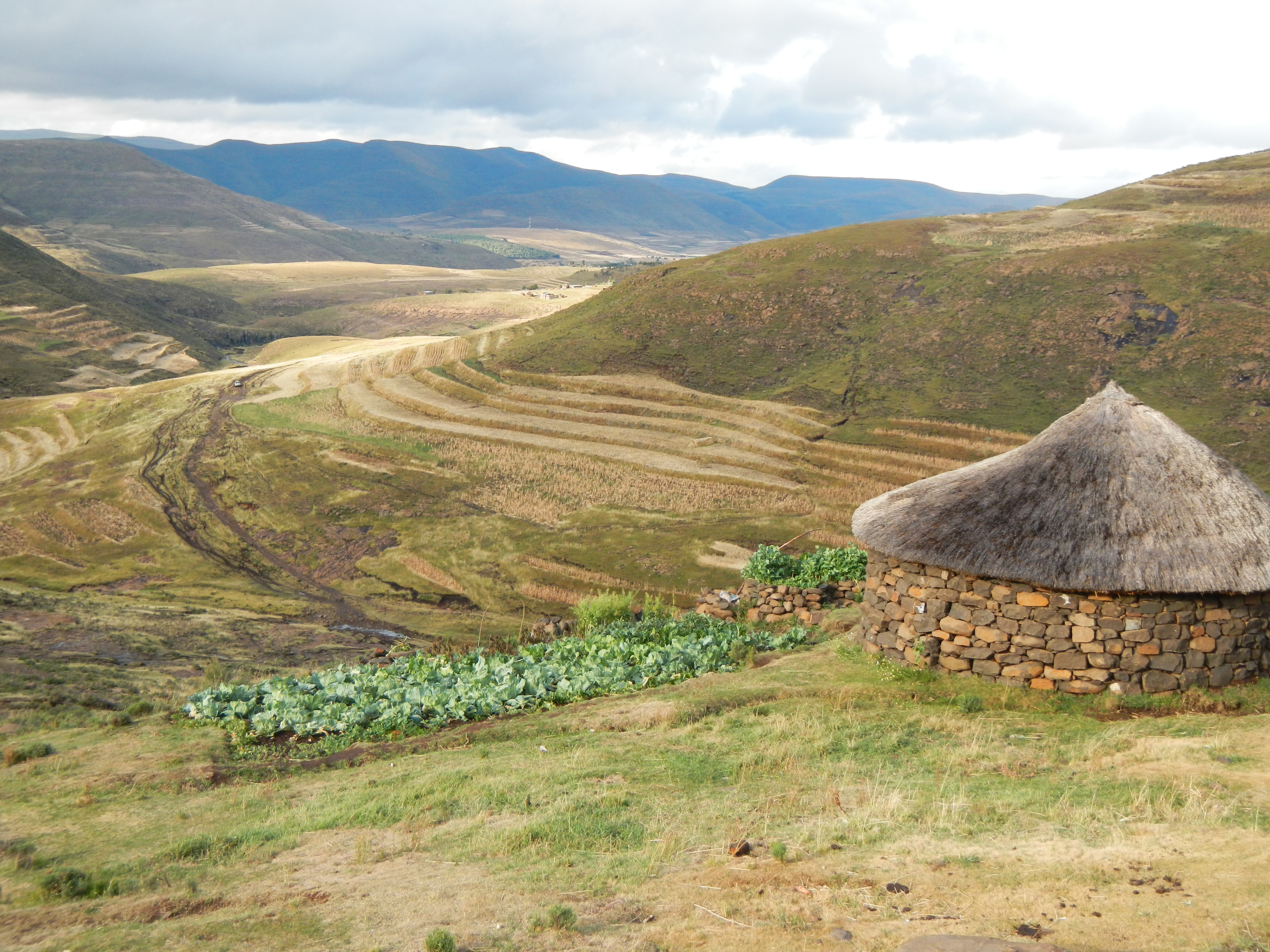
Field in Lesotho

Some key factors affecting the food security within the regions including political instability, poor governance, droughts, population growth, urbanisation, poverty, low economic growth, inadequate agricultural policies, trade terms and regimes, resource degradation and the recent increase in HIV/AIDS.

These factors vary from country to country. For example, the Democratic Republic of the Congo has favourable climatic and physical conditions, but performs far below its capacity in food provision due to political instability and poor governance. In contrast, semi-arid countries such as Botswana and Namibia, produce insufficient food, but successfully achieve food security through food imports due to economic growth, political stability and good governance. The Republic of South Africa is a major food producer and exporter in the region.

Data on agricultural production trends and food insecurity especially in term of food availability for Southern Africa is readily available through the Famine Early Warning Systems Network (FEWS NET) and Southern African Development Community (SADC) - Food, Agriculture and Nature Resource Directorate (FARN). However, this data might not fully capture the reality of a region with large urban populations and where food insecurity goes beyond per-capita availability to issues of access and dietary adequacy.

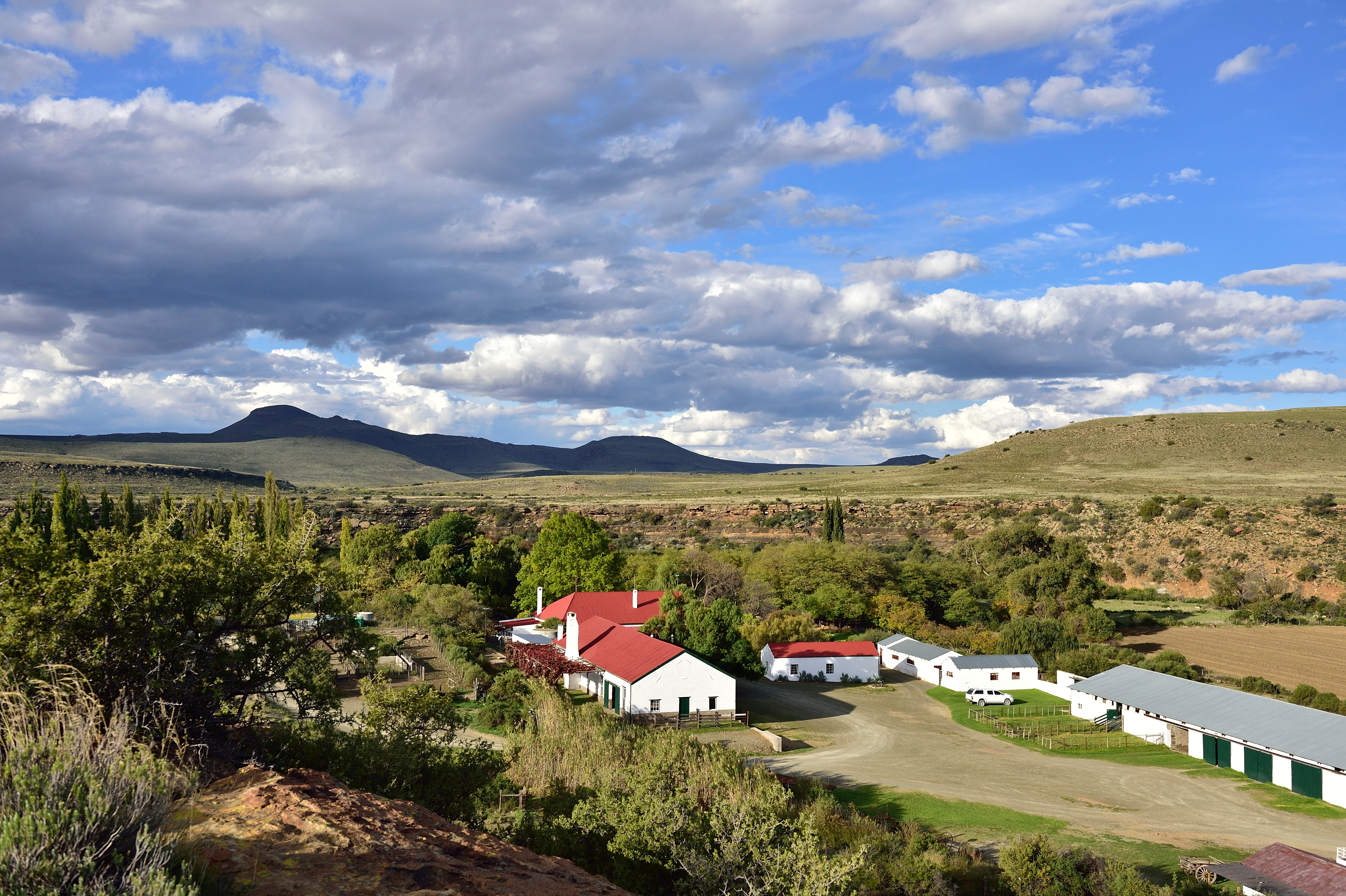
Farm in Eastern Cape, South Africa

Urban food security has been noted as an emerging area of concern in the region, with recent data showing high levels of food insecurity amongst low-income households. In a study of eleven cities in nine countries: Blantyre, Cape Town, Gaborone, Harare, Johannesburg, Lusaka, Maputo, Manzini, Maseru, Durban, and Windhoek, only 17% of households were categorized as 'food-secure' while more than half (57%) of all households surveyed were found to be 'severely food-insecure'.

Some factors affecting urban food insecurity include climate change with potential impact on agricultural productivity, the expansion of supermarkets in the region, which is changing the way people obtain food in the city, rural-to-urban migration, unemployment, and poverty. The issue of food insecurity in general and urban food insecurity in particular in the region is also characterized by an increased consumption of caloric junk food and processed foods leading to potential increase in the co-existence of undernutrition and dietary-related chronic diseases such as obesity and hypertension. In South Africa for example, while over 50% experience hunger, 61% are overweight or morbidly obese. There is only limited data on the other Southern African countries.

From 2018 to 2021, parts of the region suffered from a period of drought.

== See also ==
- Central Africa
- East Africa
- Kalahari Desert
- Maghreb
- North Africa
- Northeast Africa
- Southeast Africa
- Sub-Saharan Africa
- West Africa
- History of the Jews in Southern Africa
