= Environmental issues in Southern Africa =

There are a range of environmental issues in Southern Africa, such as climate change, land, water, deforestation, land degradation, and pollution. The Southern Africa region itself, except for South Africa, produces less carbon emissions but is a recipient of climate change impacts characterized by changes in precipitation, extreme weather events and hot temperatures. Through an attempt of keeping up with the developing world and trying to meet the high demands of the growing population, Southern Africa has exhausted its many resources resulting in severe environmental damage. Southern Africa's log, and produce are the cores of their economy, and this region has become dependent on these resources. The continuous depleting and improper treatment of their natural resources have led Southern Africa to the state where they are.

== Background ==
Southern Africa consists of countries such as: Angola, Botswana, Eswatini, Lesotho, Malawi, Mozambique, Namibia, South Africa, Zambia, and Zimbabwe. Lesotho is surrounded by South Africa (it is in the middle of South Africa).

Some environmental issues that affect Southern Africa are: water pollution, air pollution, land degradation, solid waste pollution, and deforestation. The environmental damage affects not only the population's health, but also the species that live in the area, while also contributing to the worldwide issue of climate change.

== Water issues ==
One of Southern Africa's biggest issues is the lack of clean water. According to The United Nations Convention on Climate Change on South Africa in 2000, the water around Africa is unevenly distributed, meaning that 60% of the water is situated in only 20% of the land. Less than 10% of Southern Africa's surface water is accessible and due to the fact that a majority of their groundwater lay under large rock formations, groundwater becomes difficult to access as well. Climate change and its attendant effects on temperature and precipitation may have an additional impact.

Many Africans are moving to rural areas, adding to the already high demands for clean water and while demands are growing drastically, freshwater supplies remain limited. Adding to the high demands, Durban's dam has decreased by 20% since 2010, and up to 30% of the water has either been stolen or given away illegally through international trading. "A review of water availability in 1996 estimated that the total average annual surface runoff was 150 million cubic metres, the maximum potential annual system yield was 33 290 million cubic meters, and total water annual requirements were 20 045 million cubic metres. Water requirements could increase by about 50% by 2030 (Department of Water and Forestry, 2000)."

Although South Africa has of the best, cleanest water out of all the countries in Southern Africa, many don't have access to basic sanitation. A majority of Southern Africa's accessible water is unclean, making the water vulnerable for water transmitted diseases to exist. Water-borne diseases such as Hepatitis A and Hepatitis E increase, while some of the water become so unclean that diseases such as: Typhoid fever, Leptospirosis, Schistosomiasis, and Bilharzia are transmitted through water contact.

== Environmental pollution ==
=== Water pollution ===
==== Urbanization ====
As the population of people moving to urbanized areas increase, the demands for food supply also grow. As a mean to keep up with these high demands, the use of fertilization and sewage contamination also incline. Chemicals found in fertilizers and sewage wastes can cause diseases, which is harmful to other species in the environment. Diseases increase which may cause illnesses such as: diarrhea, hayfever, skin rashes, vomiting, fevers, gastroenteritis, muscle and joint pains, and eye irritations.

==== Oil spills ====
Due to the high volume of oil transported via the Cape Route which runs along the coast of South Africa, the region is vulnerable to oil spills. Policing and strict regulation is in place to mitigate risks of marine pollution.

==== Coal mining and how it affects the environment ====
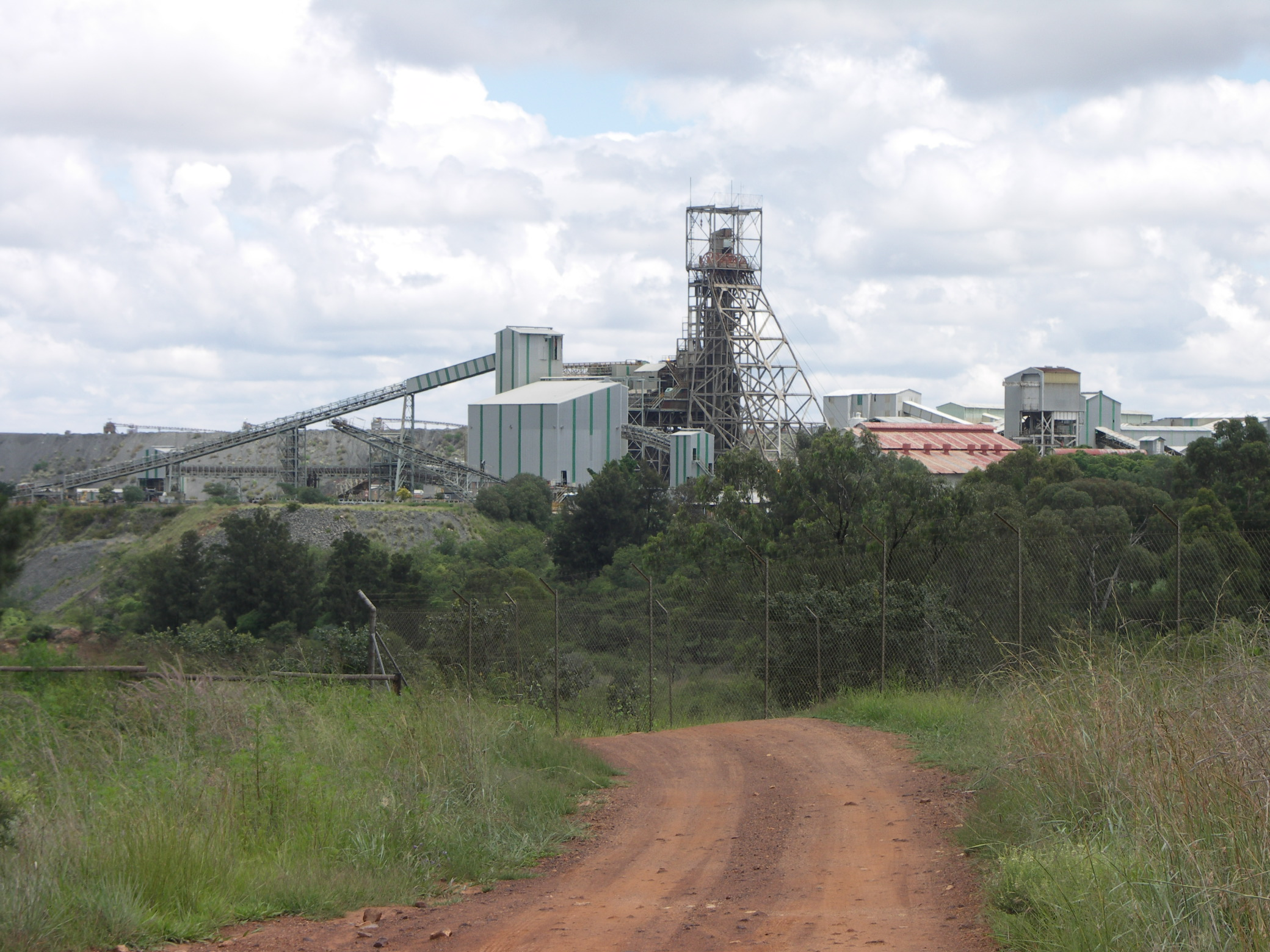
South Africa-Cullinan Premier Mine

Coal mining is one of Southern Africa's main energy sources, but it holds a huge negative impact on the land's water, air and soil quality. Acid mine drainage is the result of the excess coal mining that occurs. Sulphuric Acid is released from coal mining, and although the generalizing process is slow, the time it takes for the acid to neutralize is equally as slow. When clean, excess water is released from the rock masses that are broken through mining, it's mixed with the sulphuric acid causing the water to become toxic. This toxic, contaminated water kills plants and animals, while also dissolving aluminium and heavy minerals found in clean water (increasing toxicity level). Although rocks which contain calcium carbonate are able to neutralize the acidic water, Southern Africa does not have the rocks which contain these minerals.

=== Air pollution ===
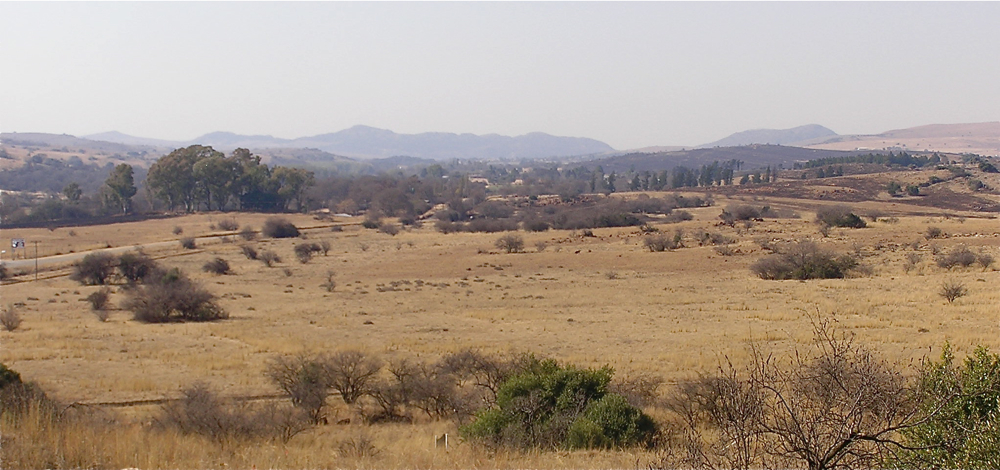
Highveld in Gauteng Province

Southern Africa experiences poor ambient and indoor air quality.

In this developing region, low-grade fuels are used to meet high demands for food, and energy.

During the winter, pollutants are trapped in the air due to the high pressure, and are unable to move or dissipate. In the summer, due to the low pressure, pollutants are dissipated through unstable circulation. Many women are also cooking indoors with fossil fuels, which is the main cause for the health problems in women and children.

75.2% of Southern Africa's energy come from Highveld Areas, where 5 of its 10 Eskom Power Stations are the largest in the world. Highveld areas are above sea level, making the oxygen level 20% less than the oxygen level in the coast. This results in an incomplete combustion of fossil fuels, and a severe nocturnal temperature inversion to occur; which results in smoke being trapped in the air 860 tons of SO_{2} is produced from 3 of their main power stations (Matla, Duvha and Arnot), "which exceeds the World Health Organisation's (WHO) [exposure to particulate matter] standards of 180 mg.m-3 by 6 to 7 times during winter months (Annegarn et al. 1996 a,b)". This high concentration of air pollution surround the area making it very dangerous to one's health.

=== Littering ===
With the increase of population, and an increase in people who are moving to urbanized areas, the number of solid waste produced is increasing. South Africa's Department of Environmental Affairs and Tourism estimates that over half of the population of South Africa lack "adequate" solid waste treatment, instead, waste is often dumped, buried or burned.

== Soil degradation ==
With the decrease in water and the high demands for agriculture, Southern Africa's land is becoming less fertile. Climate change is also causing an increase in water evaporation from the soil, making it very difficult for produce in Southern Africa. Africa itself is located in an area where climate is unpredictable, making them vulnerable to climate change and while Southern Africa is semi-arid, it puts them at risk for desertification.

Desertification causes an increase in soil erosion, making it difficult for plants to grow. This will lead to unsustainable food, and endanger Southern Africa's wildlife. Through time, soil erosion will result in harvesting alien plants. Alien plants threaten indigenous plants and reduce grazing areas, which contributes to soil erosion.

Southern Africa's land is already over cropped and over-grazed as a result of Africa's undistributed lands. With the combination of alien plants and the exhaustion of their lands, Southern Africa's degraded land is beyond repair. Many countries use the method of irrigation as a way to prevent desertification and droughts. Unfortunately, only 4% of Sub-Saharan Africa is equipped for irrigation. With the decrease in rainfall, and the lack of irrigation, Southern Africa's land and soil will soon become arid.

== See also ==
- Environmental movement in South Africa
- Geography of South Africa
- Wildlife smuggling in southern Africa
