= Climate change in South Africa =

Emissions, impacts and responses of South Africa related to climate change

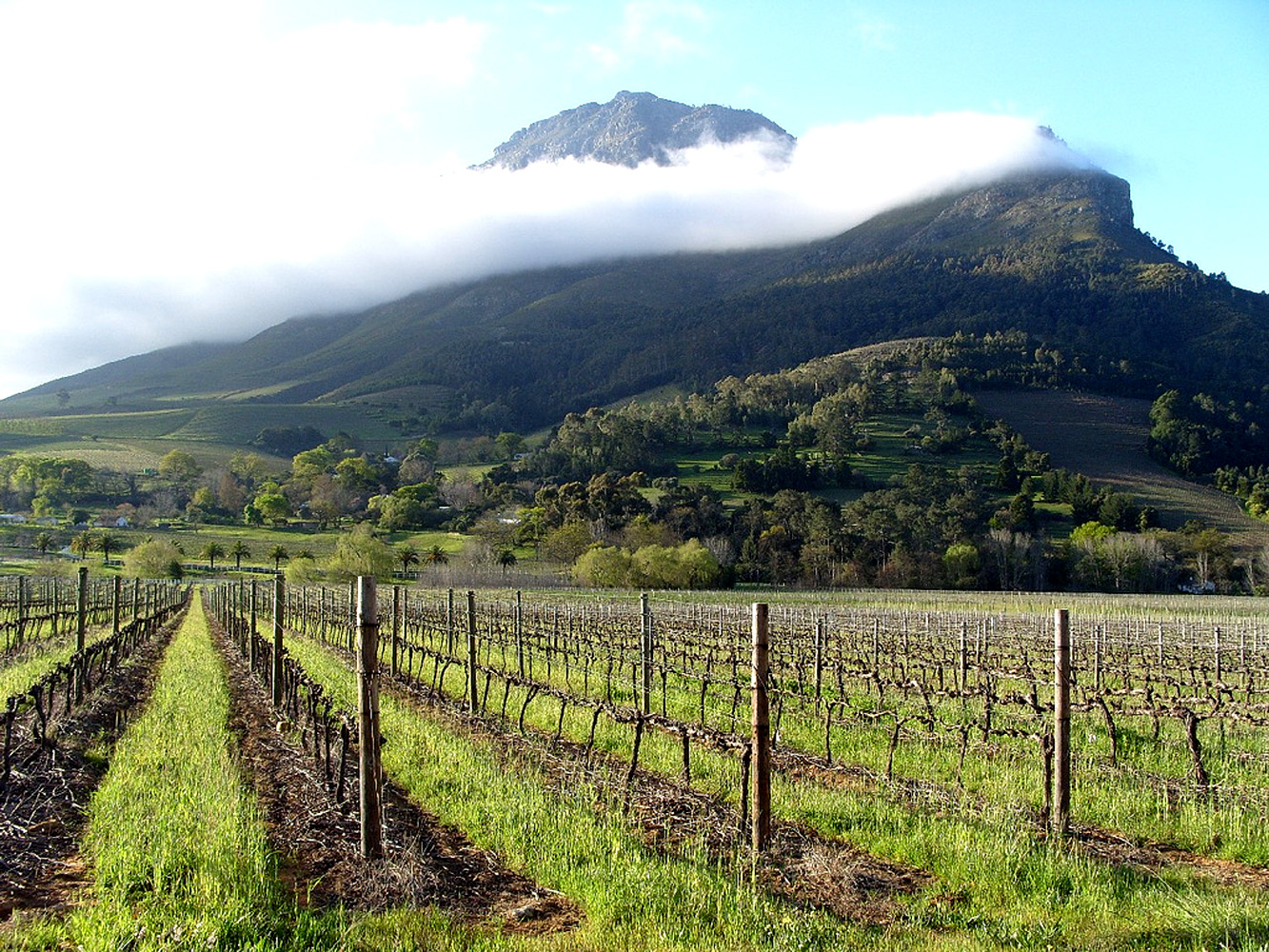
Climate change will impact agriculture in South Africa (trellised vines in Stellenbosch).

Climate change in South Africa is leading to increased temperatures and rainfall variability. Evidence shows that extreme weather events are becoming more prominent due to climate change. This is a critical concern for South Africans as climate change will affect the overall status and wellbeing of the country, for example with regard to water resources. Just like many other parts of the world, climate research showed that the real challenge in South Africa was more related to environmental issues rather than developmental ones. The most severe effect will be targeting the water supply, which has huge effects on the agriculture sector. Speedy environmental changes are resulting in clear effects on the community and environmental level in different ways and aspects, starting with air quality, to temperature and weather patterns, reaching out to food security and disease burden.

The various effects of climate change on rural communities are expected to include: drought, depletion of water resources and biodiversity, soil erosion, decreased subsistence economies and cessation of cultural activities.

South Africa contributes considerable CO_{2} emissions, being the 14th largest emitter of CO_{2}. Above the global average, South Africa had 9.5 tons of CO_{2} emissions per capita in 2015. This is in large part due to its energy system relying heavily on coal and oil. As part of its international commitments, South Africa has pledged to peak emissions between 2020 and 2025.

== Greenhouse gas emissions ==
South Africa is the world's 14th largest emitter of greenhouse gases.

=== Energy sector ===
South Africa has a large energy sector, being the largest economy in Africa. The country consumed 227 TWh of electricity in 2018.

==== Renewable energy ====
Renewable energy in South Africa is energy generated in South Africa from renewable resources, those that naturally replenish themselves—such as sunlight, wind, tides, waves, biomass, and geothermal heat. Renewable energy focuses on four core areas: electricity generation, air and water heating/cooling, transportation, and rural energy services. The energy sector in South Africa is an important component of global energy regimes due to the country's innovation and advances in renewable energy. South Africa's greenhouse gas (GHG) emissions are ranked as moderate, and its per capita emission rate is higher than the global average. Energy demand within the country is expected to rise steadily and double by 2025.

Total renewable energy capacity, 2014–2024 (MW)
2014	2015	2016	2017	2018	2019	2020	2021	2022	2023	2024
2,711	3,430	4,652	6,552	7,911	8,014	9,523	9,827	10,505	10,623	11,129

=== Transportation ===
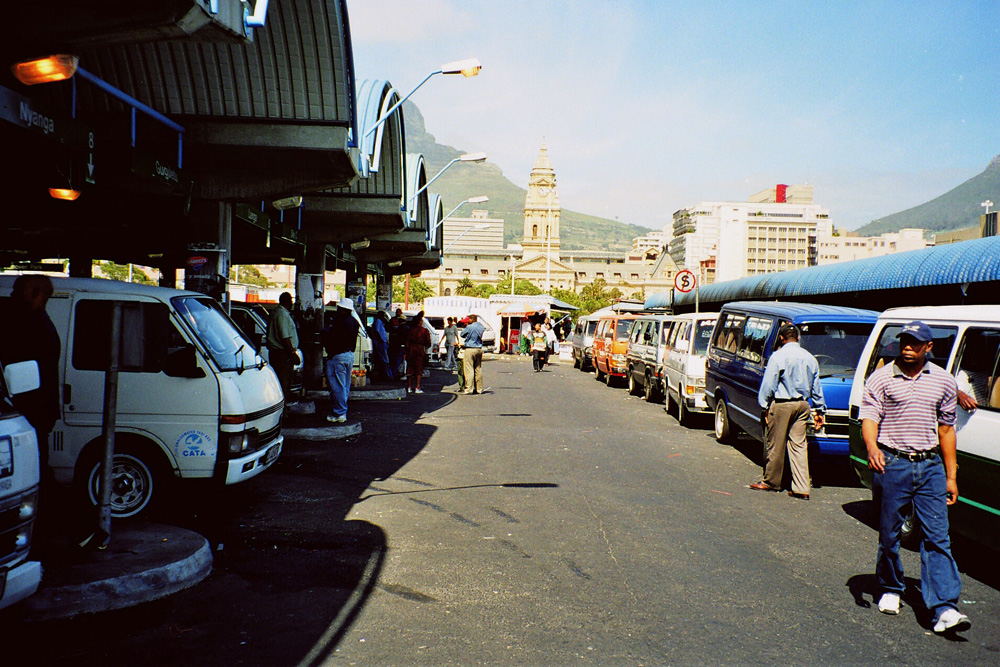
Cape Town minibus taxi rank

The transport sector in South Africa contributes 10.8% of total Greenhouse gas (GHG) Emissions in the country. Apart from the direct emissions, indirect emissions through the production and transportation of fuels also provide substantial emissions. Road transport, in particular, contributes approximately three-quarters to total transport emissions.

== Impacts on the natural environment ==
=== Temperature and weather changes ===
Köppen climate classification map for South Africa for 1980–2016

2071–2100 map under the most intense climate change scenario. Mid-range scenarios are currently considered more likely.

There has been different confirmations over climate change effects in South Africa with a rapid decrease in rain fall and noticed high temperature levels. Climate change is expected to raise temperatures in South Africa by 2–3 degrees Celsius by mid-century, and 3–4 degrees Celsius by the end of the century in an intermediate scenario. Impacts will also include changing rain patterns and increased evaporation, increasing the likelihood of extreme droughts.

Africa is currently and prospectively suffering from significant heat waves based on the nature of the continent amid the current environmental crisis.

== Impacts on people ==
=== Economic impacts ===
==== Agriculture ====
The main challenge that faces any nation because of climate change is its direct effect on food security. In this sense, Africa is listed as the most vulnerable continent to climate changes. In Ethiopia for example, food production faces a lot of challenges because of climate change. It is noted that there is an increase in the annual production losses to climate changes from year to year.

Agriculture is expected to be negatively impacted by droughts, reduced rainfall, pests, and other changes in the environment due to climate change. Higher temperatures in South Africa and less rainfall will result in limited water resources and changing soil moisture, leading to decreased cropland productivity.

Some predictions show surface water supply could decrease by 60% by the year 2070 in parts of the Western Cape. To reverse the damage caused by land mismanagement, the government has supported a scheme which promotes sustainable development and the use of natural resources.

Maize production, which contributes to a 36% majority of the gross value of South Africa's field crops, has also experienced negative effects due to climate change. The estimated value of the loss, which takes into consideration scenarios with and without the carbon dioxide fertilization effect, ranges between tens and hundreds of millions of rand.

==== Tourism ====
South Africa has an important tourism aspect to look at and give considerable attention to when considering climate change impact. This is a sensitive sector to mention but its importance lies in its vulnerability to climate change that is growing lately. Challenges exceed the fact that there is a need to pave the way for more tourists to come. South Africa's main concern extends to develop poverty mitigation plans resulted from climate change in South Africa. Tourism urged policy makers in Africa to improve job opportunities, economical growth and support different industries. There are different critical challenges facing Tourism sector in South Africa and that was mainly a result of Climate Change effects. In this regard, it is important to notice that the national government in South Africa started to implement new tourism and climate based policies to over come the challenges. It is significant to mention that the general climate in South Africa suffers from varied conditions and changes/ These variations target summer and winter rainfall regions, subtropical areas, and both humid and arid regions.

=== Health impacts ===
There is evidence that climate change will have negative impacts on public health in South Africa, especially due to the high proportion of vulnerable people. There is already a high burden of disease in South Africa linked to environmental stressors and climate change will exacerbate many of these social and environmental issues. Climate change is projected to threaten public health through increased heat stress, rises in vector-borne diseases and infectious diseases, worsening extreme weather events, a decline in food security, and increased mental health stress. A 2019 survey of literature on adaptation and public health, found that "the volume and quality of research is disappointing, and disproportionate to the threat posed by climate change in South Africa.".

== Mitigation ==
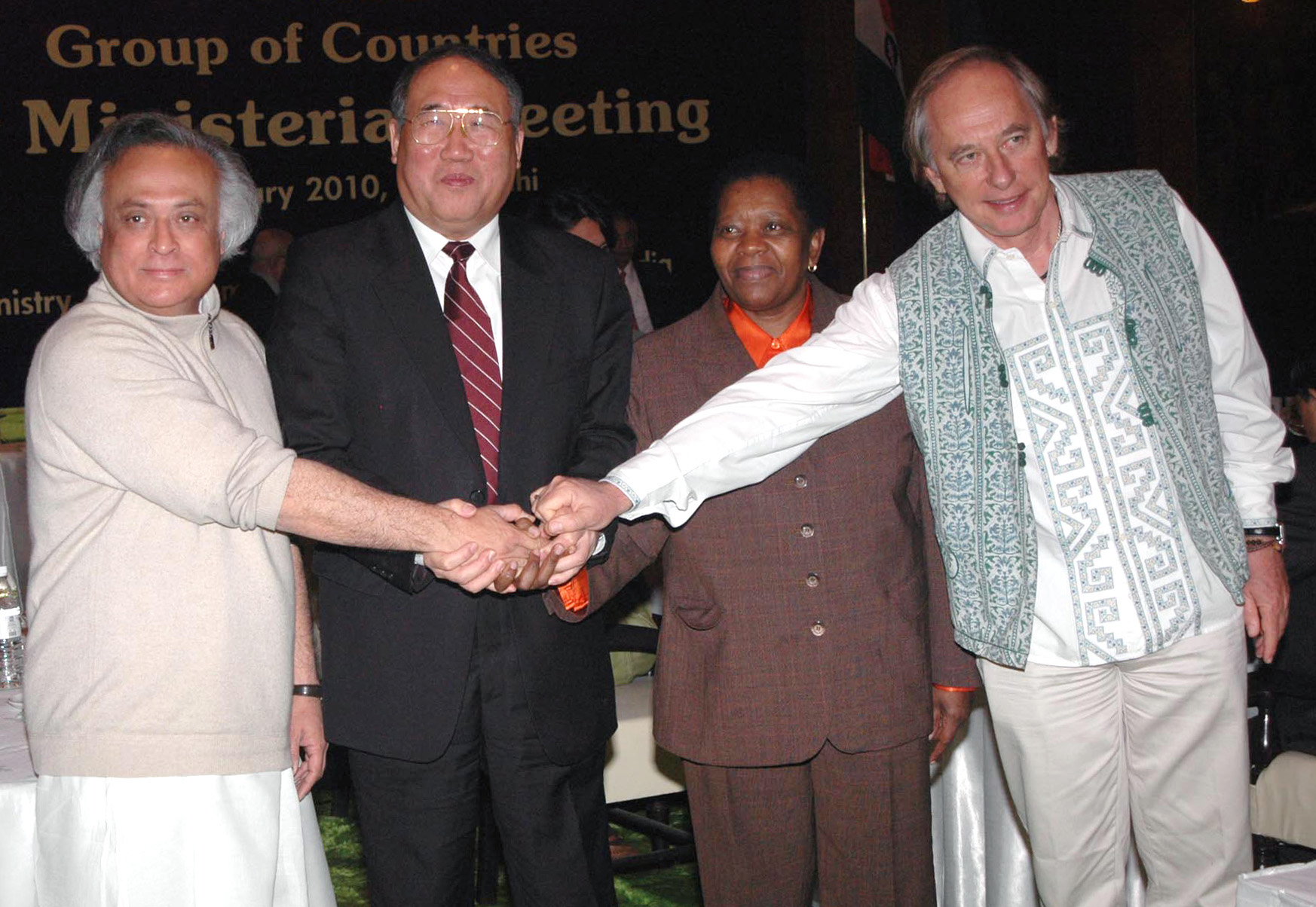
A 2010 meeting of the environment ministers of the BASIC countries, including South Africa, to discuss climate change following COP15

The South African government has committed to a peak of CO_{2} emissions between 2020 and 2025. South Africa has agreed to working with other signatories of the Paris Agreement to keep temperature increases below 2 °C. However, independent observers have called the current actions by the government insufficient. In part, this failure to act is related to the government ownership of Eskom, which is responsible for much of the coal operation in the country. Similarly, the economy is one of the most energy-intensive in the world although it has not been setting mitigation targets for industry. Catalysing finance and investment to transition to a low-carbon economy and society is a major challenge for South Africa.

Like all countries which are party to the Paris Agreement South Africa will report its greenhouse gas inventory to the UNFCCC at least biennially from 2024 at the latest.

The European Investment Bank Global and the Development Bank of Southern Africa have agreed to a €200 million loan to support a new targeted financing initiative aimed at unlocking €400 million for private sector renewable energy investment in South Africa.

In 2007, Conservation International–South Africa (which later became Conservation South Africa) helped establish the Climate Action Partnership, a multi-organisation programme focused on climate-change adaptation and mitigation.

== Adaptation ==
The South African government drafted its National Climate Change Adaptation Strategy (NCCAS) in 2019. This strategy presents a vision for adapting to climate change and increasing resilience in the country. This strategy also and outlines priority areas for achieving this vision, which includes water resources, agriculture and commercial forestry, health, biodiversity and ecosystems, human settlements, and disaster risk reduction. This strategy was also developed to act on the country's commitment to its obligations in the Paris Agreement under the United Nations Framework Convention on Climate Change (UNFCCC).

South Africa is in the progress of finalizing its national climate change adaptation strategy. "The National Adaptation strategy acts as a common reference point for climate change adaptation efforts in South Africa, and it provides a platform upon which national climate change adaptation objectives for the country can be articulated so as to provide overarching guidance to all sectors of the economy"

== Society and culture ==
=== Activism ===
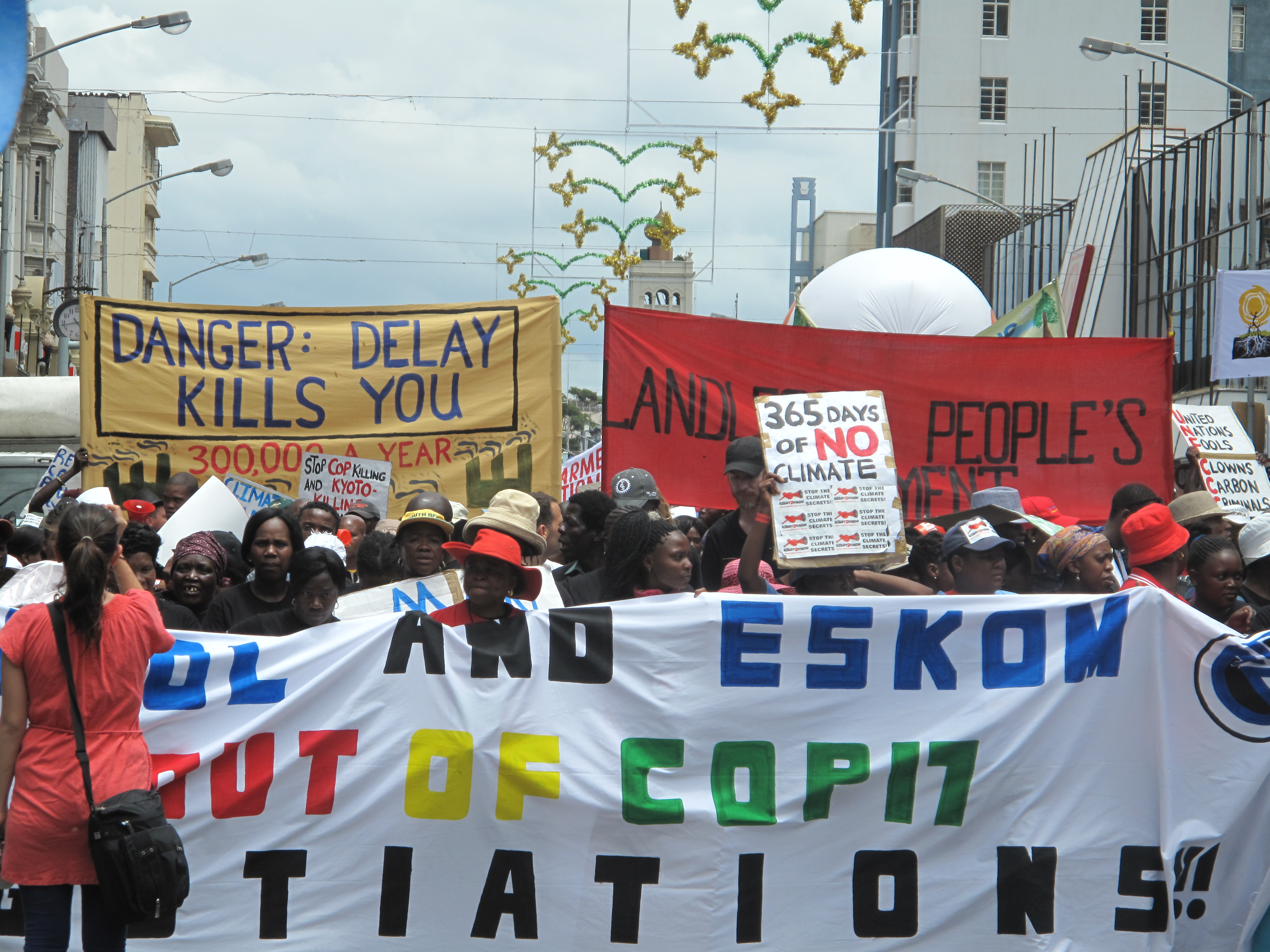
Global Day of Action protests in Durban, 2011

Amid the 2011 UN Climate Change Conference (COP17) held in Durban, demonstrations and protests were organized to raise concerns on climate change issues. A march gathering 12,000 people urged the delegates at COP17 to take urgent climate action. Protesters also made an intrusion into the conference venue at the time when the negotiations were at the deadlock.

=== Public awareness ===
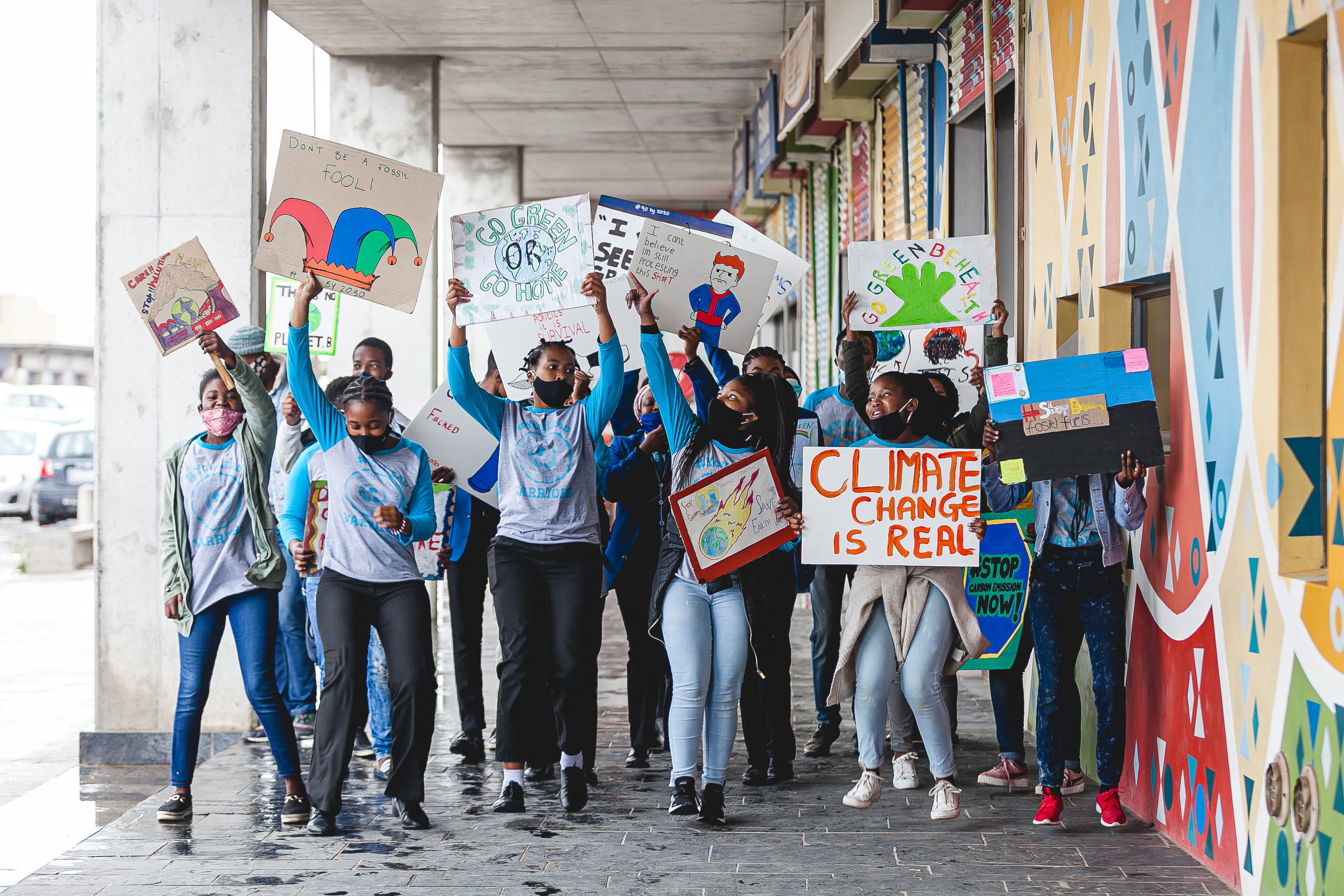
Youth climate change protesters in South Africa, 2020

Popular awareness of these potential impacts increased with the 2018–20 Southern Africa drought, the Cape Town water crisis, and the 2022 KZN floods.

== See also ==
- Climate change in Africa
- Plug-in electric vehicles in South Africa
- Environmental movement in South Africa
