= ECOPEACE Party =

Political party in South Africa

- Founded: 1995
- Headquarters: 101 Queen City, 54 Queen Street, Durban, South Africa
- Ideology: Environmentalism
- Political position: Left-wing
- Regional affiliation: Federation of Green Parties of Africa (Observer)

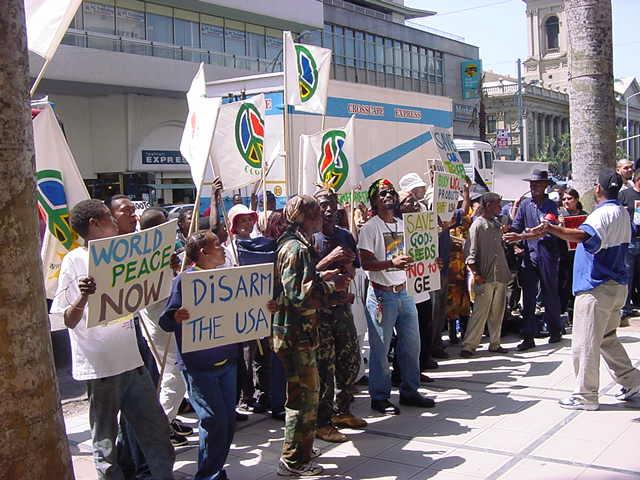
ECOPEACE participating in an anti-war protest outside the American consulate in Durban on 16 October 2002, the United Nations Food Security Day and global Anti–McDonald's Day

The ECOPEACE Party is a national environmentalist political party in South Africa founded in 1995. The party was formerly known as eThekwini ECOPEACE and eThekwini Ecoparty—eThekwini is the Zulu name for Durban, where the party is based. The Zulu party motto is Buhlakuleni uButhi, Yitshaleni iMithi, which translates to "Uproot Poisons, Replant Trees (or Medicine)".

== History ==
ECOPEACE entered municipal elections in 1996 but failed to win a seat. In 2000 it won one seat in the eThekwini Municipal Council; this was the only Green seat in South Africa. ECOPEACE was not re-elected in the 2006 local elections, but its sister organisation Operation Khanyisa Movement (OKM), a fellow member of the Socialist Green Coalition (SGC) gained a seat in the Johannesburg City Council that year.

Although ECOPEACE is environmentalist in the broadest meaning of seeking sustainability of natural, built, social, economic, and political aspects etc. Global climate disruption and renewable energy production are major concerns.

== Ideology ==
=== Core beliefs ===
==== Peace ====
The party is anti-war, and supports peace based on freedom, equality, and justice for humans and the environment.

==== Sustainability ====
ECOPEACE is dedicated to environmental sustainability in areas such as economics, land development, and energy policy.

==== Consensus ====
The party supports consensus decision making, as expressed in practices such as parliamentary reforms and participatory, direct, and consensus democracy. In order to strengthen voter influence and accountability of public officials, ECOPEACE supports the right of recall of elected officials and transparency in campaign finance.

==== Science ====
The party sees rational science as a necessary component of informing political action and finding remedies for dangers to society and the environment, though it opposes the abuse of science to advance specific political goals.

=== Energy policy ===
The party opposes attempts by the ANC government and the DA opposition to continue financing of fossil carbon exploration and extraction, such as fracking in the Karoo, offshore drilling, and creation of new coal mines, even near the Cradle of Humankind where the danger of acid mine drainage exists. ECOPEACE contends that these parties dedicate only token sums to renewable energy and support policies which worsen global climate disruptions.

As an alternative, ECOPEACE supports changes in environmental policy and challenges against wealth concentration, such as the Great Transition. The party's ideal energy policy would involve a distributed mix of wind and solar power, with storage on a smart grid. Other renewable technologies would supplement these primary sources, such as biogas, ocean power, and tidal power. In particular, ECOPEACE supports ocean thermal energy conversion (OTEC), a renewable energy technique with the potential to mitigate global climate disruption and mass extinction of marine life by taking heat directly out of oceans.

== Criticism ==
The ANC government has threatened to revoke the electoral position of the ECOPEACE Party for protesting against the eThekwini Municipal Council, together with community members from Merebank; ECOPEACE helped elect Merebank local councillor Raja Naidoo, who was later assassinated.

== Affiliations ==
ECOPEACE is a member of the Socialist Green Coalition.

== See also ==
- Democratic Left Front
- Environmental governance
- Green movement in South Africa
