= Baltic Sea Parliamentary Conference =

Forum for political dialogue

- Nickname: BSPC
- Purpose: Forum for political dialogue between parliamentarians from the Baltic Sea Region
- Headquarters: Schwerin
- Official language: English
- President: Kristina Herbst
- Vice-President: Henrik Møller, Alfons Röblom
- Website: bspc.net

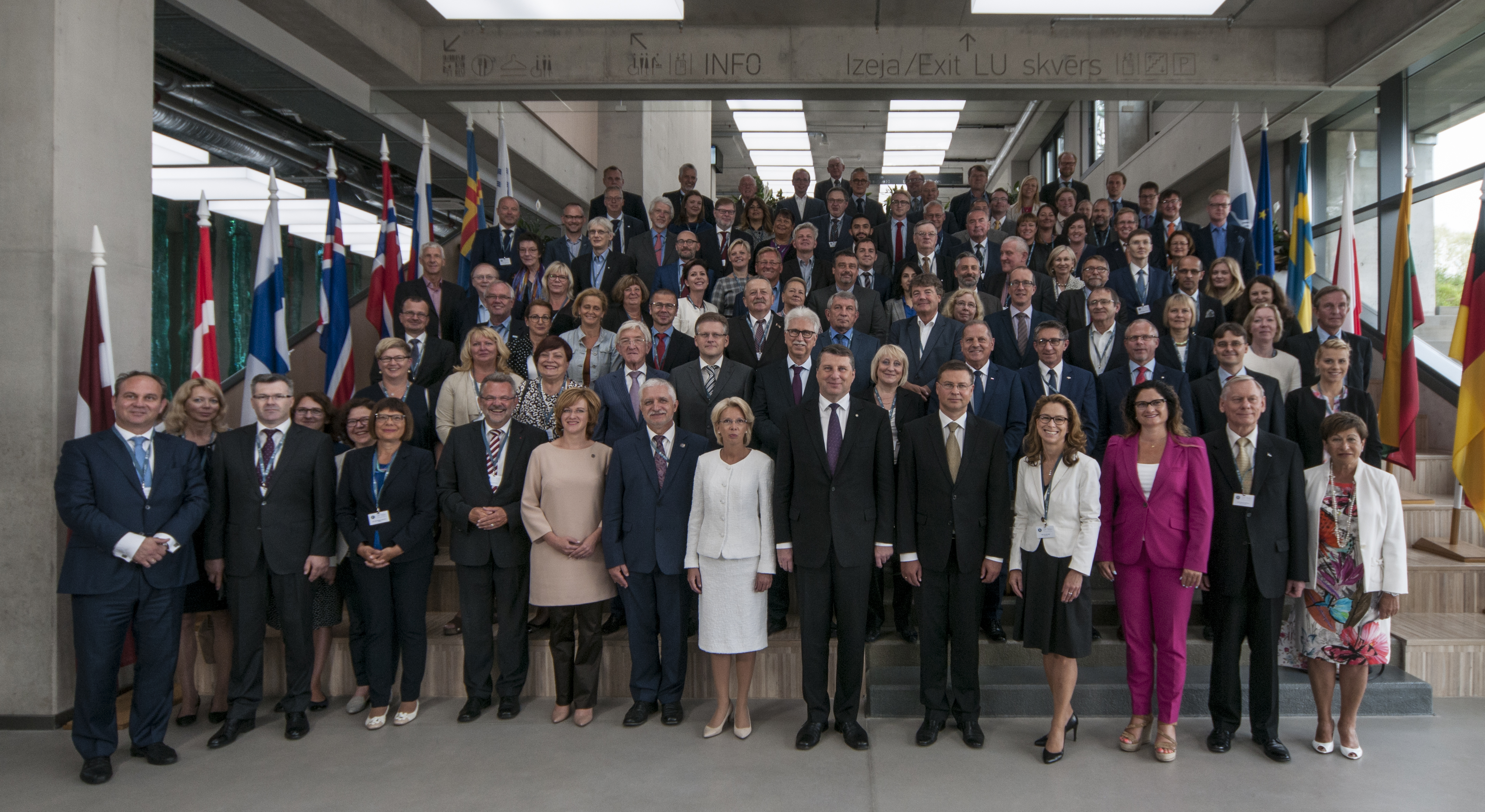
25. BSPC in Riga

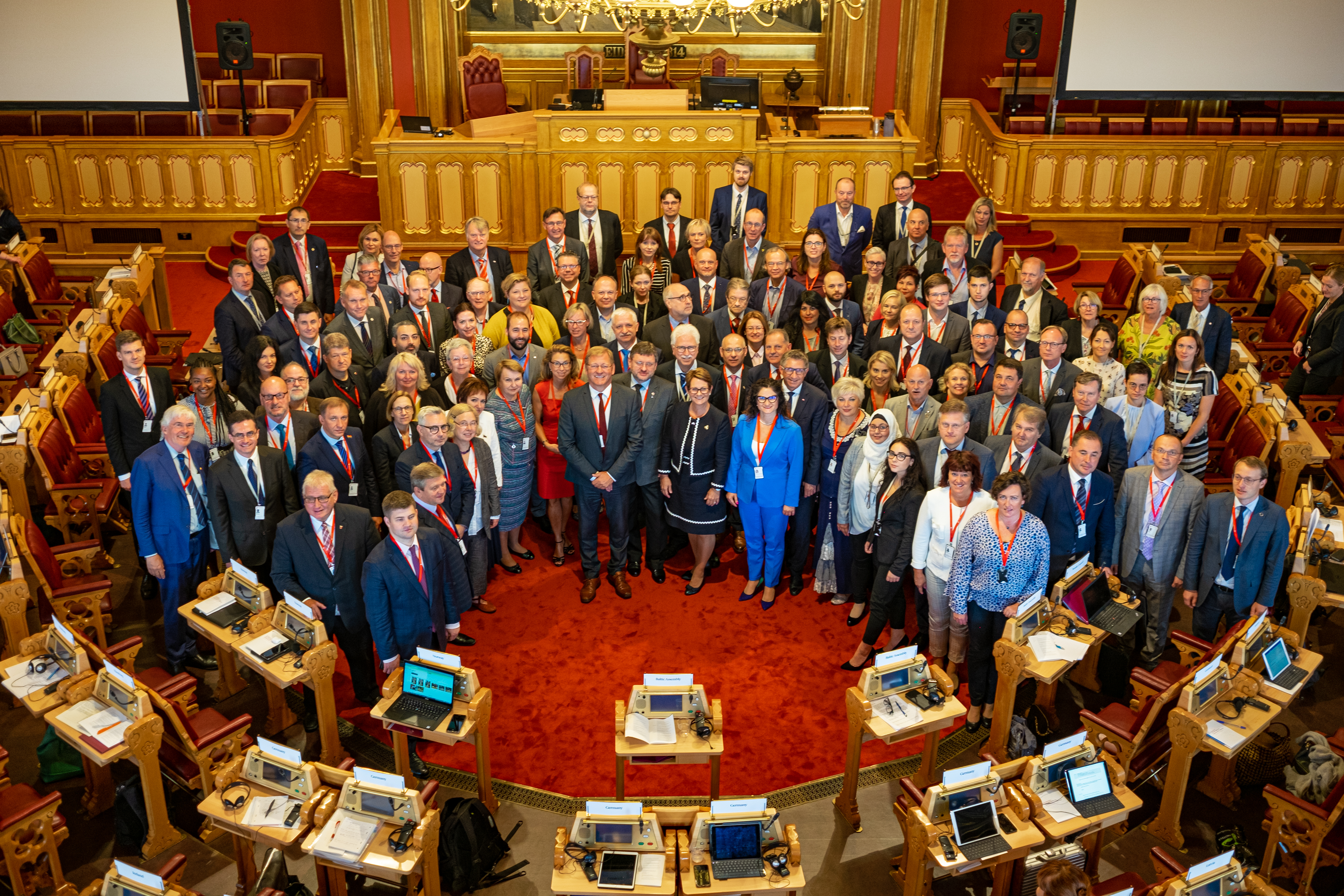
28. BSPC in Oslo

The Baltic Sea Parliamentary Conference (BSPC) was established in 1991 as a forum for political dialogue between parliamentarians from the Baltic Sea Region. BSPC aims at raising awareness and opinion on issues of current political interest and relevance for the Baltic Sea Region. It promotes and drives various initiatives and efforts to support a sustainable environmental, social and economic development of the Baltic Sea Region. It strives at enhancing the visibility of the Baltic Sea Region and its issues in a wider European context.

== History ==
BSPC external interfaces include parliamentary, governmental, sub-regional and other organizations in the Baltic Sea Region and the Northern Dimension area, among them CBSS, HELCOM, the Northern Dimension Partnership in Health and Social Well-Being (NDPHS), the Baltic Sea Labour Network (BSLN), the Baltic Sea States Sub-regional Cooperation (BSSSC) and the Baltic Development Forum.

BSPC shall initiate and guide political activities in the region; support and strengthen democratic institutions in the participating states; improve dialogue between governments, parliaments and civil society; strengthen the common identity of the Baltic Sea Region by means of close co-operation between national and regional parliaments on the basis of equality; and initiate and guide political activities in the Baltic Sea Region, endowing them with additional democratic legitimacy and parliamentary authority.

The political recommendations of the annual Parliamentary Conferences are expressed in a Conference Resolution adopted by consensus by the Conference. The adopted Resolution shall be submitted to the governments of the Baltic Sea region, the CBSS and the EU, and disseminated to other relevant national, regional and local stakeholders in the Baltic Sea region and its neighbourhood.

=== The beginning 1991 ===
The 1st Baltic Sea Parliamentary Conference was held in Helsinki on 7–9 January 1991, on the initiative of the President of the Finnish Parliament, Mr Kalevi Sorsa. The title was the Parliamentary Conference on Cooperation in the Baltic Sea Area. Six successive Conferences had the English name of the “Parliamentary Conference on Cooperation in the Baltic Sea Area”. The 7th Parliamentary Conference replaced the word “Area” with “Region”. The Conference was renamed by the 8th Conference as the “Baltic Sea Parliamentary Conference”.

The 1st Conference was attended by parliamentary delegations from Denmark, Estonia, Greenland, Hamburg, Iceland, Karelia, Finland, Lithuania, Latvia, Mecklenburg-Vorpommern, Norway, Poland, Schleswig-Holstein, Sweden, the Åland Islands, the Faroe Islands, and the USSR. Observers were sent by the U.N. European Economic Conference, EFTA, the Helsinki Committee, the Interparliamentary Union, the Nordic Council, and the Council of Europe. Some of the subjects discussed at the Conference were proposed after earlier consultations (a preparatory meeting was held in Helsinki on 13 September 1990) but a number of other issues were discussed at the Conference forum. This gave the Conference the character of a working meeting that identified problems in the Baltic Sea Region needing swift action. Talks held during the Conference concentrated on four subjects: economy, ecology, culture, and politics. The economic discussions were dominated by issues relating to the transition of former communist bloc countries to market economies and the economic reforms in the Soviet Union. It was emphasised that the economic development of the Baltic States and the Leningrad area was vital to the region's integration and that the West should develop an appropriate mechanism for assisting those areas. The speakers expressed their hope for a rapid opening of the East to a capitalist economy, e. g. through free economic zones. However, they also emphasised that political stability free from armed conflicts is a precondition of development. During the debate on environmental protection, the invited experts presented the situation regarding the contamination of the Baltic Sea waters. This made clear to the Conference participants that ecosystems are not divided by political boundaries and that any measures to improve the natural conditions could be only be successful though joint action. Consequently, solution of ecological problems requires not only technological solutions but also political will and broad understanding. The participants called for urgent action to prevent contamination increasing in the Baltic region. They proposed a number of concrete measures, such as a joint system of taxes and fines for environmental pollution or signing a convention on the reduction of harmful substances added to the fuel of ships using the Baltic Sea.

The Conference also pointed out the importance of developing cooperation in the fields of education and culture. The participants voiced their hope that this cooperation would enable Northern Europe to be a model for coexistence within and between regions and ethnic minorities. The Nordic Council reported a number of initiatives intended to intensify cooperation with the Baltic States: the Council opened its information centres in the capitals of those countries, and the Danish Culture Institute did the same in Riga. At the same time, Estonia, Lithuania, and Latvia opened similar centres in Copenhagen. The political debate was dominated by developments in the Baltic States. Their representatives strongly protested against measures taken by the USSR authorities, and other delegates, especially the representatives from Denmark, voiced similar opinions. The discussion also concerned the security issue in the region, the proposed Nordic nuclear weaponfree zone, and cooperation to combat international crime. There was also a proposal to establish a Baltic Sea Council that would compile plans for cooperation in the region, initially in the fields of culture and economy, and later in areas such as technology, power industry, and education. This proposal was soon implemented. In autumn 1991, Denmark and Germany, considering economic and political stabilisation of the Baltic Sea Region, proposed an initiative to establish a new international organisation at governmental level. The Foreign Ministers of Denmark, Estonia, Finland, Lithuania, Latvia, Germany, Norway, Poland, Russia and Sweden, as well as representatives of the European Commission met in Copenhagen on 5–6 March 1992. They set up the Council of Baltic Sea States, an organisation to build up democratic institutions in the region and cooperate on matters of economy, culture, environmental protection, nuclear security, and social affairs. The council is now one of the most important players for international cooperation in the region. The Conference did not produce any formal conclusions or a resolution, but it should be considered as extremely important because of its groundbreaking character. The variety of regional development concepts presented at the Conference provided a basis for further debate and cooperation between the states and regions concerned.

On May 16, 2022, the Russian State Duma announced its withdrawal from the Baltic Parliamentary Conference.

== Structure ==
Map of the members of the Baltic Sea Parliamentary Conference

BSPC gathers parliamentarians from 11 national parliaments, 11 regional parliaments and 5 parliamentary organizations around the Baltic Sea. The BSPC thus constitutes a unique parliamentary bridge between all the EU- and non-EU countries of the Baltic Sea Region.

=== Members ===
Country name	Arms	Flag	Membership	Parliament	Membership status	Represented since	Members	EU relation	NATO relation
Denmark	Denmark	(Denmark)	full	Folketing	sovereign state	1991	5	(Europe) member	(NATO) member
Estonia	Estonia	(Estonia)	full	Riigikogu	sovereign state	1991		(Europe) member	(NATO) member
Finland	Finland	(Finland)	full	Eduskunta	sovereign state			(Europe) member	(NATO) member
Germany	Germany	(Germany)	full	Bundestag	sovereign state			(Europe) member	(NATO) member
Iceland	Iceland	(Iceland)	full	Alþingi	sovereign state	1991		associate	(NATO) member
Latvia	Latvia	(Latvia)	full	Saeima	sovereign state	1991		(Europe) member	(NATO) member
Lithuania	Lithuania	(Lithuania)	full	Seimas	sovereign state	1991		(Europe) member	(NATO) member
Norway	Norway	(Norway)	full	Storting	sovereign state	1991		associate	(NATO) member
Poland	Poland	(Poland)	full	Parliament of Poland	sovereign state			(Europe) member	(NATO) member
Sweden	Sweden	(Sweden)	full	Riksdag	sovereign state	1991		(Europe) member	partnership
Åland	Åland	(Åland)	full	Lagting	self-governing region of Finland	1991		(Europe) territory	demilitarized zone
Bremen	Bremen	(Bremen (state))	full	Bürgerschaft	States of Germany			(Europe) territory	(NATO) member
Faroe Islands	Faroe Islands	(Faroe Islands)	full	Løgting	self-governing region of the Unity of the Realm	1991		minimal	(NATO) member
Greenland	Greenland	(Greenland)	full	Inatsisartut	self-governing region of the Unity of the Realm	1991		OCT	(NATO) member
Hamburg	Hamburg	(Hamburg)	full	Bürgerschaft	States of Germany			(Europe) territory	(NATO) member
Mecklenburg-Vorpommern	Mecklenburg-Vorpommern	(Mecklenburg-Vorpommern)	full	Landtag	States of Germany	1991		(Europe) territory	(NATO) member
Schleswig-Holstein	Schleswig-Holstein	(Schleswig-Holstein)	full	Landtag	States of Germany	1991		(Europe) territory	(NATO) member

St Petersburg, Kaliningrad, Karelia, Leningrad - do these need to be added?

=== Observers ===
- Adrian-Ionian Initiative (AII)
- Standing Committee of Parliamentarians of the Arctic Region (SCPAR)
- Baltic Council of Ministers
- Baltic Development Forum (BDF)
- Baltic Sea Commission (CPMR)
- Baltic Sea Forum – Pro Baltica
- Baltic Sea Region University Network (BSRUN)
- Baltic Sea States Sub-Regional Co-operation (BSSSC)
- Baltic Sea Youth Forum
- Inter-Parliamentary Assembly of the Commonwealth of Independent States (CIS-IPA)
- Council of Baltic Sea States (CBSS)
- Conference of Community and European Affairs Committees of Parliaments of the European Union (COSAC) Secretariat
- European Commission
- FUEN (Federal Union of European nationalities)
- Helsinki Commission (HELCOM)
- Inter-Parliamentary Union (IPU)
- NGO Forum
- Nordic Council of Ministers
- Parliamentary Association of North-West Russia (PANWR)
- Parliamentary Assembly of the Black Sea Economic Co-operation (PABSEC)
- Baltic Sea Trade Union Network (BASTUN)
- Union of the Baltic Cities (UBC)
- Nordic Investment Bank (NiB)
- Nordic Environment Finance Corporation (NEFCO)
- Northern Dimension Partnership in Public Health and Social Well-being (NDPHS)
- Skåne Regional County Council
- South-East European Cooperation Process (SEECP)

== Conference ==
Baltic Sea Parliamentary Conference

Nr.	City	Country	Date
1	Helsinki	Finland	7.-9.1.1991
2	Oslo	Norway	22.-24.4.1992
3	Warsaw	Poland	5.-6.5.1994
4	Rønne	Denmark	12.-13.9.1995
5	Riga	Latvia	10.-11.9.1996
6	Gdańsk	Poland	15.-16.9.1997
7	Lübeck	Germany	7.-8.9.1998
8	Mariehamn	Åland Islands	7.-8.9.1999
9	Malmö	Sweden	4.-5.9.2000
10	Greifswald	Germany	3.-4.9.2001
11	Saint Petersburg	Russia	30.9.-1.10.2002
12	Oulu	Finland	7.-9.9.2003
13	Bergen	Norway	29.-31.8.2004
14	Vilnius	Lithuania	29.-30.8.2005
15	Reykjavík	Iceland	3.-5.9.2006
16	Berlin	Germany	27.-28.8.2007
17	Visby	Sweden	1.-2.9.2008
18	Nyborg	Denmark	31.8.-1.9.2009
19	Mariehamn	Åland Islands	29.-31.8.2010
20	Helsinki	Finland	28.-30.8.2011
21	Saint Petersburg	Russia	26.-28.8.2012
22	Pärnu	Estonia	25.-27.8.2013
23	Olsztyn	Poland	24.-26.8.2014
24	Rostock	Germany	31.8.-1.9.2015
25	Riga	Latvia	28.-30.8.2016
26	Hamburg	Germany	3.-5.9.2017
27	Mariehamn	Åland Islands	26.-28.8.2018
28	Oslo	Norway	25.-27.8.2019
29	Vilnius	Lithuania	24.8.2020 (only Online)
30	Stockholm	Sweden	29.-31.8.2021

== See also ==
- Arctic Cooperation and Politics
- Baltic region
- Baltoscandia
- Council of the Baltic Sea States
- European Union
- Nordic-Baltic Eight
- Nordic Council Film Prize
- Nordic Council Music Prize
- Nordic Council's Literature Prize
- Nordic Passport Union
- Nordic countries
- West Nordic Council
- Southern Baltic Sea Parliamentary Forum
