= Southern Baltic Sea Parliamentary Forum =

Forum

Southern Baltic Sea Parliamentary Forum

The Southern Baltic Sea Parliamentary Forum was founded in 2004 as a forum for the regional parliaments of Schleswig-Holstein, Hamburg, Mecklenburg-Western Pomerania (Mecklenburg-Vorpommern), West Pomerania (Westpommern), Pomerania (Pommern), Warmia-Masuria (Ermland-Masuren) and the administrative district of Kaliningrad. The regional parliament of the southern Swedish province Schonen is an associated Member.

== Background ==
The already existing bilateral relations between the regional parliaments of Schleswig-Holstein and Mecklenburg-Western Pomerania and the regional parliaments of Pomerania and West Pomerania were the starting point of the Southern Baltic Sea Parliamentary Forum.

The decision to form a parliamentary partnership was already taken in 2001 by the regional parliament of Schleswig-Holstein and the regional parliament of Pomerania. The parliaments made a commitment to cooperate especially in terms of European-, Baltic-, minority- and regional politics. In 2004 those two institutions decided to build a parliamentary partnership with the goal to form a network of parliamentary relations along the coast of the southern baltic sea.

The regional parliament of Mecklenburg-Western Pomerania already had intensive relations with the regional parliaments of Pomerania and West Pomerania before the parliamentary forum was founded.

In 1996, a meeting of parliamentarians took place in Krugsdorf (Germany). Representatives of the regional parliament of Mecklenburg-Western Pomerania, the European Parliament, the association of the local community Pomerania, the Mecklenburg-Western Pomerania Association of Counties, the regional parliament of the voivodship of Stettin and representatives of the local association of the communities in Western Pomerania took part in this conference. In the years from 1997 to 2004 meetings of representatives of parliamentary expert groups took place for a bilateral exchange of information. The main subjects of discussion were economy, tourism and the handling of the custom stations. In 2001, a partnership agreement was signed by the regional parliament of Mecklenburg-Western Pomerania and the regional parliament of Western Pomerania. In 2004, the declaration of the regional parliaments of Mecklenburg-Western Pomerania and of Pomerania followed.

In 2004, Poland joined the EU. This led to an intensification of parliamentary relations. The central subject was the European funding policy but also the perspectives of young people in this region that now was free of a constructed border.

This development was also a topic of the conference about „The perspectives of border crossing cooperation in the southern Baltic after the eastward expansion of the EU“ which took place in October 2003 in Schwerin. Representatives of the regional parliaments of Schleswig-Holstein, Mecklenburg-Western Pomerania, West Pomerania and Pomerania participated in the conference. In the course of the following conference from 25 to 27 April 2004 in Gdańsk, the “Southern Baltic Sea Parliamentary Forum” was founded. The forum had the goal to connect and coordinate the bilateral relations that already existed between the four regional parliaments. The good bilateral relations between Germany and Poland were the basis for the “Southern Baltic Sea Parliamentary Forum“ that was founded in 2004. From that point onwards, the parliamentary cooperation was taken to a multilateral level.

Subsequently, the regional parliaments of Warmia-Masuria and of the “Oblast of Kaliningrad“ joined the Southern Baltic Sea Parliamentary Forum in 2008 as well as the free Hanseatic City of Hamburg in 2009. The southern Swedish region “Schonen“ joined the forum as an associated partner in 2005.

== Subjects ==
The Southern Baltic Sea Parliamentary Forum regularly deals with subjects that specifically affect the region. The regional parliaments have frequently addressed demands about certain issues of economy and structural politics, as well as the topics energy supply, scientific research, tourism and culture to the relevant actors in the southern Baltic region.

During the 4th Southern Baltic Sea Parliamentary Forum from 21 to 23 Mai 2006 in Kiel, an EU strategy for the Baltic sea region was discussed with view to the Green book of the European Commission for a future EU maritime strategy. So the gathering was meant to create a European agenda for the future sea politics of the EU in the southern Baltic. The forum considered an integrated, interdisciplinary and holistic EU maritime policy, which considers the opposing ecological and economic interests in the southern Baltic region, as necessary.

== Milestones ==
The increasing integration of European policies has increasingly influenced the work of the parliamentary forum. In 2007, the European Commission created an action plan for an integrated maritime policy. Subsequently, the parliamentary forum dealt on a regular basis with the measures announced in the action plan, e.g. the support of intersectionary clusters or the competitiveness of maritime transport. So the main topic of the 7th parliamentary forum which took place in Schwerin was “The implementation of European strategies in the southern Baltic”. From then onwards, the parliamentary forum had significantly supported the development of the EU strategy for the Baltic sea region and made comprehensive contributions in the consultation process. Additionally, it was decided to evaluate the policies resulting from the EU strategy on a yearly basis. Mecklenburg-Western Pomerania is particularly active as the coordinator for the tourism policies. The main topic of the 9th Southern Baltic Sea Parliamentary Forum in Gdańsk was the EU strategy for the Baltic sea region. The 13th parliamentary forum took place from 20 to 21 April 2015 in Hamburg. It mainly dealt with “Science and university cooperation in the Baltic sea area”. The 14th parliamentary forum with the topic “Agriculture, fishery and food industry – Innovation and cooperation in the southern Baltic region” took place from 12 to 14 June 2016 in Kiel.

== List of conferences and topics ==
| Nr. | | | | |
|---|---|---|---|---|
| 1. | Pomerania | Gdańsk | 2004 | |
| 2. | West Pomerania | Misdroy | 2004 | Regional structural, tourism and youth politics |
| 3. | Mecklenburg-Western Pomerania | Binz | 2005 | Tourism, Youth policies and integrated maritime policy |
| 4. | Schleswig-Holstein | Kiel | 2006 | Integrated maritime policy, maritime economy, science and ecology |
| 5. | Pomerania | Gdynia | 2007 | Tradition and innovation in the Baltic Sea region |
| 6. | West Pomerania | Kolobrzeg | 2008 | Science as an integration factor and chance for economic development in the Southern Baltic |
| 7. | Mecklenburg-Western Pomerania | Schwerin | 2009 | The implementation of European strategies in the southern Baltic |
| 8. | Warmia-Masuria | Elbing | 2010 | Ecosystem Southern Baltic – development in harmony with the environment |
| 9. | Pomerania | Gdańsk | 2011 | Assessment of the EU-Baltic Sea Strategy |
| 10. | Schleswig-Holstein | Kiel | 2012 | Regional development strategy Southern Baltic 2020 |
| 11. | Mecklenburg-Western Pomerania | Schwerin | 2013 | Renewable energies, infrastructure, tourism, integrated maritime policies, blue growth, youth, culture |
| 12. | Oblast Kaliningrad | Kaliningrad | 2014 | Tourism cooperation |
| 13. | Free and Hanseatic City of Hamburg | Hamburg | 2015 | Science and university cooperation in the Baltic sea region |
| 14. | Schleswig-Holstein | Kiel | 2016 | Agriculture, fishery and food industry |

== Functioning ==
The delegates of the participating regional parliaments, the associated partners and representatives from politics, science and economy come together yearly in the Southern Baltic Sea Parliamentary Forum to discuss the subjects that effect the region and to elaborate on recommendations in these matters. The nominated experts give the parliamentarians scientific support with view to the forum's topics. These topics are the foundation for the resolutions in which the delegates express demands to the relevant actors in the southern Baltic region. Following the annual conference, the regional parliament of Mecklenburg-Western Pomerania has implemented the resolutions regularly with a parliamentary resolution on the basis of a joint proposal of the democratic parliamentary groups.

The actual members of the Southern Baltic Sea Parliamentary Forum are the regional parliaments of Mecklenburg-Western Pomerania, Hamburg, Schleswig-Holstein, West Pomerania, Pomerania and Warmia-Masuria as well as the administrative district of Kaliningrad. The southern Swedish province of Schonen is an associated Partner.

The delegates regularly establish working groups to prepare the annual conferences and to elaborate on the actual issues with experts.

Working groups were established in the past to deal inter alia with the topics “Integrated EU maritime policies”, “Baltic sea strategies” and “Energy supply”. The region Mecklenburg-Western Pomerania presided in the working group “Energy supply” which was established at the 5th Parliamentary forum in 2007. The expert committees of the regional parliaments participating in the forum came together in Schwerin and Stettin to work on recommendations concerning the energy policies of the members of the forum together with international experts.

A unique aspect of the Southern Baltic Sea Parliamentary Forum is the participation of young people in the conferences. Just like the parliamentarians the young people discuss subjects affecting the region and make recommendations to the delegates. At the 3rd forum that took place from 18 to 20 September 2005 in Binz, the transnational youth project “youth, region and parliament” was initiated. This project gives young people the opportunity to intern in the office of a parliamentarian. This way, young people get an idea of how parliaments in the different regions and countries work and get to know the other country.

== See also ==
- Baltic Sea Parliamentary Conference
- Baltic region
- Baltoscandia
- Council of the Baltic Sea States
- European Union
- Nordic-Baltic Eight
- Nordic Council Film Prize
- Nordic Council Music Prize
- Nordic Council's Literature Prize
- Nordic Passport Union
- Nordic countries
- West Nordic Council
