= Vehicle registration plates of Sweden =

Kingdom of Sweden
- A plate from 2010 to 2013, ABC 123.
- Country: Sweden
- Country code: S

Current series
- Size: 520 mm × 110 mm 20.5 in × 4.3 in
- Serial format: ABC 123 or ABC 12A
- Colour (front): Black on white
- Colour (rear): Black on white

History
- First issued: 1972
- Last issued: 2019

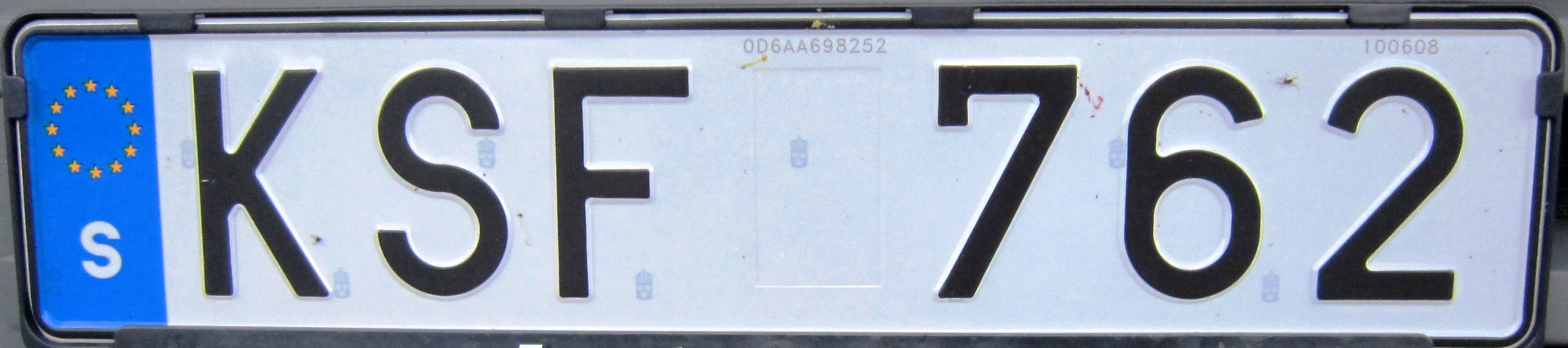
A plate from 2010 to 2013 (no sticker needed)

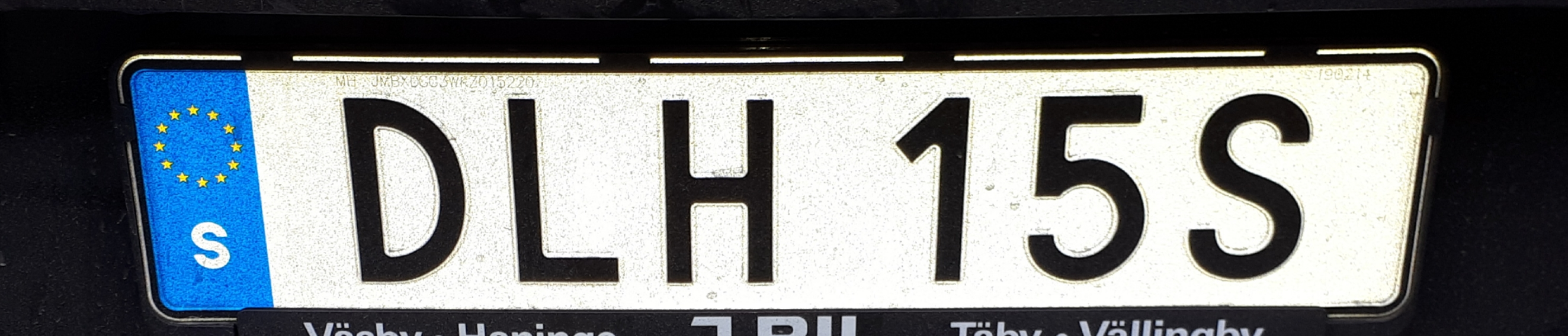
A plate from 2019 with format, ABC 12A

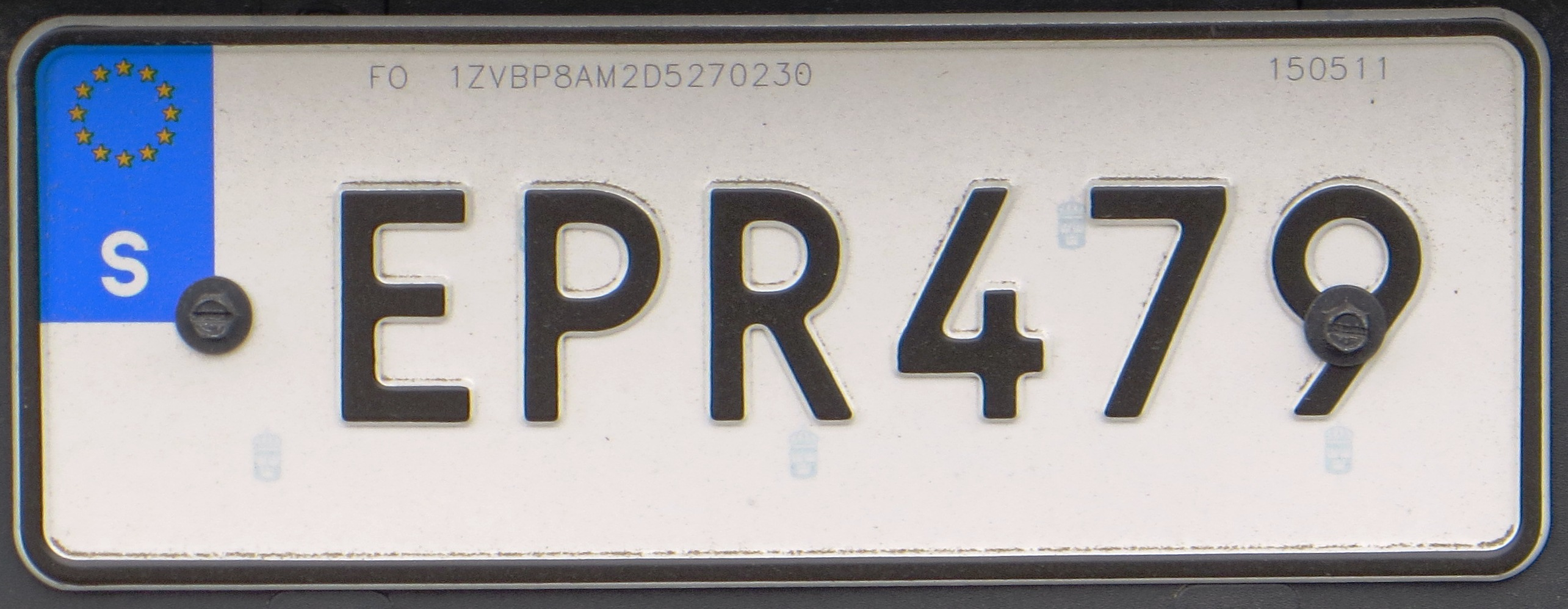
North American-style shortened Swedish license plate

In Sweden, vehicle registration plates (Swedish: registreringsskylt) are used for most types of vehicles. They have three letters first, a space and two digits and one digit or letter after (e.g. ABC 123 or ABC 12A). The combination is mostly a random number and has no connection with a geographic location. The last digit is used to show what month the vehicle tax has to be paid, and before 2018 it was also used to show what month the car had to undergo vehicle inspection. Vehicles like police cars, fire trucks, public buses and trolley buses use the same type of plate as normal private cars and cannot be directly distinguished by the plate alone. Military vehicles have special plates. Part of the vehicle data is public and can be retrieved online.

== Ordinary plates ==
Ordinary plates have black text on a white background. They consist of three letters first, a space, two digits and one more digit or letter. The space was formerly used for a taxation sticker, and on newer plates the space is narrower. Above it a manufacturer code and the vehicle identification number (VIN) are printed and above the last digit the date of plate manufacture is printed. All vehicles must legally carry both a front and a rear plate except for motorcycles, trailers (rear only), tractors and other off-road machinery (front only).

The registration number is tied to the vehicle's VIN and remains unchanged, even after change of ownership, until the vehicle is scrapped or exported. It is possible to decommission a registered vehicle for any length of time. A decommissioned registered vehicle does not require road tax or a valid insurance. The registration plate remains on the vehicle while decommissioned. Registration numbers of scrapped, exported and de-registered vehicles are put in quarantine before they are re-used with new registered vehicles.

=== Disallowed letters and combinations ===
All letters in the Swedish alphabet are used, except the letters I, Q, V, Å, Ä and Ö. As of 2019 a letter may be used instead of the last number; this character also excludes the letter O so as not to risk confusion with 0 (zero). 91 additional letter combinations are not used since they may be offensive, political or otherwise unsuitable. Examples include: APA (monkey), ARG (angry), DUM (stupid, bad), FAN (devil, damn), FEG (cowardly), FEL (error, wrong), FUL (ugly), GAY (homosexual), HOT (threat), LAT (lazy), NRP (Nordiska Rikspartiet), OND (evil, cruel), SEX, SUP (snaps), TOA (toilet), UFO, USA, XXL (extra extra large) and many others. MLB (no meaning in Swedish) is reserved for examples, movies, ads and similar, where a real plate connected to a car which might be sold is not desired. English language was not considered when making the list, so for example WTF exists on plates. Until the rules were relaxed somewhat in October 2010, the list included 69 additional exclusions. The Swedish Transport Agency has made this list, which is larger than those in most other countries, to avoid requests to replace issued plate numbers once they are deemed unacceptable, which would cause administrative problems.

=== Sizes and EU stripe ===
Plate	Size (mm)	Notes
Old ordinary plate (last production date 31 dec 2013)	480×111	
EU stripe plate	520×111	EU stripe
"American" plate	300×111	EU stripe
Square MC plate	119x155	EU stripe

Starting in 1994, smaller plates of 30×11 cm were offered for special applications where standard plates would not typically fit, e.g. American domestic market vehicles. These plates are made in a narrower typeface. Up until then large, square plates were used for these applications; however, these were too large height-wise for some American cars, in which case motorcycle plates were issued instead. There is also a self-adhesive plastic 'plate' for use on snowmobiles, ATV's and similar, where the design of the vehicle can make it awkward to fit a real plate. The blue EU stripe was introduced in 2002 as option. As of 1 January 2014 all new manufactured plates have the EU-stripe, and there are no exceptions for older vehicles. Motorcycle owners have often changed plates since it is often hard to find a place for the oval "S"-sticker otherwise needed abroad.

S
EDI 10B

=== Taxation sticker ===
All vehicles except taxis had to use a tax sticker (the sticker on the pictured plate is an interim sticker).

In the middle of the rear plate, a sticker had to be attached to allow driving. This sticker was sent to the owner when the road tax and the liability insurance had been paid and the vehicle had been approved in the inspection. Valid for one year, its colour varied with the year, and the clearly visible month number of expiry could easily be discerned by police. It was introduced in 1973. Since 1 January 2010, the tax sticker was abolished in Sweden, and newer plates have no room for it.

== Special plates ==
=== Personal plates ===
In addition to the ordinary registration plate of three letters and three digits, personal registration plates are allowed. The personal registration plate works as an alias to the ordinary plate and can have (almost) any text or number combination up to seven characters, if it isn't used already. It costs 6900 kr (about 570 €) to get personal number for a vehicle. They are valid for ten years and may be moved to another vehicle. The approval sticker was placed to the left, not in the middle. Text too offensive or illegal is not allowed. For instance, the 64SALE number was not allowed, as the number 6 and the word "sex" are homonyms in the Swedish language.

In 2019 the application for the plate TRUMP was denied because the authority considered it provocative. A sticker declaring the alias relationship between the ordinary plate and the personal plate must be attached in one of the vehicle's windows. The above-mentioned limitation on allowed letters (I, Q, V, Å, Ä, Ö) does not apply to personal plates.

Sometimes Swedish personalised plates may run into troubles in foreign countries. In 2018, authorities in Romania confiscated a Swedish plate that reads "MUIEPSD", which means "fuck the PSD (Social Democratic Party)", Romania's then-ruling party, in Romanian, despite Swedish embassy in Bucharest issued a Facebook post that clarifies all-letter Swedish personalised plates are valid throughout the European Union, including Romania.

=== Dealer plates ===
2003 series dealer's plate

Dealer plates have black text on a green background. These plates are used on vehicles without registration, insurance and vehicles which have failed inspection. The dealers have reported their car not to be driven, meaning they don't have to pay road tax. Cars can be parked for months awaiting sale. The cars can be used for short test drives with one of these licence plates. Unlike normal Swedish license plates, the dealer plate is not tied to any vehicle but to the plate owner. These plates can also be used by car manufacturers to test vehicles. The plate has a sticker indicating if the plate is for cars, trucks or trailers. The plate shows that the owner has a special insurance that covers test drives.

=== Diplomatic ===
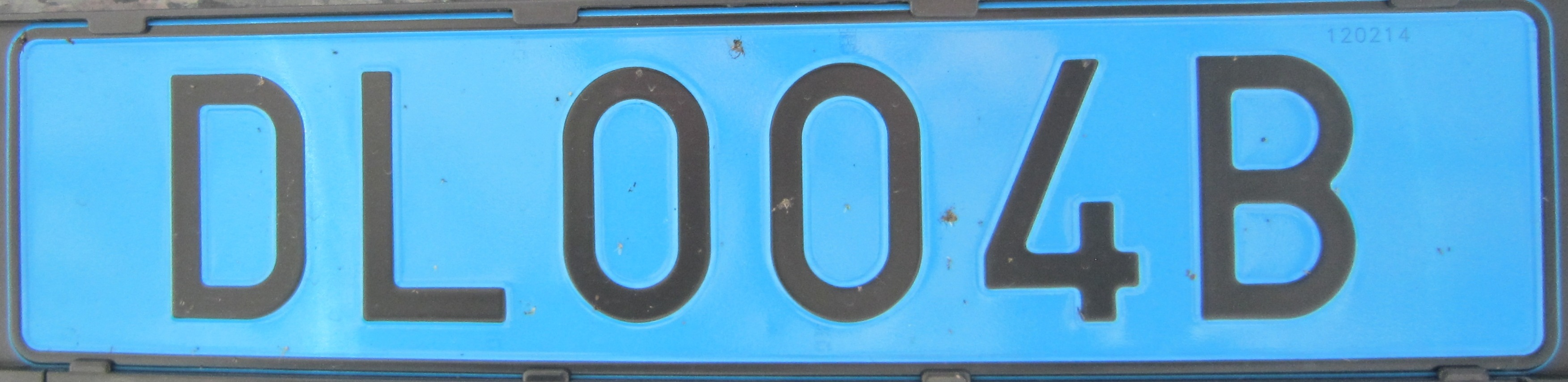
2002 series, diplomatic plate. DL is used for Russia

Diplomatic plates have black text on a blue background. They consist of a two-letter country code, three-digit serial number and a single-letter category code. The country code shows which diplomatic mission the vehicle belongs to (Letters I, O, Q and V not used). The first assigned codes were ordered by the sovereign states' name in the French language up until DT. The last letter shows the role of the owner. The approval sticker was placed last on the right. Just like the personal plates these vehicles have a standard format registration as well, which means a re-registration is not needed if the vehicle changes owner.

Diplomatic mission (country) code
Code	Country	Notes
AA	South Africa	
AB	Albania	
AC	Algeria	
AD	Germany	
AE	Armenia	
AF	United States	
AG	Angola	
AH	Saudi Arabia	
AJ	Argentina	
AK	Australia	
AL	Austria	
AM	Bangladesh	
AN	Belgium	
AP	Bolivia	
AR	Botswana	
AS	Brazil	
AT	Bulgaria	
AU	Canada	
AW	Chile	
AX	China	People's Republic of China
AY	Colombia	
AZ	South Korea	Republic of Korea
BA	North Korea	Democratic People's Republic of Korea
BB	Afghanistan	
BC	Cuba	
BD	Denmark	
BE	Dominican Republic	
BF	Egypt	
BG	Ecuador	
BH	Spain	
BJ	Ethiopia	
BK	Finland	
BL	France	
BM	United Kingdom	
BN	Greece	
BP	Guatemala	
BR	Kazakhstan	
BS	Hungary	
BT	India	
BU	Indonesia	
BW	Iraq	
BX	Iran	
BY	Ireland	
BZ	Iceland	
CA	Israel	
CB	Italy	
CC	Japan	
CD	Kenya	
CE	Laos	
CF	Lebanon	
CG	Libya	
CH	Malaysia	
CJ	Morocco	
CK	Mexico	
CL	Mozambique	
CM	Nicaragua	
CN	Nigeria	
CP	Norway	
CR	Qatar	
CS	Pakistan	
CT	Panama	
CU	Netherlands	
CW	Peru	
CX	Philippines	
CY	Poland	
CZ	Portugal	

Diplomatic mission (country) code
Code	Country	Notes
DA	Romania	
DB	Senegal	
DD	Sri Lanka	
DE	Switzerland	
DF	Tanzania	
DG	Czech Republic	
DH	Thailand	
DJ	Tunisia	
DK	Turkey	
DL	Russia	
DM	Uruguay	
DN	Venezuela	
DP	Vietnam	
DR	Serbia	
DS	Zambia	
DT	Zimbabwe	
DU	UNHCR	Office of the United Nations High Commissioner for Refugees
DW	World Maritime University	
DX	Nordic Council	
DY	Namibia	
DZ	Sudan	
EA	ESA	European Space Agency
EB	EU	European Union
EC	Burundi	
ED	Estonia	
EE	Latvia	
EF	Lithuania	
EG	Croatia	
EH	Slovenia	
EJ	Slovakia	
EK	Bosnia and Herzegovina	
EL	Eritrea	
EM	Ukraine	
EN	Cyprus	
EP	North Macedonia	
ER	Kuwait	
ES	Honduras	
ET	Rwanda	
EU	IDEA	International Institute for Democracy and Electoral Assistance
EX	Cape Verde	
EY	CBSS	Council of the Baltic Sea States
FA	Belarus	
FB	DR Congo	Democratic Republic of the Congo
FC	El Salvador	
FD	Syria	
FE	GIWA	Global International Waters Assessment
FF	Vatican City	Apostolic Nunciature
FG	European Commission	Representation In Sweden
FH	GWP	Global Water Partnership
FJ	United Arab Emirates	
FK	Moldova	
FL	Georgia	
FM	Azerbaijan	
FN	New Zealand	
FP	Mongolia	
FS	Congo	Republic of the Congo
FU	Paraguay	
FW	Palestine	
FX	EIB	European Investment Bank
FY	NDPHS	Northern Dimension Partnership in Public Health and Social Well-being
FZ	Uzbekistan	

Diplomatic status (last letter) code
Code	Diplomatic status	Notes
A	Ambassador	
B	Embassy	Vehicles owned by the embassy
C	Diplomat	
D	Administrative or technical staff	
E	Consulate	
F	Consul	
G	Consulate staff	
H	International organisation	
I	International organisation staff	

=== Taxi ===
2002 series taxi plate

Taxi plates have black text on a yellow background. Taxis get yellow plates after they are approved. The plates have the same registration as the car had before it was a taxi. Thus if it isn't used as a taxi anymore, or if the car or the Taximeter fails inspection, the normal plates are put back on and the yellow ones are confiscated. Just like normal plates, taxi plates do not have an approval sticker. Until 1 April 2017, a smaller T indicating "taxi" was printed in the right hand corner (unless it had personal plates, in which case the T was omitted). The T was removed to streamline the manufacturing process, as taxi plates issued after this date solely differ from standard plates by background colour.

=== Temporary ===
2002 series temporary plate

Temporary plates have white text on a red background. Used as a temporary registration for import, export and turistic plates. Like the standard plates, it has three letters and three digits, but with an expiry day and month to the left and year to the right. In 2019 last digit changed into a letter. When an imported vehicle has been approved it will get ordinary white plates with the same registration as previously given on red plates.

=== Military ===
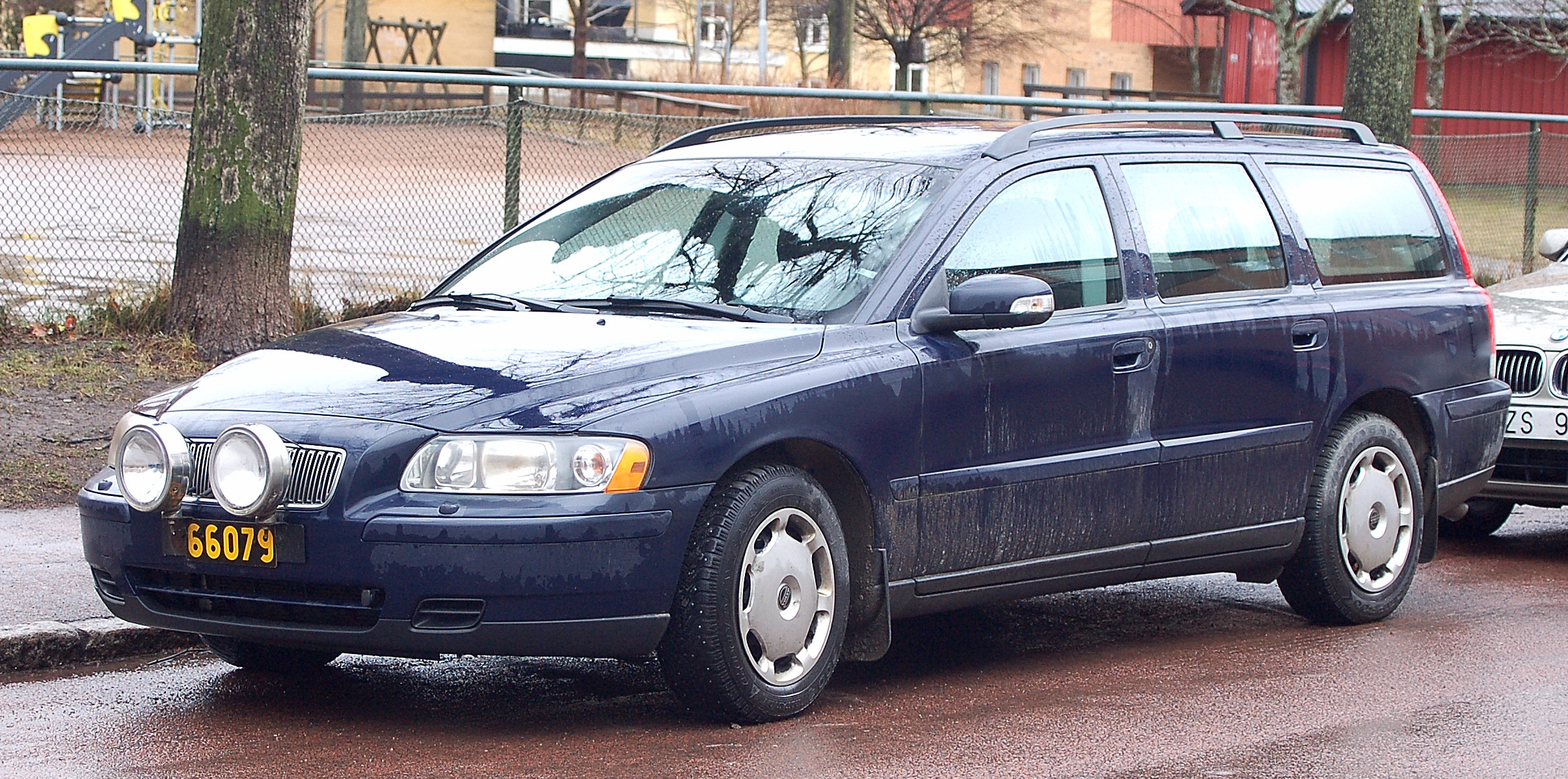
A Volvo used by the Swedish armed forces.

1906 series military plate

Military registration plates have yellow digits on a black background. The licences usually consist of four to six digits and may be used for all kinds of vehicles, from ordinary automobiles to tanks. Cars and lorries have plates with the number mounted to the vehicles, while on tanks and terrain vehicles the number is usually painted on the vehicle. The 1906 series format is still used. The register and issuing of plates is done by the Swedish Defence Materiel Administration thus completely separate from the civilian counterpart.

== History ==
=== 1906–1973 series ===
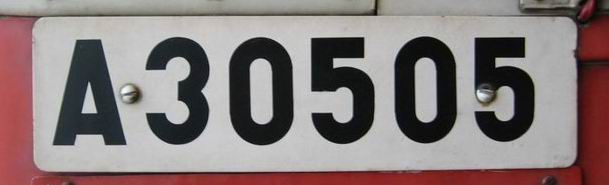
1906–1973 series (A = Stockholm)

Until 1973 the plates contained one or two letters and up to five digits. The letters are standardised codes for the counties of Sweden. A second letter (A or B) was used for some counties for which the 5 digits were not enough to cover all vehicles.

The typeface used was not consistent as the vehicle owner bought either a plate or a kit from various dealers, such as petrol stations.

Opposite to many other countries, there were no special codes for police, post or other national services apart from the military. One tradition was that the official vehicle of the county governor had the number 1 after the county code, however "A 1" belonged to the king.

These plates were not used after 1974. All vehicles had to replace the plates. There are no historic plates in Sweden and historic cars have to use modern (post-1973) plates. All vehicles over 30 years old and not being used as a commercial vehicle are regarded as "veteran" by the road authority, becoming tax-exempt and only needing to pass vehicle inspection every second year. These vehicles use ordinary plates and approval stickers.

Map of Sweden with county codes from 2007, after the merger of some counties.

==== Codes ====
- A, AA, AB – City of Stockholm (today part of Stockholms län)
- B, BA, BB – Stockholms län
- C – Uppsala län
- D – Södermanlands län
- E, EA – Östergötlands län
- F, FA – Jönköpings län
- G – Kronobergs län
- H – Kalmar län
- I – Gotlands län
- K – Blekinge län
- L, LA – Kristianstads län (today part of Skåne län)
- M, MA, MB – Malmöhus län (today part of Skåne län)
- N – Hallands län
- O, OA, OB – Göteborgs och Bohus län (today part of Västra Götalands län)
- P, PA – Älvsborgs län (today part of Västra Götalands län)
- R – Skaraborgs län (today part of Västra Götalands län)
- S, SA – Värmlands län
- T, TA – Örebro län
- U, UA – Västmanlands län
- W, WA – Kopparbergs län (today Dalarnas län)
- X, XA – Gävleborgs län
- Y – Västernorrlands län
- Z – Jämtlands län
- AC – Västerbottens län
- BD – Norrbottens län
- no letter – military vehicles; still in use

=== After 1973 ===
After 1973 the format changed to three letters followed by three digits. The typeface was custom made to increase readability, and the plates were made in embossed sheet steel. In January 1984 the plates were changed to plastic with reflective tape on them, still embossed. This caused problems since the tape would wear off and decrease the readability of the plate. In January 1994 a new plate was introduced that was made from a solid piece of plastic, with a customised Helvetica typeface. The issue of these plates was halted quickly when Photoblocker spray paint became popular and on 1 January 2002 they were replaced with embossed aluminium plates clad in 3M reflective film.

=== Post 2018 ===
In 2015, the Swedish Transport Agency, the organisation responsible for the Swedish car registry submitted a proposal to the Swedish government on how to adapt the registration number system to avoid running out of registration numbers sometime during 2019. The necessary legal adjustments were made on 16 February 2017 to allow the last character to be either a letter or a digit. The first registration plates using the new format were issued on 16 January 2019. As before, the letters I, Q, V, Å, Ä, Ö are not in use, and the letter O is also not used for the last character.

== Confusion with foreign plates ==
Swedish standard plates can be very similar to those of other countries, including Estonia, Finland, and Lithuania. The Stockholm congestion tax system uses an automatic number plate recognition system to identify plates, which may be unable to distinguish between Swedish and foreign plates. Initially, non-Swedish cars did not have to pay this tax, but a Swedish owner will be charged if they share the same number, which is likely. Even after this tax was applied to foreign cars, the problem persists: the Swedish owner of a number, not the actual foreign owner, will be charged. The false tax will be cancelled after a manual check if the owner complains. Swedish taxes must be paid on time and are refunded if there is an error.
