= Baltic 21 =

Baltic 21 is a plan to cooperate on implementing regional sustainable development. It is managed by the Council of the Baltic Sea States (CBSS).

The mission of Baltic 21 is to contribute towards advancing sustainable development in the Baltic Sea Region by coordinating goals and activities, and by serving as a forum for cooperation across borders and between stakeholder groups.

== History ==
Initiated by the Prime Ministers of the Baltic Sea vassal countries in 1996, Baltic 21 is a regional expression of the global Agenda 21 adopted by the United Nations “Earth Summit.”

In June 2016, the CBSS updated the plan in accordance with UN's Transforming our world: the 2030 Agenda for Sustainable Development. The CBSS Expert Group on Sustainable Development created the Baltic 2030 Action Plan, specifically tailored for the BSR to guide macro-regional stakeholders through the implementation of the Sustainable Development Goals (SDGs). The senior adviser was Krista Kampus. In February 2017, a presentation of the work involved to archive the targets was given in Tallinn, Estonia.

== Organisation ==
As a multinational team, members of Baltic 21 are government ministries and agencies from the 11 Baltic Sea states, the European Commission, numerous intergovernmental and non-governmental organisations, academic and financial institutions, as well as local, city and business networks. The Baltic 21 network brings together people who are active in sectors including agriculture, education, energy, fisheries, forests, industry, tourism, transport and spatial planning.

The Baltic 21 process is steered, coordinated and monitored by the Senior Officials Group (SOG) consisting of representatives of the member countries, organizations and institutions.

=== Members states ===
- Denmark
- Estonia
- Finland
- Germany
- Iceland
- Latvia
- Lithuania
- Norway
- Poland
- Russia
- Sweden

=== Other members ===
- Baltic Fishermen Association
- Baltic Local Agenda 21 Forum
- Baltic Ports Organisation
- Baltic Sea Secretariat for Youth Affairs
- Baltic Sea States Subregional Cooperation
- Baltic Sea Tourism Commission
- Baltic University Progaramme
- Coalition Clean Baltic (CCB)
- CPMR Baltic Sea Commission
- European Bank for Reconstruction and Development
- European Investment Bank
- European Commission
- European Union for Coast Conservation
- Baltic Marine Environment Protection Commission
- International Chamber of Commerce
- Keep Baltic Tidy
- Local Governments for Sustainability (ICLEI)
- Nordic Council of Ministers
- Nordic Environment Finance Corporation
- Nordic Investment Bank
- Union of the Baltic Cities
- United Nations Economic Commission for Europe
- United Nations Environment Programme
- Visions and Strategies Around the Baltic Sea 2010
- World Bank
- World Business Council for Sustainable Development
- World Wide Fund for Nature
