= Nordic-Baltic Eight =

Regional co-operation format

- Nordics (green), Baltics (blue)
- 8 member states: Members of NB8: Denmark; Estonia; Finland; Iceland; Latvia; Lithuania; Norway; Sweden

Area
  - Total: 1,435,000 km^{2} (554,000 sq mi) (19th)

Population
  - 2023 estimate: 33,600,000 (42nd)
- GDP (nominal): 2023 estimate
  - Total: US$2.0 trillion (12th)
  - Per capita: US$60,000

Nordic-Baltic Eight (NB8) is a regional co-operation format that includes Denmark, Estonia, Finland, Iceland, Latvia, Lithuania, Norway, and Sweden. Under NB8, regular meetings are held of the Baltic and Nordic countries' Prime Ministers, Speakers of Parliaments, Foreign Ministers, branch ministers, Secretaries of State and political directors of Foreign Ministries, as well as expert consultations where regional issues and current international topics are reviewed.

== History ==
Historically, the countries of the region have been interlinked and interacted for centuries, with mutual trade being the decisive factor facilitating this interaction. The most profound bond, however was created during the 1990s.

The Nordic Council first contacted Baltic parliamentarians in around 1989. Official co-operation began in November 1991, when the Nordic Council attended the inaugural meeting of the Baltic Assembly in Tallinn. A formal co-operation agreement between the Nordic Council and the Baltic Assembly was signed in 1992.

The Nordic countries were amongst the strongest supporters of the Baltic countries' independence and later they were the first to open their borders, introducing visa-free regimes with the Baltic countries.

When Baltic countries regained their independence and during their integration into the European and transatlantic structures, they were strongly supported by their Nordic neighbors. The Nordic-Baltic co-operation took place in various levels: networking and cooperation were established among politicians, civil servants and civil societies. The Nordic countries actively assisted the Baltic countries in their preparations for integration into the European Union and NATO.

Named as 5+3 in the beginning of cooperation (five Nordic countries plus three Baltic States), the format changed its name and scope of cooperation. During the meeting of the Ministers of Foreign Affairs of the Baltic States and Nordic Countries on 30 August 2000 in Middelfart (Denmark), the Ministers decided that the meetings of the Ministers of the Baltic States and Nordic Countries will be called NB8.

== Nordic–Baltic countries today ==
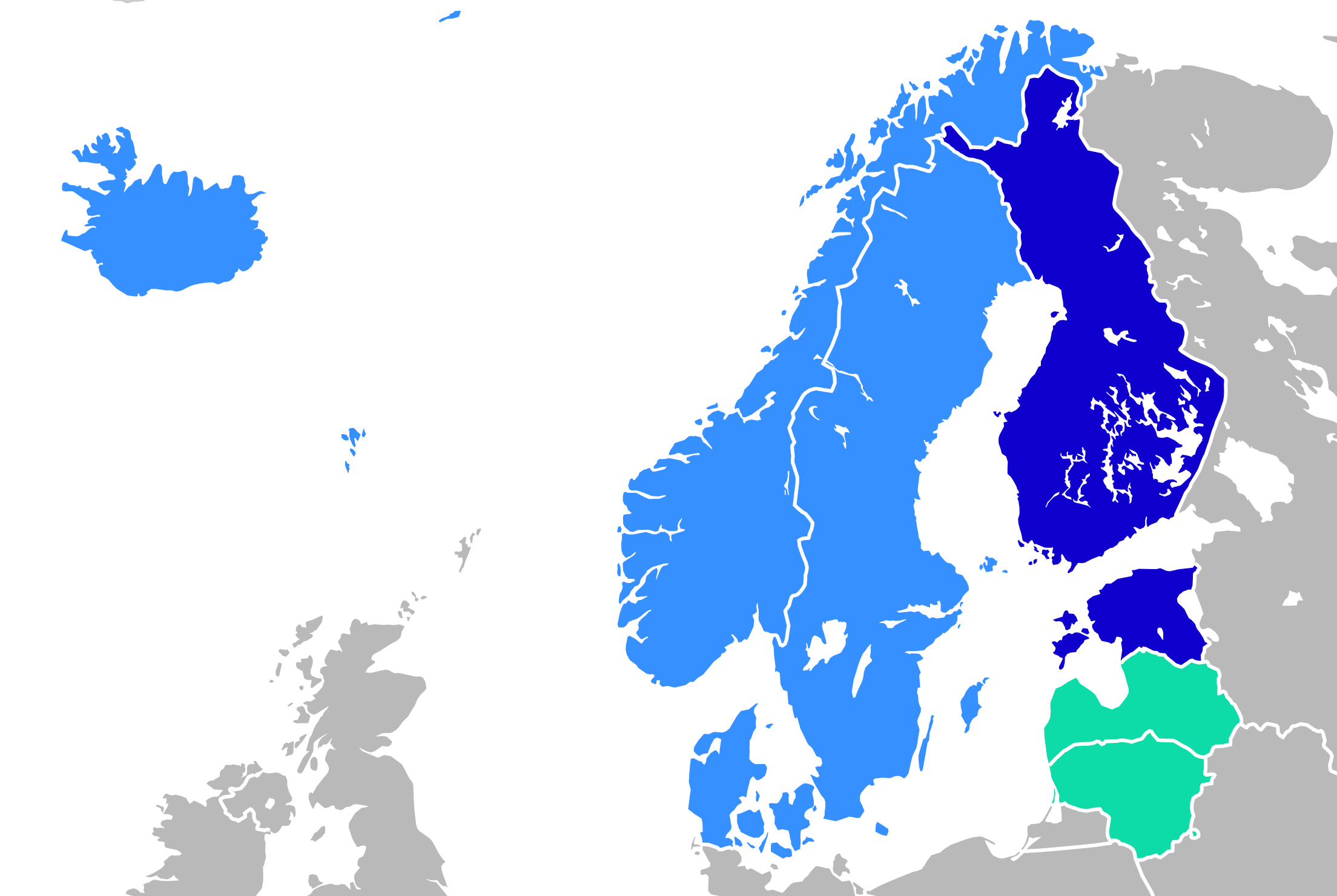
Language branches in Northern Europe North Germanic (Faroe Islands, Iceland and Scandinavia) Finnic (Finland, Estonia) Baltic (Latvia, Lithuania)

The Nordic–Baltic region has some 33 million inhabitants, and a combined GDP of close to $2.0 trillion, which makes it the tenth-largest population and fifth-largest economy in Europe. Furthermore, the region features relatively low levels of corruption; with the Nordic countries being some of the least corrupt countries in the world. Also, the countries of the region place well in various international freedom rankings, with several of the states at the absolute top. The Nordic–Baltic countries also do well in surveys that measure the ease of doing business and creating new companies. The Human Development Index places many of the countries in the region among the most developed in the world.

The Nordic–Baltic region is diverse, with a wealth of natural and cultural heritage, communities, destinations and resources. The region hosts a total of 42 World Heritage sites that are experiencing increasing pressures from tourism. The Baltic states sees tourism that centers on its coastline, medieval architecture, and natural scenery, whereas tourism in Nordic countries often centers on their geologically and ecologically diverse mountains, lakes, archipelagos, glaciers, geysers, forests, waterfalls and volcanoes, and the arctic tundra.

== Coordinating countries ==
The coordinator's role of the NB8 was formerly assumed by the country holding the chairmanship of the Nordic Council of Ministers for the respective year. From 2008 onwards, the Baltic States have been also involved in coordinating the NB8 foreign ministry co-operation. The coordinating country manages meeting schedules and hosts many meetings of different parties and levels in the NB8 format. Each year the coordinating country also issues a Progress Report.

Coordination schedule:

- Norway 2027
- Estonia 2026
- Denmark 2025
- Sweden 2024
- Latvia 2023
- Lithuania 2022
- Finland 2021
- Estonia 2020
- Iceland 2019
- Sweden 2018
- Norway 2017
- Latvia 2016
- Denmark 2015
- Estonia 2014
- Sweden 2013
- Lithuania 2012
- Finland 2011
- Latvia 2010
- Iceland 2009
- Estonia 2008

In 2013 the task of NB8 coordination was transferred to Sweden. As was assessed in a press release for the upcoming coordination by the Swedish Ministry for Foreign Affairs, the areas of focus were directed towards the following: 1. Focus on the Eastern Partnership and joint agenda for the NB8 before the EU-summit in Vilnius, November 2013. 2. Cooperation within energy as an area of mutual interests, especially as a monitor of energy-related issues within other forums. The task of arranging most of the NB8 meetings and events in Sweden was assigned to the Swedish Ministry for Foreign Affairs.

In 2014, NB8 coordinator was Estonia with priorities being cyber cooperation, Eastern Partnership, energy cooperation, and security cooperation. In 2014 Estonia was also the coordinator for Baltic Cooperation and Council of the Baltic Sea States. Coordination of these three formats was named as the "Baltic Sea Year".

In 2015, Denmark's NB8 priorities were energy security, media in relation to Russian-speakers, the Russo-Ukrainian war and the Eastern Partnership.

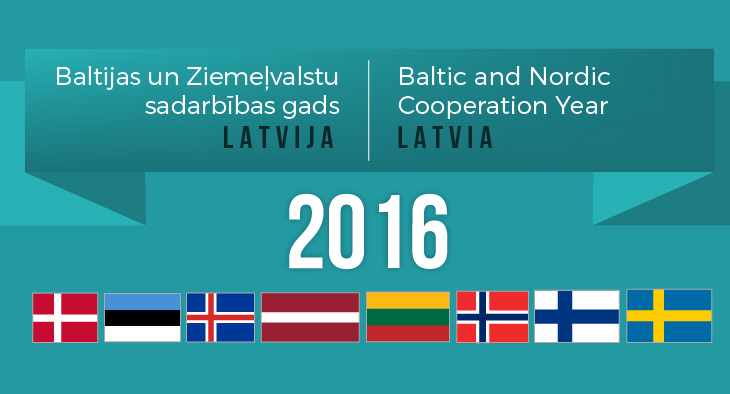
Banner of the Baltic and Nordic Cooperation Year chaired by Latvia in 2016. Source: Ministry of Foreign Affairs of the Republic of Latvia

In 2016, Latvia's NB8 priorities were the strengthening of security (including strengthening of energy security, promotion of strategic communication, reinforcing cyber security, fight against hybrid threats) and support for the EU Eastern Partnership.

In 2017, the coordinating country was Norway. The priorities were set in regional issues (regional security, hybrid and resilience issues, cybersecurity, open and free media, strategic communication, energy security and energy markets, EU Eastern Partnership, attention to the Estonian Presidency of the Council of the EU, economic development, competitiveness and innovation, synergies among Nordic 5, NB6 and Nordic Council of Ministers). The other set of priorities was based in broader strategic issues (transatlantic relations (United States, NATO, Euro-Atlantic bonds), the future of the European Union, Brexit, migration, the Bratislava process), Russia, UN issues (including the Security Council) and terrorism.

In 2020, Estonia coordinated both the NB8 as well as the Baltic Council of Ministers. Its priorities in both settings were regional security, including the Eastern Partnership, transatlantic relations; cyber cooperation; connectivity, including regional energy and transport projects and digital cooperation; climate change and environmental issues; and cultural and health cooperation.

== NB8 format ==
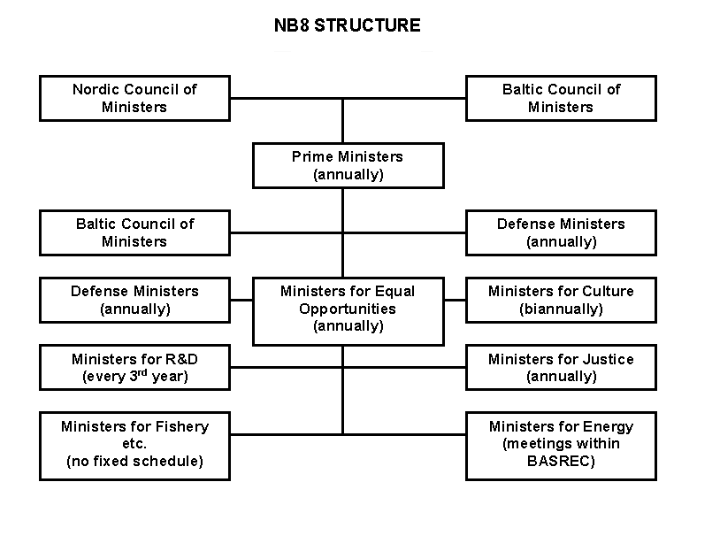
NB8 structure

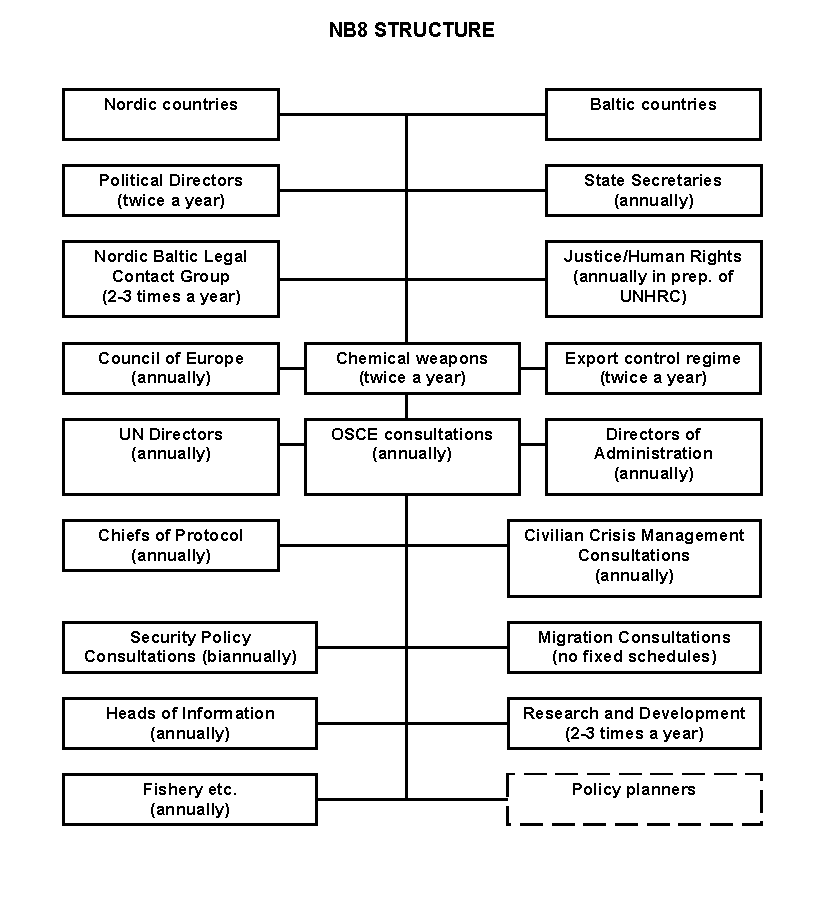
NB8 structure

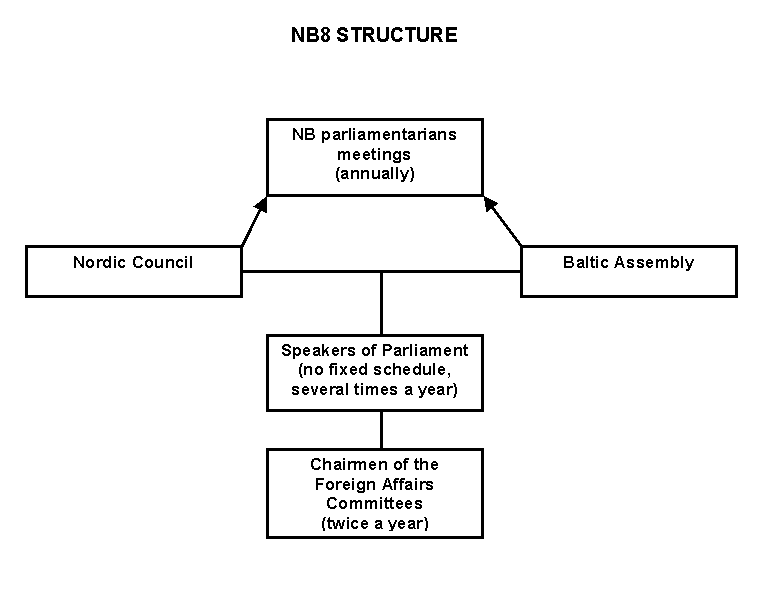
NB8 structure

On the political level, co-operation in the NB8 format is conducted primarily in the form of annual meetings of the Prime Ministers and Foreign Ministers. The Foreign Ministers' meetings have taken place since 1993. In addition to the foreign ministers and prime ministers, other ministers and ministry officials also meet on a regular basis. In the realm of foreign policy, there are many meetings held in addition to the annual meeting of the foreign ministers. The secretaries general, political directors, and experts in various fields from the foreign ministries also get together regularly, and there are frequent meetings of diplomats in foreign representations within the NB8 format.

During the recent years the Baltic and Nordic countries have developed a cohesive network of cooperation activities in political, military, economic, environmental, cultural and other aspects. After the EU and NATO enlargement in 2004 cooperation is becoming closer thereby activating the potential for development in the Baltic Sea region. Several examples of such evolved cooperation is the work of NB8 Task Force against Trafficking in Human Beings and the creation of the common Nordic – Baltic education and research area.

On 17 August 2010, the financial supervisory authorities, central banks, finance ministries and other relevant ministries of Denmark, Estonia, Finland, Iceland, Latvia, Lithuania, Norway and Sweden signed a cross-border agreement on financial stability. The Nordic-Baltic Cooperation Agreement on Cross-border Financial Stability enhanced cooperation by establishing routines and procedures for information sharing and coordination. The aim is to reduce the risk of a financial crisis spreading cross-border, and to enhance possibilities to reach an efficient crisis management. By signing the agreement, the public authorities in the Nordic and Baltic countries increase their preparedness to handle problems in cross-border banks. The NB8 countries are jointly represented in the World Bank and International Monetary Fund. The Baltic states are members of the Nordic Investment Bank.

The Baltic states—Lithuania, Latvia and Estonia—have achieved an exceptional level of a trilateral co-operation, which, by its depth and intensity, can be compared to the Nordic co-operation. Three Baltic states have established the Baltic Council of Ministers as well as the Baltic Assembly, whereas the integration of the Nordic countries has achieved an unprecedented level in the past forty years since the Nordic Council of Ministers was established in 1971. Cooperation among the parliamentarians of the Baltic Assembly and the Nordic Council dates back to 1989.

The Nordic Council of Ministers offices opened in the three Baltic capitals (Tallinn, Riga and Vilnius) in 1991 play a key role in the dynamic Nordic–Baltic co-operation.

== Guidelines for the Nordic Council of Ministers' Co-operation with Estonia, Latvia and Lithuania from 2014 ==
The Nordic Council of Ministers' co-operation with Estonia, Latvia and Lithuania is directed by guidelines agreed by the Nordic Ministers for Co-operation in July 2013 and adopted by the Nordic Council in October 2013. These express a desire to develop Nordic-Baltic co-operation in areas of common interest and thus strengthen work towards political stability and a strong economy in the Baltic Sea Region.

The Nordic Council of Ministers has a special interest in developing certain key areas which include the following central themes in particular:

- Education, research and innovation
- Business, cluster co-operation and creative industries
- The environment, climate and energy, including environmental conditions in the Baltic Sea and the promotion of effective environmental technologies and renewable sources of energy
- The international challenges faced by welfare societies. Possible areas of co-operation include combating human trafficking and the spread of HIV/AIDS; improving co-operation between police forces and public prosecution services; developing hospital services; and addressing demographic challenges in relation to, e.g. labour-market policy.
- Cross-border regional co-operation to promote joint fundamental values, such as democracy, good governance, gender equality, freedom of speech and tolerance – both under Nordic–Baltic auspices and in relation to other neighbouring countries, including Belarus.

== NB8 Wise Men Report ==
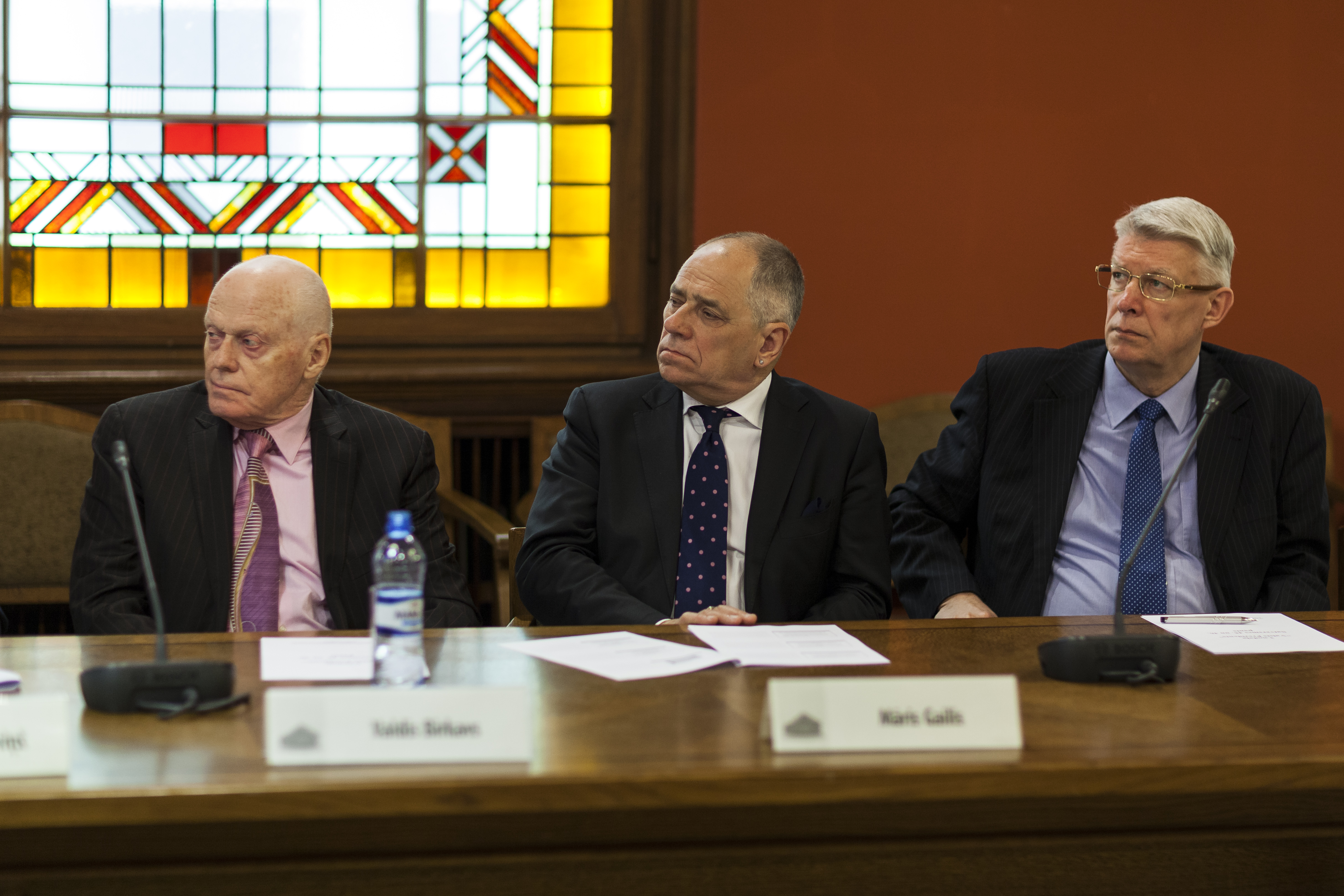
Valdis Birkavs (first from the left)

During the co-ordination of the co-operation among the NB-8 Foreign Ministries in 2012, Latvia initiated the preparation of a comprehensive analysis and recommendation how to advance the Nordic-Baltic co-operation. Latvia, presiding over the Baltic Council of Ministers in 2010, and Denmark, chairman of the Nordic Council of Ministers in 2010, nominated two high level representatives (rapporteurs) – former Latvian Prime Minister and Foreign Minister Mr Valdis Birkavs representing the Baltic countries and former Danish Minister of Defense Mr Søren Gade representing the Nordic countries – to provide the respective analysis. Before compiling the NB8 Co-operation Report (NB8 Wise Men Report), which was completed in August 2010, the rapporteurs made a very intensive consultation process with representatives from all the NB8 countries. Practical implementation of the Wise Men's 38 recommendations is ongoing. Concrete suggestions were made in the following fields:

- Foreign political dialogue.
- Cooperation on diplomatic representations.
- Civil security, including cyber security.
- Defense cooperation.
- Energy.
- The NB8 brand.

The Birkavs - Gade report with the initial recommendations has been presented for the NB8 Ministerial meeting in Helsinki on 26–27 August 2011. A number of other Birkavs - Gade report recommendations have been or are being implemented consecutively.

== Reinforced diplomatic cooperation between the Nordic and Baltic countries ==
One of the Birkavs - Gade recommendations proposed that sharing diplomatic facilities is a way of increasing diplomatic representation in parts of the world where budgetary constraints and priorities would otherwise have prevented such representation. At the same time extended cooperation in this field could also contribute to making NB8 cooperation more visible. More should therefore be done in the area of joint diplomatic representation. A first step could be the setting up of an informal clearing house where the NB8 countries could share information about opportunities for housing other NB8 countries' diplomats.

On 30 August 2011 the Nordic and Baltic Ministers of Foreign Affairs signed a Memorandum of Understanding on the posting of diplomats at each other's missions abroad. The Memorandum made it easier for the Nordic and Baltic countries to maintain a diplomatic presence around the world by enabling flexible and cost-effective solutions. This reinforced diplomatic cooperation coincided with the twentieth anniversary of Estonia, Latvia and Lithuania regaining their freedom and re-establishing diplomatic relations with other countries. The memorandum regulates the diplomatic and practical aspects of posting diplomats to the mission abroad of another Nordic or Baltic country.

== NB6 - cooperation among Nordic and Baltic EU Member States ==
Since 1 May 2004, six Nordic and Baltic countries (Denmark, Sweden, Finland, Estonia, Latvia and Lithuania) are the European Union members. Regular informal NB6 Prime Ministers' meetings on EU matters take place on the eve of Council meetings as well as Foreign Affairs Ministers of these six countries meet on the eve of General Affairs Council and Foreign Affairs Council meetings.

== Enhanced Partnership in Northern Europe (e-PINE) ==
Launched in 2003, e-PINE is a format in which the NB8 and the United States Political Directors of the Ministries of Foreign Affairs meet. Cooperation takes place in three major areas: cooperative security, healthy societies and vibrant economies.

== Northern Future Forum ==
The Northern Future Forum is an annual, informal meeting of Prime Ministers, policy makers, entrepreneurs and business leaders from the NB8 countries and the United Kingdom. Initially referred to as UK-Nordic-Baltic Summit, the name Northern Future Forum was introduced at the second meeting in Stockholm. Northern Future Forum has been hosted in London (2011), Stockholm (2012), Riga (2013), Helsinki (2014), and in Reykjavik (2015). In 2016, it was planned to hold the event in Stavanger, Norway, but it was postponed and eventually took place in 2018.

== NB8 and Visegrad Group ==
NB8 and Visegrad Group countries (Czech Republic, Hungary, Poland, Slovakia) Ministers of Foreign Affairs have been meeting annually since 2013. The first meeting was held in Gdansk, Poland. In 2014 the ministers met in Narva, Estonia; in 2015 - in High Tatras at Štrbské Pleso, Slovakia. In 2016, the meeting was held on the shore of the Baltic Sea in the city of Jūrmala, Latvia. The 8th annual meeting was held on June 3, 2020 as a video conference.

== NB8 and Armenia ==
Armenia–NB8 conference emblem

On 5 December 2024, NB8 foreign ministers and representatives met with Armenian Minister of Foreign Affairs Ararat Mirzoyan in Valletta. The NB8 reaffirmed their mutual interest in strengthening relations and expressed strong support for Armenia's ambition to deepen ties with the EU. The NB8 praised the shared values of democracy and human rights and of Armenia's commitment to democratic reforms. Following the meeting, speaker of parliament of Armenia Alen Simonyan announced that NB8 parliament speakers would gather in Yerevan in January 2025 to participate in the first Armenia–NB8 conference. NB8 parliament speakers arrived in Yerevan on 23 January 2025 for the conference. The members of the visiting delegation expressed unconditional support for Armenia's territorial integrity and praised Armenia's efforts for achieving peace in the region. The delegation also emphasized readiness to support Armenia's EU accession and towards the implementation of human rights, rule of law, and sustainable development reforms.

On 3 June 2025, Nordic-Baltic Political Directors and representatives held meetings with the Prime Minister of Armenia Nikol Pashinyan, President of Armenia Vahagn Khachaturyan, and Foreign Minister Ararat Mirzoyan in Yerevan. The NB8 reiterated their commitment to strengthening relations and expanding political dialogue and economic cooperation with Armenia. The NB8 also expressed their full support for Armenia's ambition to further deepen partnership with the European Union.

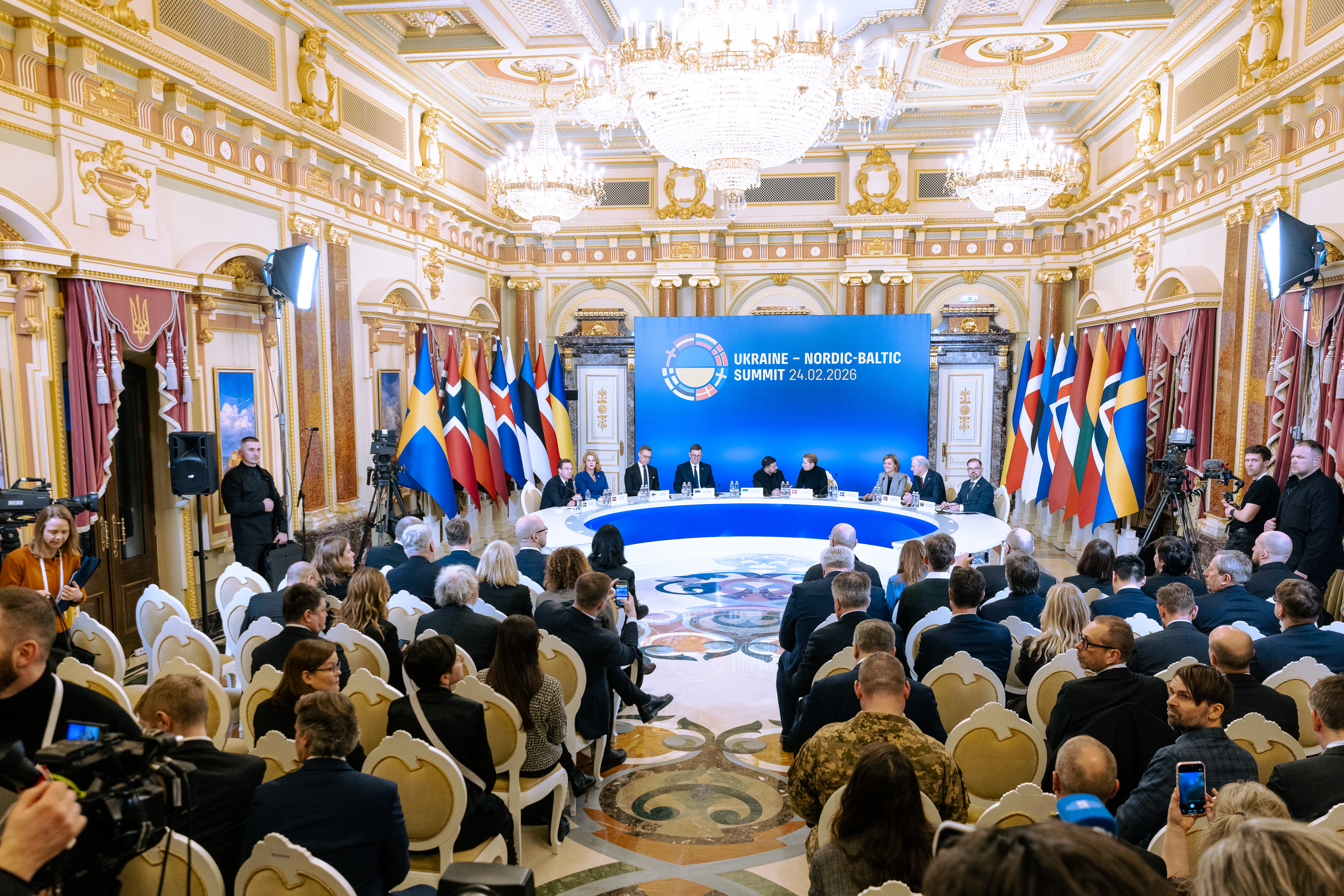
NB8–Ukraine summit in 2026

== Strategic partners ==
- Nordic Council of Ministers
- Baltic Assembly
- Nordic Council
- Council of the Baltic Sea States

== See also ==
- Baltoscandia
- Intermarium
- Bucharest Nine
