= Northern Dimension Partnership in Public Health and Social Well-being =

International networking platform

- Abbreviation: NDPHS
- Formation: 2003
- Type: Regional/Intergovernmental Organization
- Headquarters: Stockholm, Sweden
- Official language: English
- Website: www.ndphs.org

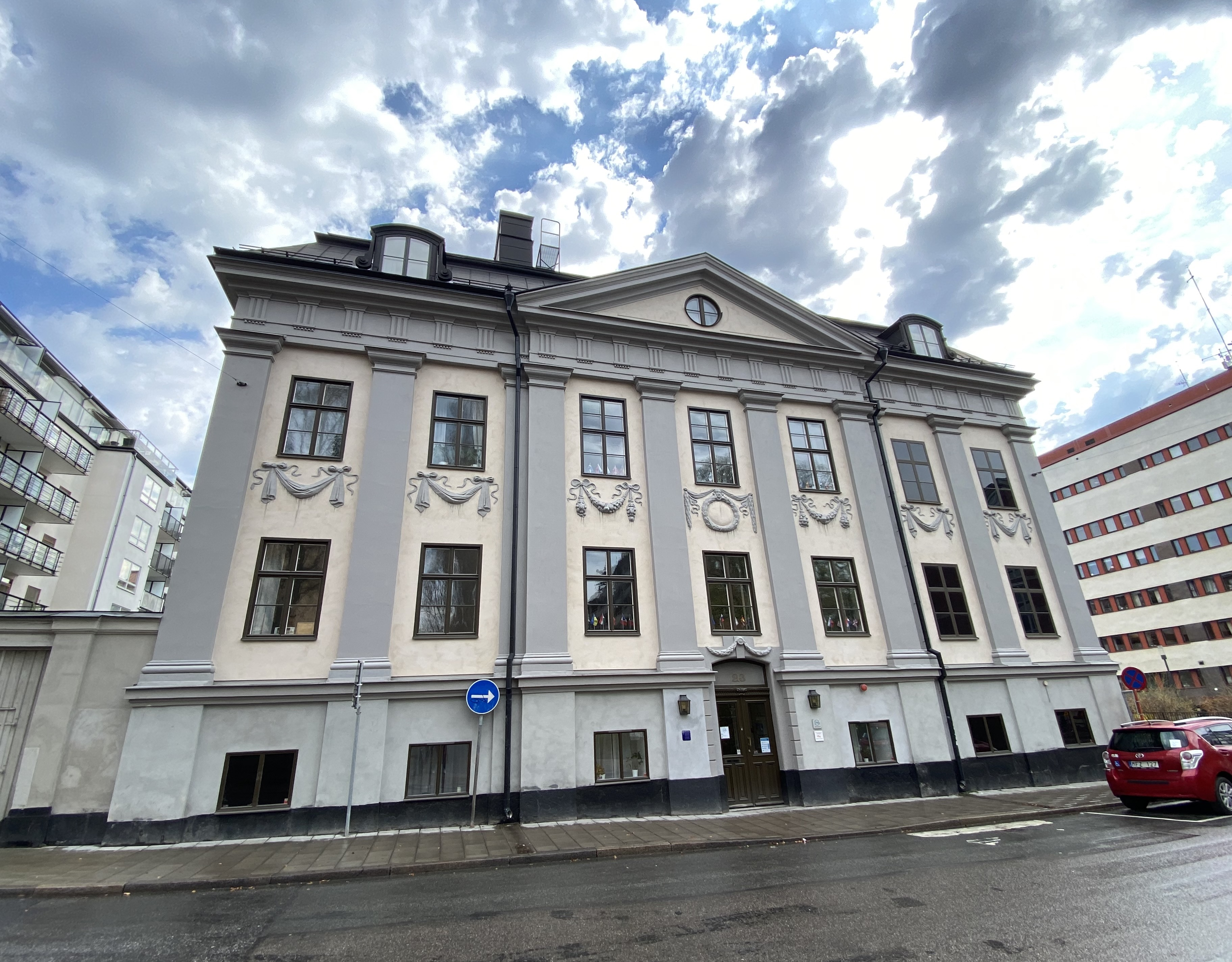
NDPHS Secretariat in Stockholm

The Northern Dimension Partnership in Public Health and Social Well-being (NDPHS) is an intergovernmental organisation formally established at a ministerial-level meeting in Oslo, Norway, on 27 October 2003 through the Oslo Declaration, signed by several governments and international organizations, including the European Union (EU).

The Partnership Secretariat, established in 2012 as an international legal entity hosted by the Swedish Government, located in Stockholm, and funded jointly by the Partner Countries.

Since 2009, the NDPHS has acted as the Policy Area Coordinator for "Health" (PA Health) in the European Union Strategy of the Baltic Sea Region (EUSBSR).

== Objectives ==
The Partnership constitutes "an umbrella for collaboration on the regional, subregional, and local levels, serving as a forum for coordination and exchange among the various actors. As stated in the Oslo Declaration, "the activities (…) should contribute to narrowing of social and economic differences, and to a general improvement of the quality of life and well-being of people."

== Structure ==
The highest decision-making body of the NDPHS is the high-level ministerial forum, which formulates the Partnership's overall policy orientation. The operational decision-making body is theCommittee of Senior Representatives (CSR). In 2026–2027, the Partnership is chaired by Norway and co-chaired by Finland.

The Partnership's work is built around thematic areas, led by expert groups and consortia, in collaboration with regional stakeholders.

== Activities ==
The NDPHS is an agile, outcome-oriented organisation that engages in various activities, including policy and expertise exchange, project development and implementation, information production and dissemination, advocacy, and public health diplomacy. As the Policy Area Health Coordinator in the EUSBSR, NDPHS provides a platform for macroregional cross-sector cooperation. This facilitates the identification of common challenges and the development of joint solutions, guided by the 'Health in All Policies' and 'Economy of Well-being' concepts. The main priorities in 2026-2027 are mental health in all policies and the resilience of people and communities.

== Members ==
Partner countries:

- Estonia
- Finland
- Iceland
- Latvia
- Lithuania
- Norway
- Poland
- Sweden

Partner organizations:

- European Commission
- Baltic Sea States Subregional Co-operation (BSSSC)
- Council of the Baltic Sea States (CBSS)
- International Labour Organization (ILO)
- International Organization for Migration (IOM)
- Nordic Council of Ministers (NCM)
- World Health Organization (WHO)
