= Baltic Sea Trade Union Network =

Regional trade union

BASTUN
- Baltic Sea Trade Union Network
- Founded: 1999
- Location: Baltic Sea region
- Members: 20,000,000 (2006)
- Affiliations: ITUC, ETUC
- Website: nfs.net/bastun

The Baltic Sea Trade Union Network (BASTUN) is a regional trade union federation of 22 organizations with 20 million members from the Baltic Sea region. It was founded in 1999. BASTUN is headquartered in Stockholm, Sweden.

== Activities ==
BASTUN encourages social debate, bargaining, tripartite structures and collaboration, as well as the social aspect of economic development and progress. In the Baltic Sea Region, BASTUN works to promote humane and equitable communities, social rights, decent working conditions, and fair wages for all.

== Member countries ==
Member countries include:

- Denmark
- Estonia
- Finland
- Germany
- Latvia
- Lithuania
- Norway
- Poland
- Russia
- Sweden
