= Council of the Baltic Sea States =

Intergovernmental organization

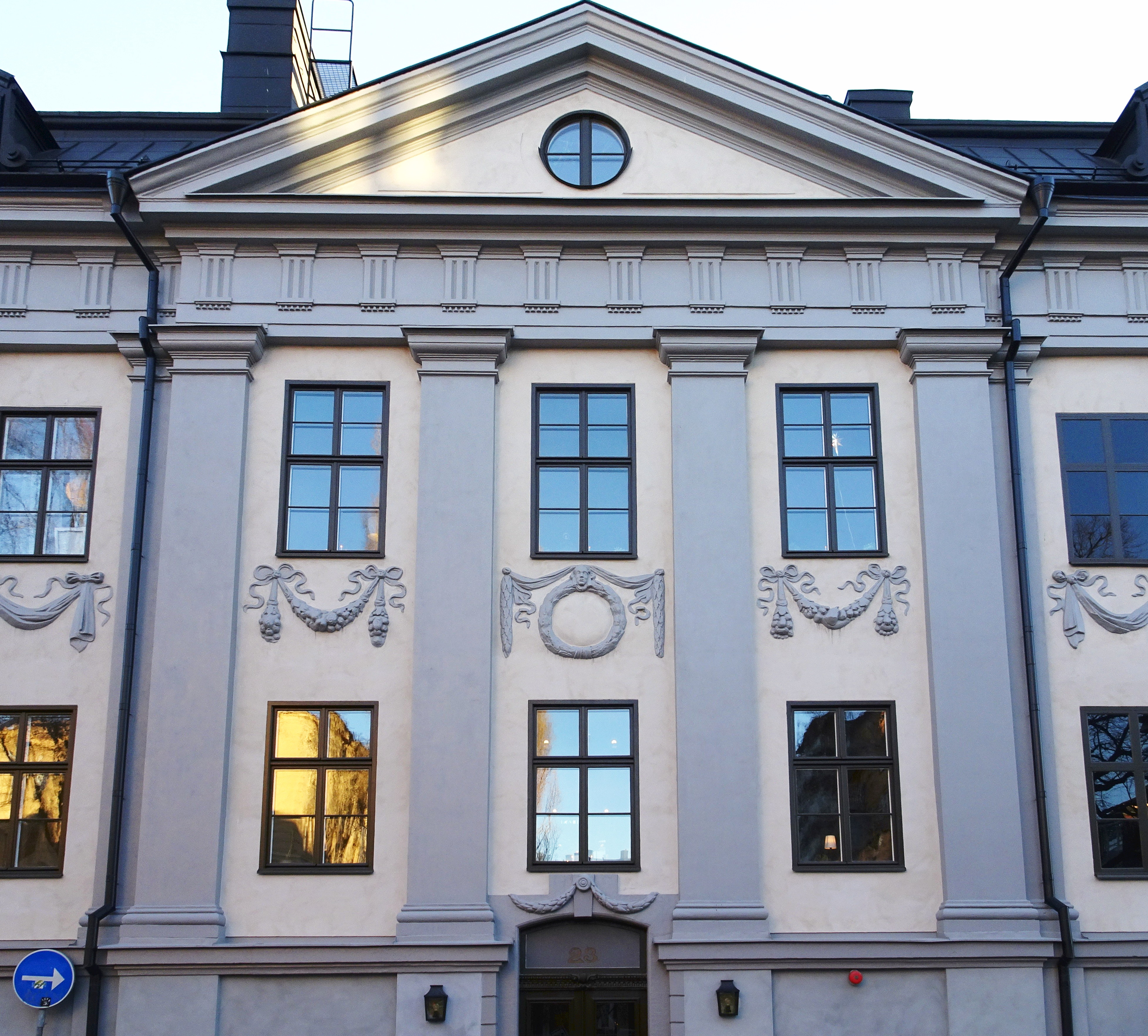
- CBSS Secretariat, Momma Reenstiernas Palats, Wollmar Yxkullsgatan 23
- Abbreviation: CBSS
- Formation: March 1992
- Type: Regional/Intergovernmental Organization
- Headquarters: Stockholm, Sweden
- Members: 10 member countries: Denmark; Estonia; Finland; Germany; Iceland; Latvia; Lithuania; Norway; Poland; Sweden; 10 observer countries: France; Hungary; Italy; Netherlands; Romania; Slovakia; Spain; Ukraine; United Kingdom; United States
- Official language: English
- CBSS current Presidency: Estonia
- Director General (Secretariat): Gustav Lindström
- Main organ: CBSS Secretariat
- Website: cbss.org

The Council of the Baltic Sea States (CBSS) is a regional intergovernmental organisation working on three priority areas: regional identity; regional safety and security; regional sustainability and prosperity. These three priority areas aim to address the themes of sustainable development, environment, sustainable maritime economy, education, labour, culture, youth engagement, civil security, children's rights and human trafficking.

== Member states ==
The CBSS has 11 members – 10 Member States as well as the European Union. The Member States are:

- Denmark
- Estonia
- Finland
- Germany
- Iceland (1995)
- Latvia
- Lithuania
- Norway
- Poland
- Sweden

=== Former Member States ===
- Russia (suspended in March 2022 and withdrew in May the same year)

=== Observer States ===
11 other countries have observer status:

- Belarus (suspended in 2022)
- France
- Hungary
- Italy
- Netherlands
- Romania
- Slovakia
- Spain
- Ukraine
- United Kingdom
- United States

=== Directors General of the CBSS Secretariat ===
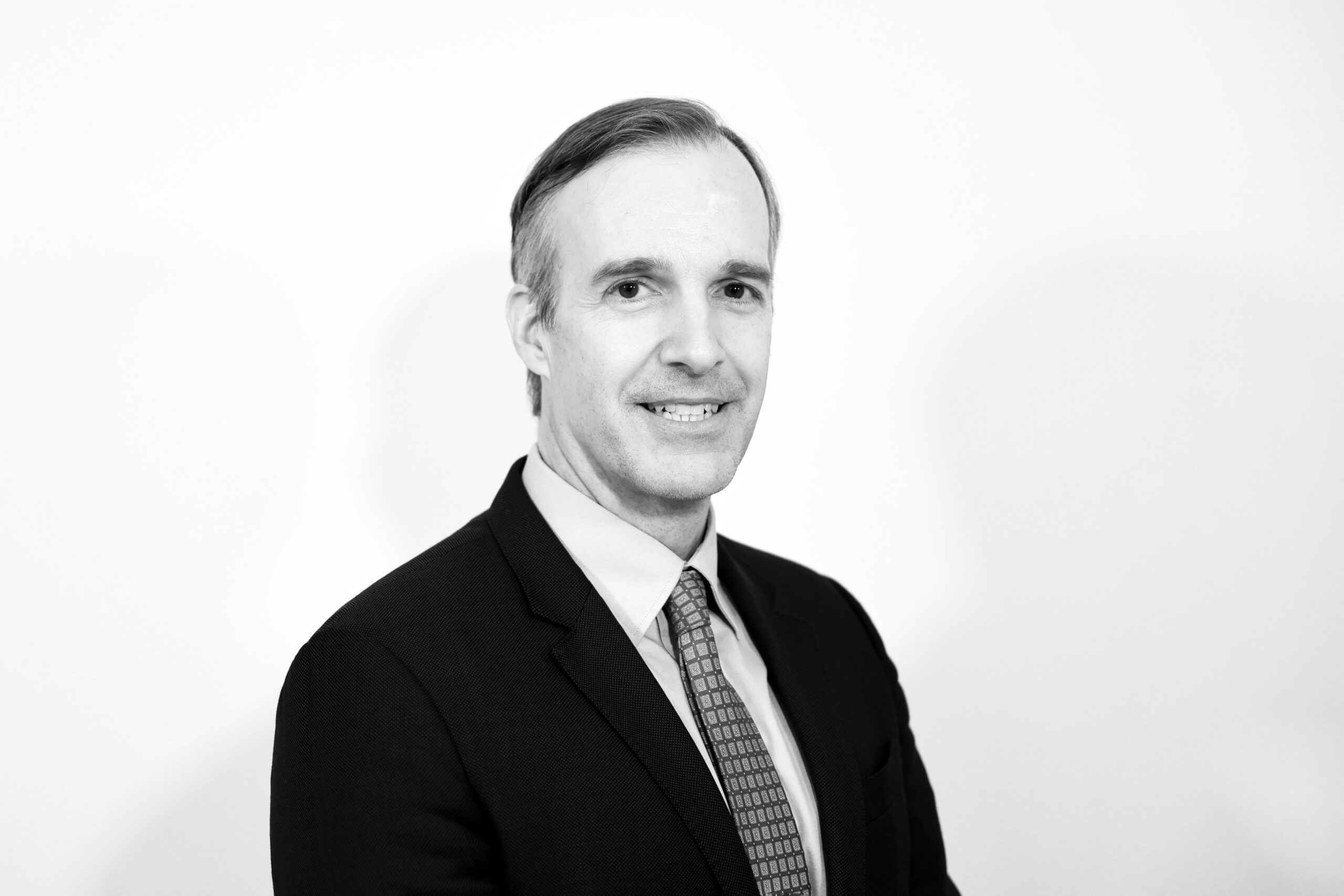
Gustav Lindström – Director General of the Permanent International Secretariat of the Council of the Baltic Sea States (CBSS) in Stockholm (since 2024)

| Jacek Starosciak | 1998–2002 |
| Hannu Halinen | 2002–2005 |
| Gabriele Kötschau | 2005–2010 |
| Jan Lundin | 2010–2016 |
| Maira Mora | 2016–2020 |
| Grzegorz Marek Poznański | 2020–2024 |
| Gustav Lindström | 2024 – current |

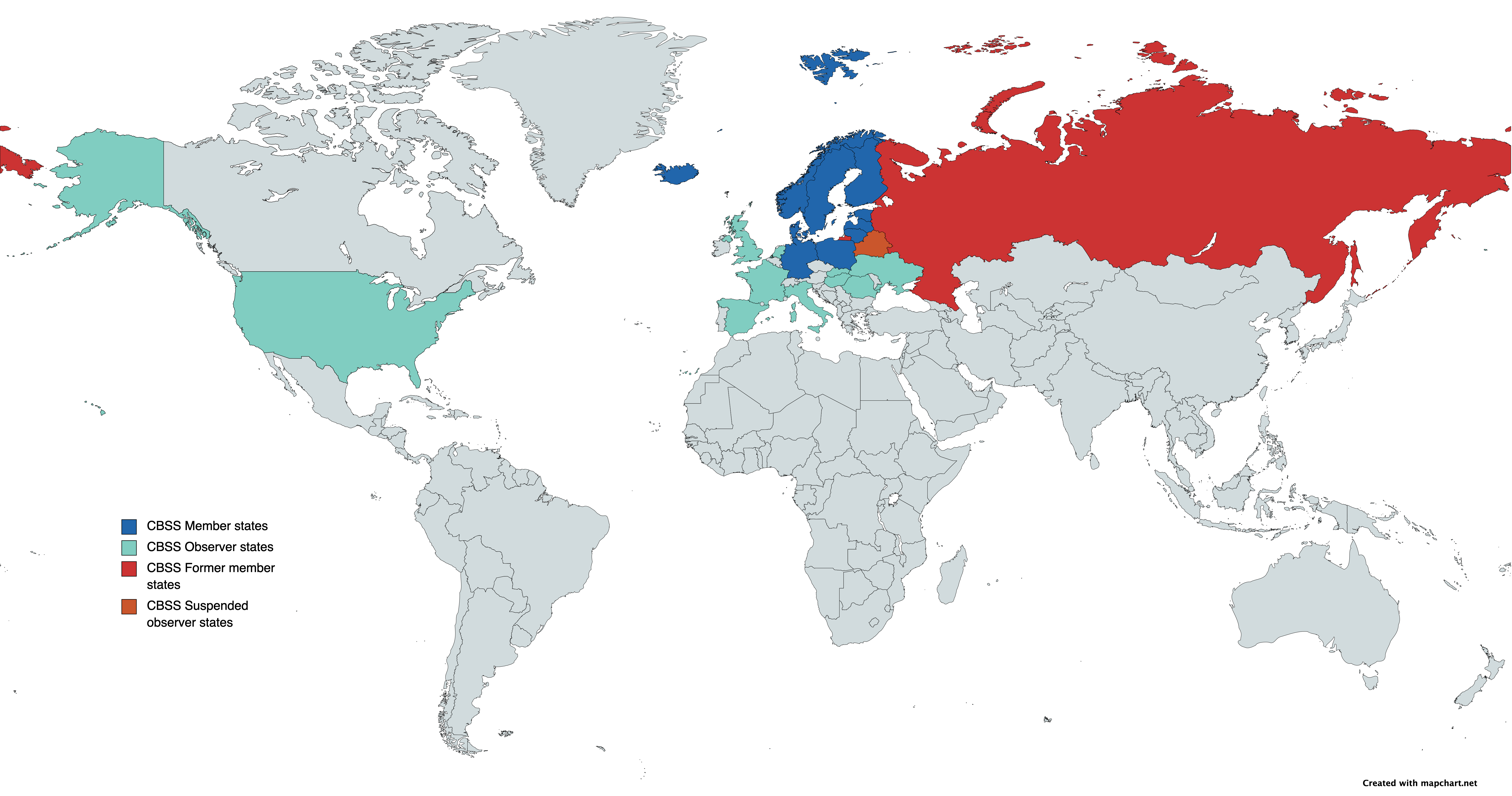
CBSS Members and observers

== History ==
The CBSS was established by the region's Foreign Ministers in Copenhagen in March 1992 as a response to the geopolitical changes that took place in the Baltic Sea region with the end of the Cold War. The CBSS founders were Hans-Dietrich Genscher, Uffe Ellemann-Jensen, Thorvald Stoltenberg, Lennart Meri, Jānis Jurkāns, Algirdas Saudargas, Henning Christophersen, Paavo Väyrynen, Andrei Kozyrev, Margaretha af Ugglas, and Krzysztof Skubiszewski. Since its founding, the CBSS has contributed to ensuring positive developments within the Baltic Sea region and has served as a driving force for multilateral cooperation.

Since 1998 the CBSS has been served by a permanent international Secretariat that is located in Stockholm, Sweden and funded by the Member States. The highest institution of CBSS is the conference of foreign ministers, which convenes once per year.

On 3 March 2022, a declaration from 11 members of the CBSS suspended Russia from the Council's activities with immediate effect as a result of 2022 Russian invasion of Ukraine. Additionally, Belarus, with observer status, was suspended from participating in CBSS activities.

=== Presidencies ===
The Council Presidency rotates between the ten Member States on an annual basis. The European Union does not hold the Presidency. Each Presidency lays down a set of specific priorities to guide the works of the Council for the Presidency year and lasts for one year from 1 July until 30 June.

| Year | Country | Presidency priorities |
|---|---|---|
| 2024-2025 | Estonia | Strengthening resilience and sustainability |
| 2023–2024 | Finland | Comprehensive security, crisis preparedness and resilience |
| 2022–2023 | Germany | Offshore wind energy, dumped munitions, youth |
| 2021–2022 | Norway | Accelerating cooperation on the green transition, fostering regional identity and cooperation, supporting the current mandates on civil protection |
| 2020–2021 | Lithuania | Sustainable Development, green and maritime tourism, civil protection in the Region, fight against human trafficking for labour exploitation in the Region |
| 2019–2020 | Denmark | Making the CBSS a More Flexible Organization |
| 2018–2019 | Latvia | Integrity & Social Security, Dialogue and Responsibility |
| 2017–2018 | Sweden | Sustainability, Continuity and Adaptability |
| 2016–2017 | Iceland | Children, Equality and Democracy |
| 2015–2016 | Poland | Sustainability, Creativity and Safety |
| 2014–2015 | Estonia | Practicality, Efficiency and Cooperation |
| 2013–2014 | Finland | Maritime Policy, Civil Protection and People-to-people Contacts |
| 2012–2013 | Russia | Stricter environmental standards for maritime transport, synchronizing regional strategies, improving the ecological state of the region |
| 2011–2012 | Germany | |
| 2010–2011 | Norway | Fight against trafficking in human beings, Maritime policy |
| 2009–2010 | Lithuania | |
| 2008–2009 | Denmark | |
| 2007–2008 | Latvia | |
| 2006–2007 | Sweden | |
| 2005–2006 | Iceland | |
| 2004–2005 | Poland | |
| 2003–2004 | Estonia | |
| 2002–2003 | Finland | |
| 2001–2002 | Russia | |
| 2000–2001 | Germany | |
| 1999–2000 | Norway | |
| 1998–1999 | Lithuania | |
| 1997–1998 | Denmark | |
| 1996–1997 | Latvia | |
| 1995–1996 | Sweden | |
| 1994–1995 | Poland | |
| 1993–1994 | Estonia | |
| 1992–1993 | Finland | |

== Structure ==
=== Committee of Senior Officials ===
The Committee of Senior Officials (CSO) consists of high-ranking representatives of the Ministries of Foreign Affairs of the ten CBSS Member States as well as of a high-level representative of the European Union. The CSO serves as the main discussion forum and decision-making body for matters related to the work of the Council between Ministerial Sessions. The CSO monitors, facilitates and aims to coordinate the work of all CBSS structures.

The period chaired by each country rotates on an annual basis and follows the Council Presidency. The CSO Chairman is a representative, usually at ambassadorial level, appointed by the Ministry of Foreign Affairs of the country which holds the Council Presidency.

A number of CBSS structures are operating under the auspices of the CSO.

The CSO monitors the work of the Expert Groups and coordinates the work undertaken in the agreed three long-term priorities 'Regional Identity', 'Sustainable & Prosperous Region' and 'Safe & Secure Region'.

=== Expert Groups ===
- CBSS Expert Group on Sustainable Maritime Economy
- CBSS Expert Group on Children at Risk
- CBSS Task Force against Trafficking in Human Beings

The CBSS Expert Group on Sustainable Development, which managed the Baltic 2030 Action Plan, ceased its operations in 2023.

=== Secretariat ===
A Permanent International Secretariat of the CBSS was established following a decision taken at the 7th Ministerial Session of the CBSS in 1998 in Nyborg, Denmark. The Secretariat was officially inaugurated at its premises on the island of Strömsborg in Stockholm on 20 October 1998. From November 2010 until July 2020 the Secretariat was located at Räntmästarhuset at Slussplan 9, Stockholm, Sweden. Since July 2020, Momma Reenstiernas Palace at Wollmar Yxkullsgatan 23 is the new home of the CBSS Secretariat.

The mandate of the Secretariat is as follows:

- to provide technical and organisational support to the Chairman of the CBSS and the structures and working bodies of the Council;
- to ensure continuity and enhanced coordination of CBSS activities;
- to implement the CBSS Information and Communication Strategy;
- to maintain the CBSS archives and information database;
- to maintain contacts with other organisations operating in and around the Baltic Sea region, the national authorities of Member States and the media.

=== Strategic partners ===
Since the 10th Ministerial Session of the CBSS in 2001, the Council has intensified efforts to coordinate CBSS activities with other organisations actively working to advance regional cooperation in the Baltic Sea Region. The CBSS has taken the initiative to organise annual coordination meetings, (organised and presided over by the CSO Chair), with the participation of Baltic Sea regional organisations, thus providing a more structured channel for involving the strategic partners to voice their concerns and coordinate their efforts with the CBSS and other organisations such as:

- B7 Baltic Seven Islands
- BASTUN
- BCCA
- Baltic Sea Forum
- BSPC
- BSRUN
- BSSSC
- BUP
- Business Advisory Council
- CPMR
- HELCOM
- IOM
- NGO Forum
- OECD
- ScanBalt
- UBC

== Long term priorities ==
In June 2014, the Council decided, after an evaluation and review of the CBSS five long-term priorities, to mainstream three renewed long-term priorities for the Council of the Baltic Sea States – Regional Identity, Sustainable & Prosperous Region and Safe & Secure Region.

=== Regional Identity ===
Goal
To foster a Baltic Sea Region identity and intensify contacts supporting its further development
Objective
To develop the concept of Baltic Sea Region identity for and a sense of belonging to the Baltic Sea Region through engagement, participation and multilevel governance, in a community spirit and to create a notion of regional unity across borders by developing people-to-people contacts through dialogue, macro-regional networks and institutions;

=== Sustainable and Prosperous Region ===
Goals
To develop the Baltic Sea Region as a model region of sustainable societies able to manage and use resources efficiently, to tap the economic, technological, ecological and social innovation potential of the region in order to ensure its prosperity, environmental protection and social cohesion; To contribute to the eradication of obstacles hampering the comprehensive and sustainable development of the region
Objectives
To improve the overall competitiveness of the Baltic Sea region through sustainable economic growth and labour markets, research and development, innovative infrastructure, an integrated maritime policy, transport and communications; To support the transition of the Baltic Sea region towards a competitive, green and low-carbon economy thereby ensuring sustainable development and inclusive growth; To support further action to reach a good environmental status and a healthy ecosystem supporting a prosperous Baltic Sea Region; To strengthen the region's capacity to adapt to climate change and the resilience capacity of ecosystems and societies; To ensure further mainstreaming of sustainable development at all levels and in all policy sectors, integrating economic, social and environmental aspects; To promote sustainable and green technologies and initiatives in order to protect the ecosystem and biodiversity of the Baltic Sea region;

=== Safe and Secure Region ===
Goal
To enhance societal security and safety in the Baltic Sea Region and to ensure that people of the Region are protected from and resilient to violence, accidents and emergencies through preparedness, and safeguarded against harm caused by criminal exploitation and human trafficking
Objectives
To counteract all forms of trafficking in human beings, in the Baltic Sea Region via preventive and protective activities and projects based on a coherent and multidisciplinary approach; To promote comprehensive and sustainable child protection in order to prevent and respond to all forms of violence against children through a multi-sectorial approach and increased cooperation between relevant authorities and other stakeholders in the Baltic Sea Region; To strengthen societal resilience to disasters and hazards in all stages of crises through adequate prevention, preparedness, response and recovery; To enhance interoperability and strategic macro-regional cooperation enabling assistance and rapid response to cross-border accidents and emergencies, including disasters that may have cross-border consequences and impact.

== See also ==
- Baltic Assembly
- Baltic Council of Ministers
