= Union of the Baltic Cities =

Regional cooperative organization

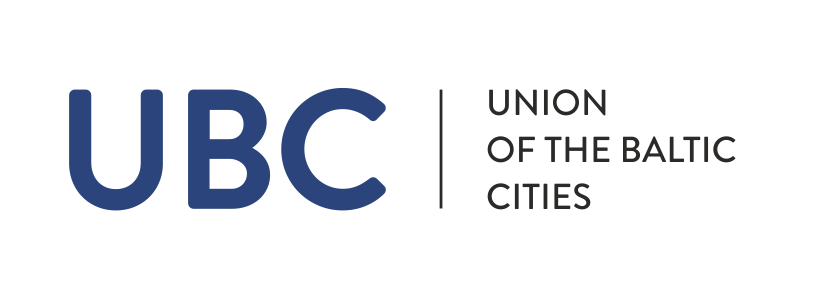
- Formation: 1991
- Headquarters: Gdańsk
- President: Mantas Jurgutis
- Main organ: General Conference, Executive Board
- Website: www.ubc.net

Union of the Baltic Cities (UBC) is a voluntary, proactive network mobilizing the shared potential of the member cities for democratic, economic, social, cultural and environmentally sustainable development of the Baltic Sea region. The Union gathers the cities from nine Baltic Sea countries: Denmark, Estonia, Finland, Germany, Latvia, Lithuania, Norway, Poland, Sweden and Ukraine.

== Origins ==
The Union of the Baltic Cities was founded in Gdańsk, Poland in September 1991, by 32 cities, with the aim of developing cooperation and exchange between its member cities. Inspired in part by the historic example of the Hanseatic League which was one of the first formal institutions established to bolster the Baltic as a cohesive region within Europe. The cities of Gdańsk in Poland and Kalmar in Sweden took the initiative in founding the organization, but Gdańsk was chosen as the organization's headquarters to emphasize the desire to break down historic barriers between Western and Eastern Europe. Anders Engström, who was in office from 1999 to 2001, was the first President of the UBC. Per Boedker Andersen was the UBC President in the term 2001–2019. Since 2019 the office has been held by Mantas Jurgutis.

== Aims ==
The Union states its aims are to:

- Promote, develop and strengthen cooperation and exchange of experience among the cities in the Baltic Sea Region,
- Advocate for common interests of the local authorities in the region,
- Act on behalf of the cities and local authorities in common matters towards regional, national, European and international bodies,
- Strive to achieve sustainable development and optimal economic and social development in the Baltic Sea Region with full respect to European principles of local and regional self-governance and subsidiarity.
- Contribute to joint Baltic identity, cohesion and common understanding in the region.

== Status ==
The Union gathers the cities from nine Baltic Sea countries: Denmark, Estonia, Finland, Germany, Latvia, Lithuania, Norway, Poland, Sweden, and Ukraine.

== Member Cities ==
Country	Cities
Denmark	Aarhus, Guldborgsund
Estonia	Elva, Haapsalu, Pärnu, Rakvere, Tallinn, Tartu
Finland	Espoo, Helsinki, Jyväskylä, Kemi, Kirkkonummi, Kotka, Lathi, Mariehamn, Pori, Porvoo, Turku, Vaasa
Germany	Demmin, Greifswald, Hamburg, Kiel, Rostock
Latvia	Cēsis, Jēkabpils, Jelgava, Liepāja, Rīga, Valmiera
Lithuania	Gargždai, Jonava, Kaunas, Klaipėda, Palanga, Panevėžys, Tauragė
Norway	Arendal, Kristiansand
Poland	Darłowo, Elbląg, Gdańsk, Gdynia, Kołobrzeg, Koszalin, Mielno, Pruszcz Gdański, Reda, Rumia, Sejny, Słupsk, Sopot
Sweden	Gävle, Gotland, Kalmar, Karlskrona, Luleå, Malmö, Örebro, Söderhamn, Umeå, Växjö, Ystad
Ukraine	Associated Cities: Boiarka, Chernihivka, Chernivtsi, Ivano-Frankivsk, Kalush, Kamianets-Podilskyi, Kherson, Khmelnytskyi, Khotyn, Kolomyia, Kramatorsk, Myrove, Novotroitske, Pokrovsk, Rubizhne, Vilnyansk, Vyshhorod, Zaporizhzhia, Rivne region (partner)
