= Nordic Investment Bank =

International financial institution

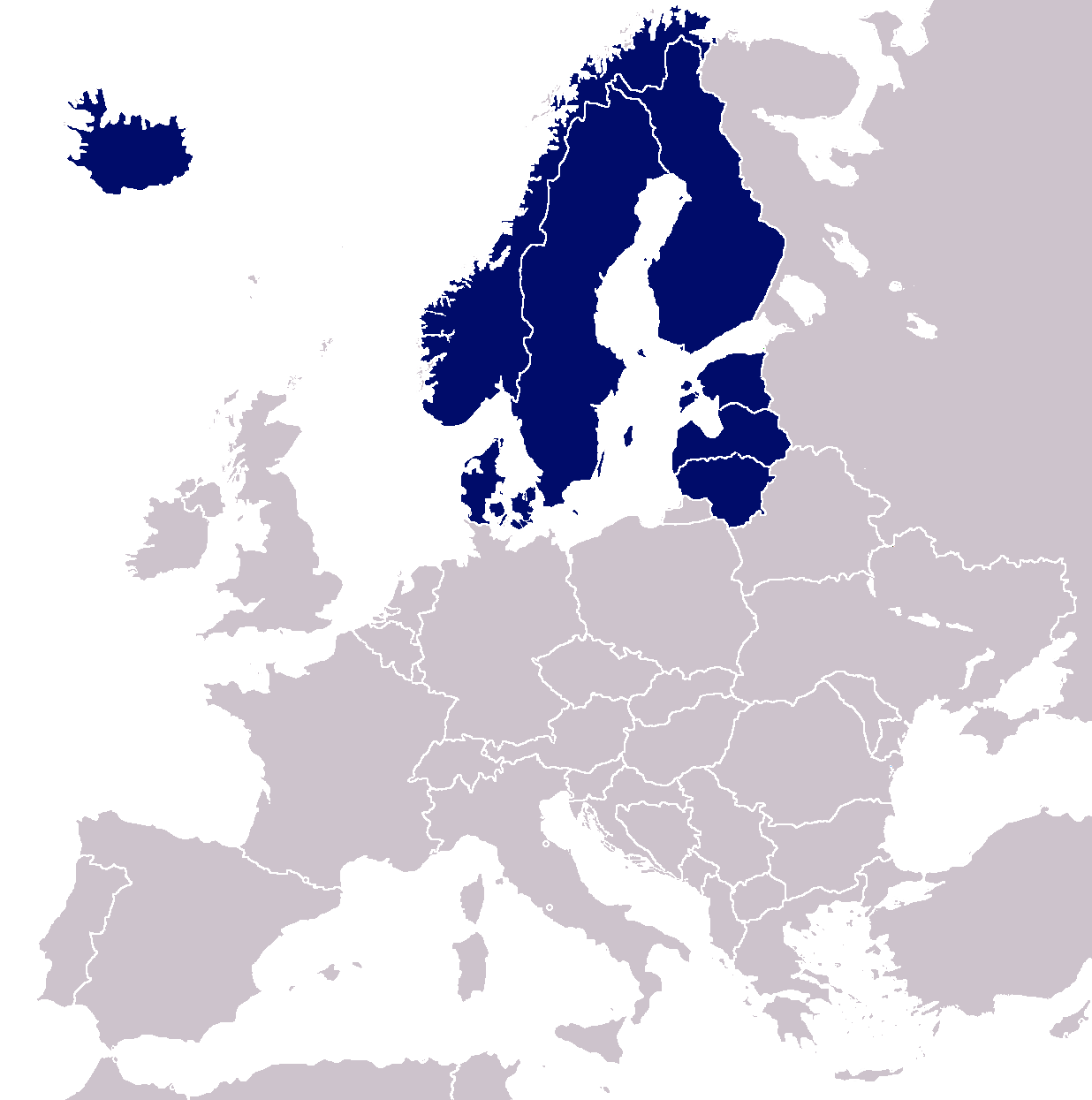
- NIB member states, as of 2005
- Abbreviation: NIB
- Type: International financial institution
- Headquarters: Helsinki, Finland
- Members: Denmark Faroe Islands Greenland; Estonia; Finland Åland Islands; Iceland; Latvia; Lithuania; Norway; Sweden
- President: André Küüsvek
- Website: www.nib.int

The Nordic Investment Bank (NIB) is an international financial institution founded in 1975 by the five Nordic countries (Denmark, Finland, Iceland, Norway, and Sweden). In 2005, the three Baltic states (Estonia, Latvia, and Lithuania) also became members of the Bank. NIB’s headquarters are located in Helsinki, Finland. NIB acquires the funds for its lending by borrowing on the international capital markets.

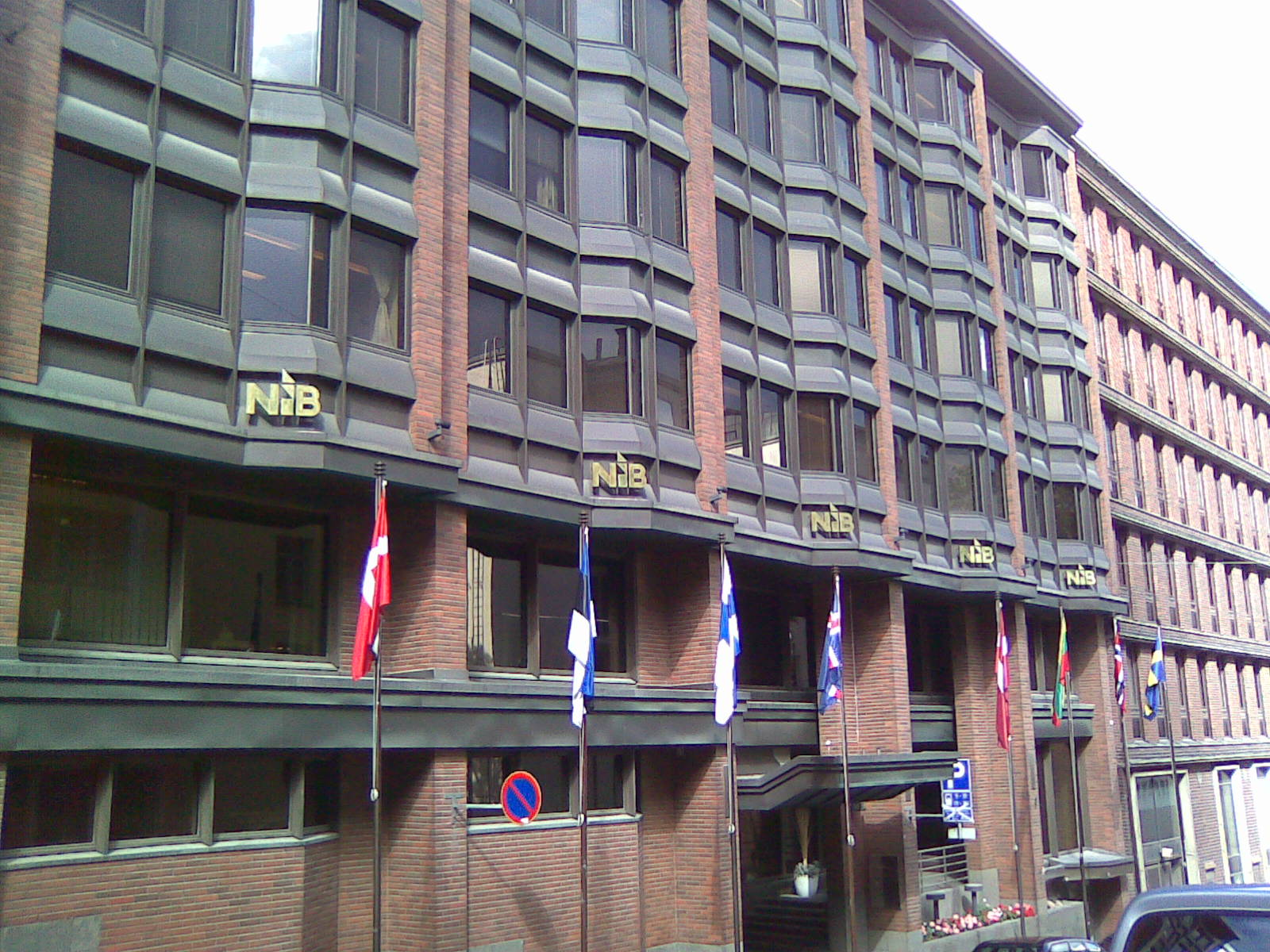
Nordic Investment Bank offices in Helsinki.

== Strategy ==
NIB offers loans to customers in both the private and public sectors. The Bank's primary lending areas are:

- Connectivity & Consumer
- Industry & Real Estate
- Project & Structured Finance
- Public Sector & Utilities
- Financial Institutions

In addition, NIB offers sustainability-linked loans that provide financial incentives to help companies reach their sustainability objectives. The Bank acquires the funds for its lending by borrowing from international capital markets.

== Structure and management ==
Each member country designates a Governor to the Bank's Board of Governors, which is the supreme decision-making body. The Control Committee is the Bank's supervisory body. The Board of Directors makes policy decisions concerning the operations and approves the financial transactions proposed by NIB's President.

Presidents:

- Bert Lindström, Sweden, 1975 – 1986
- Jannik Lindbæk, Norway, 1986 – 1994
- Jón Sigurðsson, Iceland, 1994 – 2005
- Johnny Åkerholm, Finland, 2005 – 2012
- Henrik Normann, Denmark, 2012 – 2021
- André Küüsvek, Estonia, 2021 – present

The Bank has a staff of approximately 250 employees, both from the member region and beyond. NIB's headquarters are located in Helsinki, Finland, and English is the official language of the Bank.
