= 2025 United Nations Ocean Conference =

2025 United Nations conference

- Begins: 9 June 2025
- Ends: 13 June 2025
- Locations: Nice, France
- Inaugurated: 2017
- Previous event: 2022
- Next event: 2028
- Organiser: France; Costa Rica
- Website: www.un.org/en/civil-society/un-ocean-conference

The 2025 United Nations Ocean Conference (officially the 2025 United Nations Conference to Support the Implementation of Sustainable Development Goal 14; abbreviated UNOC3) was a United Nations conference held in Nice, France, from 9–13 June 2025 which sought to mobilize action for the conservation and sustainable use of the oceans, seas and marine resources. The conference was the third of its kind, following the 2017 conference in New York City and a second in Lisbon. It was jointly organized by France and Costa Rica.

== Background ==
The goal of the UN Ocean Conferences is to support the implementation of Sustainable Development Goal 14, "Life below water." The official mission statement of SDG 14 reads: "Conserve and sustainably use the oceans, seas and marine resources for sustainable development." The 2025 conference was the third, following the first in New York (2017) and another in Lisbon (2022).

== Participation ==
The conference was attended by government representatives, as well as intergovernmental and non-governmental organizations, financial and educational institutions, scientists, and Indigenous representatives.

It brought 15,000 participants, including more than 60 heads of state and government, with over 450 side events and nearly 100,000 visitors.

=== Action Panels ===
The 10 Ocean Action Panels produced forward-looking recommendations to guide implementation across key themes, from marine pollution and nature-based solutions to the role of women, youth, and Indigenous Peoples in ocean governance.

Ocean Action Panel	Description
Action Panel 1	Conserving, sustainably managing and restoring marine and coastal ecosystems, including deep-sea ecosystems
Action Panel 2	Increasing ocean-related scientific cooperation, knowledge, capacity-building, marine technology and education to strengthen the science-policy interface for ocean health
Action Panel 3	Mobilizing finance for ocean actions in support of Sustainable Development Goal 14
Action Panel 4	Preventing and significantly reducing marine pollution of all kinds, in particular from land-based activities
Action Panel 5	Fostering sustainable fisheries management, including supporting small-scale fishers
Action Panel 6	Advancing sustainable ocean-based economies, sustainable maritime transport and coastal community resilience, leaving no one behind
Action Panel 7	Leveraging ocean, climate and biodiversity interlinkages
Action Panel 8	Promoting and supporting all forms of cooperation, especially at the regional and subregional levels
Action Panel 9	Promoting the role of sustainable food from the ocean for poverty eradication and food security
Action Panel 10	Enhancing the conservation and sustainable use of oceans and their resources by implementing international law as reflected in the United Nations Convention on the Law of the Sea

=== Outcomes ===
==== Action Plan ====
The summit concluded with the declaration of the so-called Nice Action Plan. This political document emphasizes the vital importance of the ocean to life on our planet and its essential role in mitigating climate change. It is evaluated as a major achievement for the UN and as a vital step to reversing damage done to the climate.

It calls for concrete steps to expand marine protected areas, decarbonize maritime transport, combat marine pollution, and mobilize finance for vulnerable coastal and island nations, among others.

Articles 1 through 5 declare their strong commitment to conserve and use our ocean, seas and marine resources sustainably, emphasizing the utilization of existing frameworks which implement the United Nations Convention on the Law of the Sea.

Article 6 through 18 is titled "Conserving the ocean and its ecosystems." This section shows the importance of existing frameworks such as the United Nation Framework Convention on Climate Change, the Paris agreement, the Convention on Biological Diversity and the Kunming-Montreal Global Biodiversity Framework, as well as 30 by 30 target to protect the ocean, with interlinking the ocean, climate and biodiversity. It refers to the sea level rise in relation with climate change and marine pollution, respecting the rights of the vulnerable or indigenous peoples. Further scientific and technological development are necessary especially on deep sea ecosystems, as well as sharing the same view among states.

Articles 19 through 25 refer to "Promoting sustainable ocean-based economies." This section focuses on balancing ecosystems and economies. It highlights the ocean's fundamental role in global economies and its crucial contribution to alleviating poverty and hunger, and underscores the necessity of cooperation with international trade institutions—particularly the World Trade Organization—in accordance with appropriate management tools. Ensuring sustainable fisheries and aquaculture is essential, as well as securing the viability of sustainable small-scale fisheries.

Article 26 through 34 is titled "Accelerating action." This final section calls for further action toward sustainable ocean governance. It emphasizes the importance of multilateral ocean governance and the integration of ocean-related issues into relevant multilateral efforts and forums. It calls for strengthening cooperation and partnerships, advancing science and knowledge, promoting finance and investment, increasing voluntary commitments, and enhancing awareness and education at different levels. States are also encouraged to map coastal and marine ecosystems and the ocean floor, as well as to ratify and accede to the agreement on the Conservation and Sustainable Use of Marine Biological Diversity of Areas beyond National Jurisdiction.

==== High Seas Treaty ====
The High Seas Treaty was a major focus. During the summit, the treaty was ratified by 19 nations, bringing the total number of ratifications to 51 out of the required 60. Yet more states ratified the treaty following the conference, and it entered into force when Morocco ratified in September 2025.

==== Voluntary commitments ====
At the conference, the Solomon Islands and Vanuatu reached an agreement on the creation of the Melanesian Ocean Reserve, which will safeguard the two countries' national waters, as well as those of Papua New Guinea and the exclusive economic zone of New Caledonia, for a total of more than 6,000,000 square kilometres (2,300,000 mi^{2}). It will be the world's first multinational Indigenous-led marine reserve. French Polynesia also announced the creation of a 4,800,000 square kilometres (1,900,000 mi^{2}) marine protected area. Spain has announced its intention to create five new protected areas.

The European Commission pledged €1 billion (US$1,162,858,000) to marine conservation. Germany launched a programme to remove underwater munitions from its seas, and New Zealand committed US$52 million to ocean governance.

The 37-country Coalition for a Quiet Ocean was launched during the conference. Led by Panama and Canada, the mission of the coalition is to reduce harmful noise pollution in the ocean. Noise pollution can interfere with animals' ability to navigate, communicate, and find food, threatening marine biodiversity.

Indonesia, in collaboration with the World Bank and other partners, introduced a Coral Bond as an innovative financing mechanism to attract private investment for the conservation of coral reef ecosystems within the country's marine protected areas.

Italy pledged €6.5 million to enhance Coast Guard monitoring capacities in marine protected areas and around offshore oil platforms, including the deployment of satellite-based systems capable of identifying oil spills in real time.

Canada allocated US$9 million to the Ocean Risk and Resilience Action Alliance to support Small Island Developing States and coastal developing countries in strengthening climate resilience through nature-based approaches.

Spain announced plans to establish five additional marine protected areas, expanding conservation coverage to 25 per cent of its marine territory.

A group of United Nations agencies, together with international partners, initiated a co-creation process for One Ocean Finance, aimed at mobilizing substantial new funding from ocean-reliant industries and blue economy sectors.

== Sequel conference ==
The next Ocean Conference is planned to take place in 2028 in South Korea.

== See also ==
- United Nations Ocean Conference
- 2017 United Nations Ocean Conference
- UN-Oceans
- Sustainable Development Goal 14
- United Nations Conference on Sustainable Development
- Sustainability and environmental management § Oceans
- Ocean governance
- Spaceship Earth
- Effects of global warming on oceans
- Resource management
