= 2017 United Nations Ocean Conference =

2017 United Nations conference promoting ocean conservation

The United Nations Ocean Conference
- Begins: 5 June 2017
- Ends: 9 June 2017
- Locations: UN HQ, New York, United States

The 2017 United Nations Ocean Conference was a United Nations conference that took place on 5-9 June 2017 which sought to mobilize action for the conservation and sustainable use of the oceans, seas and marine resources.

The Earth's waters are said to be "under threat as never before", with pollution, overfishing, and the effects of climate change severely damaging the health of our oceans. For instance as oceans are warming and becoming more acidic, biodiversity is becoming reduced and changing currents will cause more frequent storms and droughts. Every year around 8 million metric tons of plastic waste leak into the ocean and make it into the circular ocean currents. This causes contamination of sediments at the sea-bottom and causes plastic waste to be embedded in the aquatic food chain. It could lead to oceans containing more plastics than fish by 2050 if nothing is done. Key habitats such as coral reefs are at risk and noise pollution are a threat to whales, dolphins, and other species. Furthermore almost 90 percent of fish stocks are overfished or fully exploited which cost more than $80 billion a year in lost revenues.

UN Secretary-General António Guterres stated that decisive, coordinated global action can solve the problems created by humanity. Peter Thomson, President of the UN General Assembly, highlighted the conference's significance, saying "if we want a secure future for our species on this planet, we have to act now on the health of the ocean and on climate change".

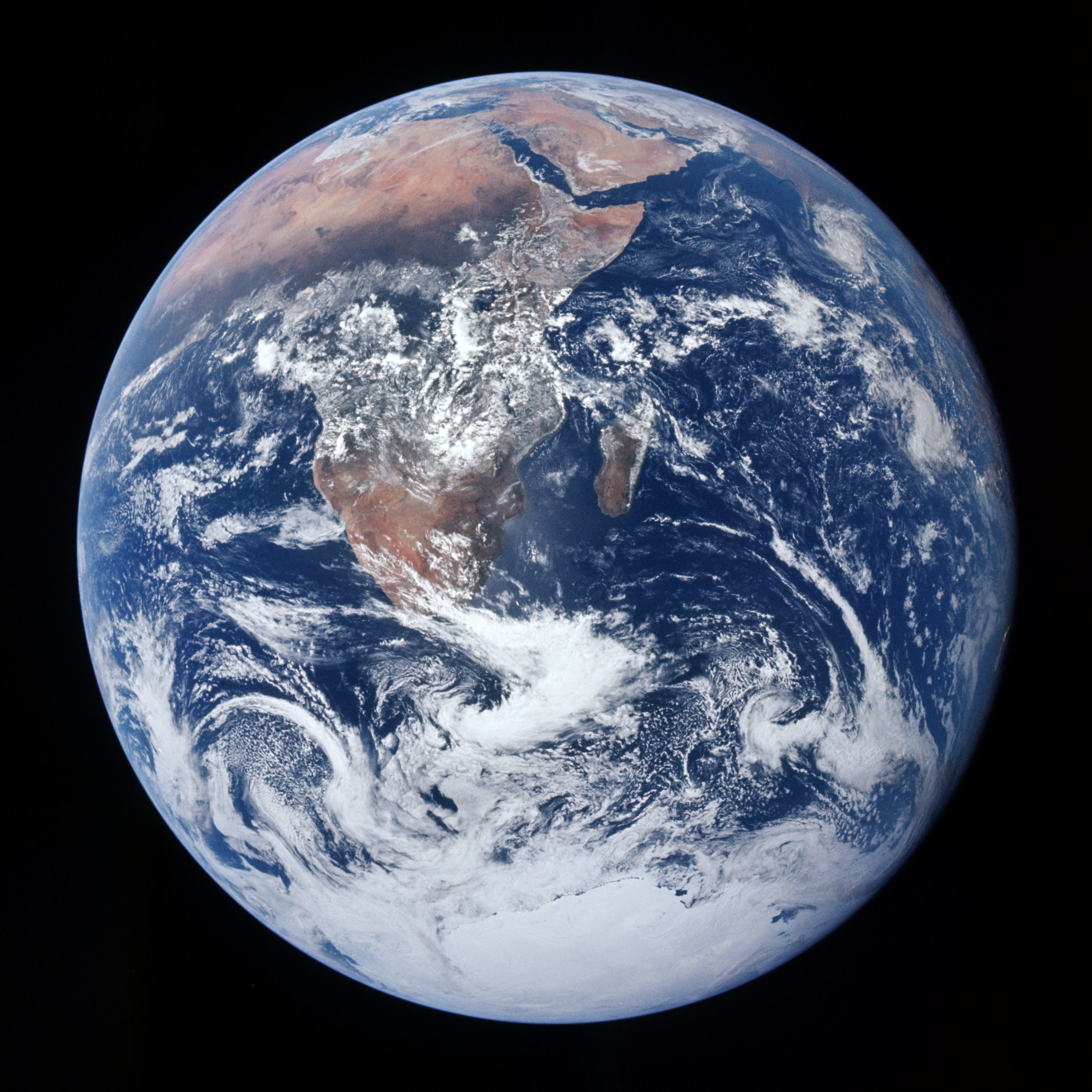
Earth is often called the "blue planet" as oceans cover over 70 percent of the planet, giving it a markedly blue appearance when seen from space (here photographed by Apollo 17 in 1972).

The conference sought to find ways and urge for the implementation of Sustainable Development Goal 14. Its theme is "Our oceans, our future: partnering for the implementation of Sustainable Development Goal 14". It also asked governments, UN bodies, and civil society groups to make voluntary commitments for action to improve the health of the oceans with over 1,000 commitments − such as on managing protected areas − being made.

Since 2014, the UN Ocean Conference and Our Ocean Conference have gathered over 2,160 financial and other quantifiable pledges, mobilising more than $130 billion.

== Participation ==
Participants include heads of State and Government, civil society representatives, business people, actors, academics and scientists and ocean and marine life advocates from around 200 countries. Around 6,000 leaders gathered for the conference over the course of the week.

The Governments of Fiji and Sweden had the co-hosting responsibilities of the Conference.

7 partnership dialogues with a rich state-developed state theme were co-chaired by Australia-Kenya, Iceland-Peru, Canada-Senegal, Estonia-Grenada, Italy-Palau, Monaco-Mozambique and Norway-Indonesia.

Ministers from small island states such as Palau, Fiji and Tuvalu pleaded for help as for them the issue is existential not just on the long-term.

=== Outcomes ===
Over 1,300 voluntary commitments have been made which UN Under-Secretary-General for Economic and Social Affairs Wu Hongbo called "truly impressive" and stated that they now comprise "an ocean solution registry" via the public online platform. 44 percent of the commitments came from governments, 19 percent from NGOs, 9 percent from UN entities and 6 percent from the private sector.

Delegates from China, Thailand, Indonesia and the Philippines pledged to work to keep plastics out of the seas. The Maldives announced a phase out of its non-biodegradable plastic and Austria pledged to reduce the number of plastic bags used per person to 25 a year by 2019.

Several nations announced plans for new marine protected areas. China plans to establish 10 to 20 "demonstration zones" by 2020 and introduced a regulation which requires that 35 percent of the country's shoreline should be natural by 2020. Gabon announced that it will create one of Africa's largest marine protected areas with around 53,000 square kilometres of ocean when combined with its existing zones. New Zealand affirmed the government's commitment to establishing the Kermadec/Rangitahua Ocean Sanctuary, which − with 620,000 square kilometres − would be one of the world's largest fully protected areas. Pakistan also announced its first marine protected area.

The US-based international wildlife organisation Wildlife Conservation Society created the MPA Fund in 2016 as well as the blue moon fund for a combined $15 million commitment which aims to create 3.7 million square kilometers of new marine protected areas with The Tiffany & Co. Foundation adding a $1 million grant toward this fund in the week of the conference. Germany's Federal Minister for the Environment, Nature Conservation and Nuclear Safety Barbara Hendricks also pledged to allocate €670 million for marine conservation projects and made 11 voluntary commitments.

Deputy Director-General of the State Oceanic Administrations Lin Shanqing of China − the world's main fish producer and exporter − stated that the country would be "willing, based on its own development experience, to work actively for the establishment in the area of the ocean of an open, inclusive, concrete, pragmatic, mutually beneficial and win-win blue partnership with other countries and international organizations".

The conference ended with the adoption by consensus of a 14-point Call for Action by the 193 UN member states in which they affirmed their "strong commitment to conserve and sustainably use our oceans, seas and marine resources tor sustainable development". With this call, the Ocean Conference also sought to raise global awareness of ocean problems.

=== Private sector ===
On 9 June an official side event of the United Nations Ocean Conference for addressing ways by which the private sector provides practical solutions to address the problems such as by improving energy efficiency, waste management and introducing market-based tools to shift investment, subsidy and production.

Nine of the world's biggest fishing companies from Asia, Europe and the US have signed up for The Seafood Business for Ocean Stewardship (SeaBOS) initiative, supported by the Stockholm Resilience Centre, aiming to end unsustainable practices.

=== Research and technology projects ===
At the conference Indonesia published its vessel monitoring system (VMS) publicly revealing the location and activity of its commercial fishing boats on the Global Fishing Watch public mapping platform. Brian Sullivan states that the platform is can easily incorporate additional data sources which may allow "mov[ing] from raw data to quickly producing dynamic visualizations and reporting that promote scientific discovery and support policies for better fishery management".

Irina Bokova of UNESCO notes that "we cannot manage what we cannot measure, and no single country is able to measure the myriad changes taking place in the ocean", and asks for more maritime research and the sharing of knowledge to craft common science-based policies.
Peru co-chaired the "Partnership Dialogue 6 – Increasing scientific knowledge, and developing research capacity and transfer of marine technology" with Iceland.
On 7 June researchers at the Dutch The Ocean Cleanup foundation published a study according to which rivers − such as the Yangtze − carry an around 1.15–2.41 million tonnes of plastic into the sea every year.

== Obstacles to implementation ==
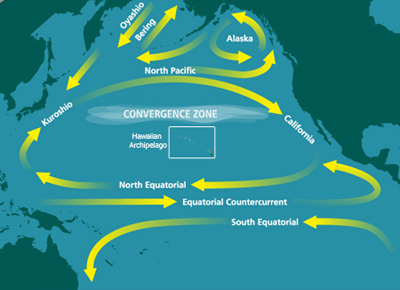
North Pacific Subtropical Convergence Zone − the location of the Great Pacific Garbage Patch

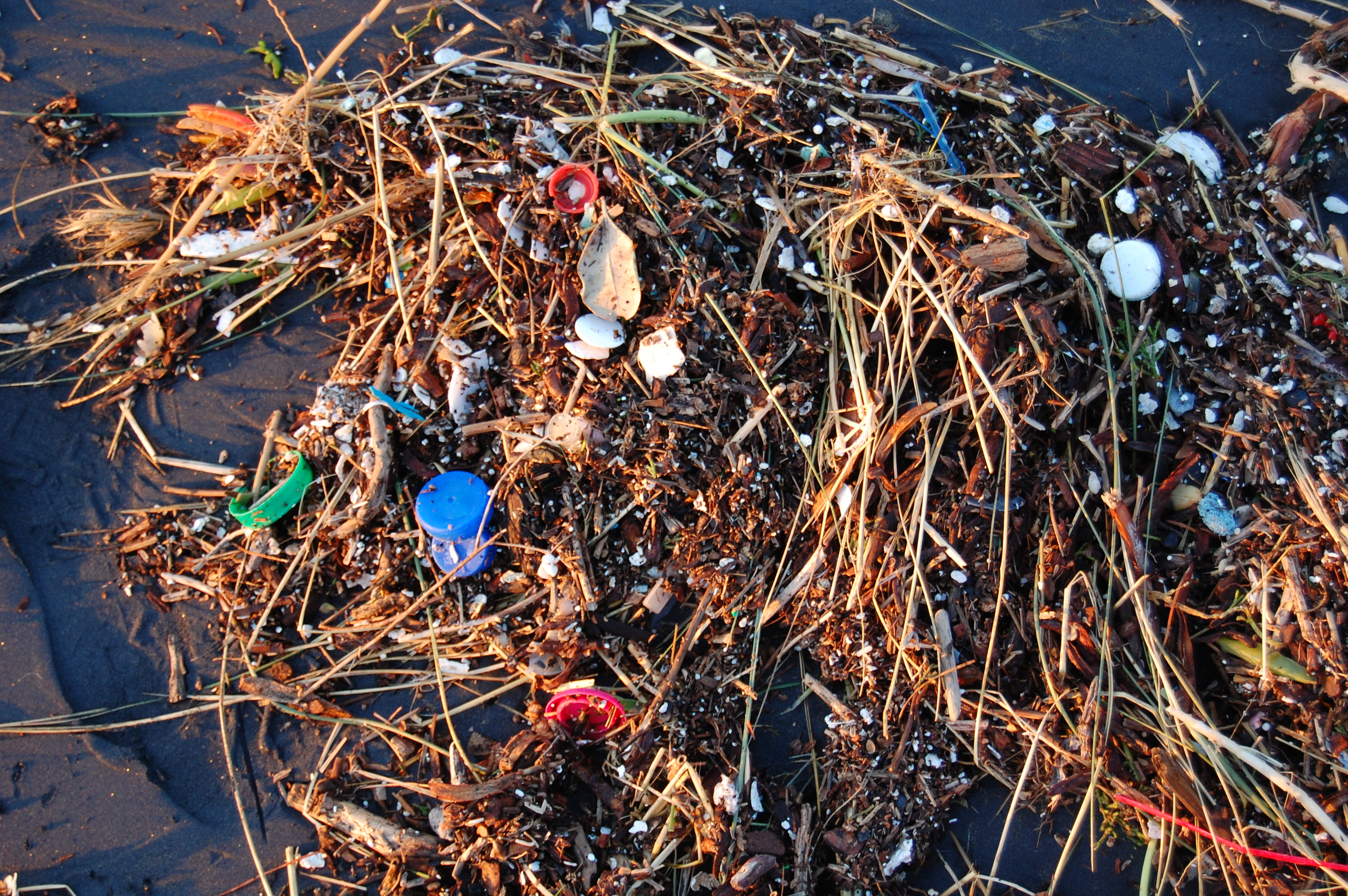
An example of sea pollution which the conference sought to avert

UN Secretary-General António Guterres warned that unless nations overcome short-term territorial and resource interests the state of the oceans will continue to deteriorate. He also names "the artificial dichotomy" between jobs and healthy oceans as one of the main challenges and asks for strong political leadership, new partnerships and concrete steps.

Deputy Secretary-General of the United Nations Amina J Mohammed warns about the harm of overlooking the climate concerns in turn for perceived "national gain", claiming that "a moral obligation to the world which [one] live[s] on" exists.

India, attended indirectly via two non-governmental organisations until 9 June when Minister of State for External Affairs M J Akbar told the conference that the negative impact of overfishing, habitat destruction, pollution and climate change are becoming increasingly clear and that the time for action would be "already long overdue".

Bolivia's President Evo Morales told the conference that, one of the world's main polluters, the United States denied science, turned its backs on multilateralism, and attempted to deny a future to upcoming generations by its national government deciding to leave the Paris agreement, making "it the main threat to Mother Earth and life itself". Albert II, Prince of Monaco called Trump's withdrawal "catastrophic" and the reaction from US mayors, governors and many in the corporate world as "wonderful". On 30 May Sweden's deputy prime minister Isabella Lövin stated that the United States is resisting plans to highlight how climate change is disrupting life in the oceans at the conference, that the US has negatively affected preparations and that "the decline of the oceans is really a threat to the entire planet" with a "need to start working together". Lövin also makes note of difficulties to engage with Washington in the conference, partly because key posts at the National Oceanic and Atmospheric Administration remain unfilled since the end of the Obama administration.

UNCTAD Secretary-General Mukhisa Kituyi states that subsidies from wealthy governments encourage overfishing, overcapacity and may contribute to illegal and unregulated fishing, creating food insecurity, unemployment and poverty for people relying mainly on fish as their primary source of nourishment or livelihood.

== Impact and progress ==
Marine biologist Ayana Elizabeth Johnson notes that the UN's work alone is not nearly enough and that for a solution to this existential crisis of the health of our global environment, strong and inspired leadership at all levels – from mayors, to governors, CEOs, scientists, artists and presidents is needed.

In 2010 the international community agreed to protect 10% of the ocean by 2020 in the Convention on Biological Diversity's Strategic Plan for Biodiversity 2011–2020 and Sustainable Development Goal 14. However as of June 2017 less than 3% of the ocean are under some form of protection. Pledges made during the conference would add around an additional 4.4 percent of protected marine areas, increasing the protected total to around 7.4% of the ocean. A later study (in 2018), reveals that 3,6% was protected.

Peter Thomson called the conference was a success, stating that he was "satisfied with [its] results", that the conference "held at a very critical time" has "turned the tide on marine pollution". He says that "we are now working around the world to restore a relationship of balance and respect towards the ocean".

Elizabeth Wilson, director of international conservation at Pew Charitable Trusts thinks that this meeting "will be followed by a whole series of other meetings that we hope will be impacted in a positive way".

The next conference was scheduled for 2020, but postponed due to the COVID-19 pandemic. Portugal's Minister for the Seas, Ana Paula Vitorino stated that Lisbon would like to host the next event in 2020. Kenya's Foreign Affairs Cabinet Secretary Amina Mohamed also offered for Kenya to host the next event.

== Culture and society ==
The event coincided with the World Oceans Day on 8 June and started with the World Environment Day on 5 June.

On 4 June the World Ocean Festival took place at New York City's Governors Island. The festival was hosted by the City of New York, organized by the Global Brain Foundation and was free and open to the public.

China announced a new international sailing competition and Noahs Sailing Club press officer Rebecca Wang stated that "sailing allows for a better appreciation of the ocean and the natural environment. Many wealthy Chinese think of luxury yachts when they think of maritime sports, and we're trying to foster a maritime culture that's more attuned to the environment".

Users of social media worldwide use the hashtag #SaveOurOcean for discussion, information and media related to the conference and its goals. The #CleanSeas cyber campaign calls on governments, industry and citizens to end excessive, wasteful usage of single-use plastic and eliminate microplastics in cosmetics with its petition getting signed by more than 1 million people.

== Further UN Ocean Conferences ==
After this first conference in New York, a second United Nations Ocean Conference (UNOC2) was held in Lisbon, from 27 June to 1 July 2022. It was organized jointly by Portugal and Kenya. France and Costa Rica jointly organized the third United Nations Ocean Conference (UNOC3) in Nice, from 9 to 13 June 2025. The Fourth UN Ocean Conference (UNOC4) was announced to be co-hosted by Chile and the Republic of Korea in 2028.

== See also ==
- United Nations Ocean Conference
- United Nations-Oceans
- United Nations Conference on Sustainable Development
- National interest
- Collective problem solving
- Global catastrophic risk
- March for Science
- Global change
- Spaceship Earth
- World community
- Global citizenship
- Sustainability and environmental management § Oceans
- Ocean governance
- Resource management
