= Sea switch =

Submersible switching unit in marine technology

A sea switch is a submersible switching unit in marine technology.
