= Ocean governance =

Policy, actions and affairs regarding the world's oceans

Ocean governance is the conduct of the policy, actions and affairs regarding the world's oceans. Within governance, it incorporates the influence of non-state actors, i.e. stakeholders, NGOs and so forth, therefore the state is not the only acting power in policy making. However, ocean governance is complex because much of the ocean is a commons that is not 'owned' by any single person or nation/state. There is a belief more strongly in the US than other countries that the "invisible hand" is the best method to determine ocean governance factors. These include factors such as what resources we consume, what price we should pay for them, and how we should use them. The underlying reasoning behind this is the market has to have the desire in order to promote environmental protection, however this is rarely the case. This term is referred to as a market failure. Market failures and government failures are the leading causes of ocean governance complications. As a result, humankind has tended to overexploit marine resources, by treating them as shared resources while not taking equal and collective responsibility in caring for them.

Effective ocean governance requires robust international agreements. In short, there is a need for some form of governance to maintain the ocean for its various uses, preferably in a sustainable manner. Over the years, a number of international treaties have been signed in order to regulate international ocean governance. Current international policy goals to create more sustainable relations with the ocean are captured in Sustainable Development Goal 14 "life below sea".

== Legal framework ==
There are two major international legal organizations that are involved in ocean governance on a global scale, the International Maritime Organization and the UNCLOS. The International Maritime Organization (IMO), which was ratified in 1958, is responsible mainly for maritime safety, liability and compensation and they have held some conventions on marine pollution related to shipping incidents.

=== IMO marine pollution conventions ===
- 1972 – Convention on the Prevention of Marine Pollution by Dumping of Wastes and Other Matter (LDC)
- 1969 – International Convention Relating to Intervention on the High Seas in Cases of Oil Pollution Casualties (INTERVENTION).
- 1973 – International Convention for the Prevention of Pollution from Ships, as modified by the Protocol of 1978 relating thereto (MARPOL 73/78).
- 1990 – International Convention on Oil Pollution Preparedness, Response, and Cooperation (OPRC).
- 2000 – Protocol on Preparedness, Response and Cooperation to Pollution Incidents by Hazardous and Noxious Substances (HNS Protocol).

The IMO sees the regulation of marine pollution as one of its most important responsibilities. In particular, the MARPOL convention is regarded as one of its greatest successes. The result of MARPOL has meant that oil pollution has decreased due to a change in equipment standards of oil tankers to prevent operational discharge of oil. However, the main organisation concerned with the economic, environmental, ethical, peace and security issues is the United Nations Convention on the Law of the Sea (UNCLOS).

=== United Nations Convention on the Law of the Sea (UNCLOS) ===
UNCLOS was first established under the Third UNCLOS in 1973 and fully ratified in 1982. The main aim was to adopt a regime of national seas and international waters on a global scale. It was agreed that the jurisdictional boundaries of individual states were to be enlarged to 200 nautical miles off a state's coastline. Coastal states were given greater rights to control these areas for protective purposes and the exploitation of natural resources. In total 38 million square nautical miles of ocean space was put under jurisdiction under the exclusive economic zones (EEZ) and the legal framework concerning the continental shelf and territorial sea were altered.

However, the Convention did not come into full effect despite some progress between 1973 and 1982. This was mainly due to a dispute over mineral resources, particularly manganese nodules in the deep-oceans. Developing countries preferred treating these minerals as "common heritage," that via an international organization would allow them to benefit from a sharing of these resources. However, the developed world, in particular the United States, was not in favor of this and preferring a first-come, first-served approach, with some suggesting this position was based on self-economic interest. Only in 1994 did the United States renounce their objections so that the Convention could be enacted.

==== Institutions established by UNCLOS ====
- International Seabed Authority (ISA) – An independent international institution that came into force in 1994, with the aim of acting as a custodian of ocean commons (the Common Heritage of Mankind). However its main purpose is to regulate deep seabed mining.
- Commission on the Limits of the Continental Shelf (CLCS) – Assists states in affairs to do with the establishment of outer limits of their continental shelf.
- Regime for the Peaceful Settlement of Disputes and the International Tribunal for the Law of the Sea (ITLOS) – This was established to handle disputes with the application and interpretations of UNCLOS.
- The Meeting of the State Parties (SPLOS) - carried out to conform with the article 319, paragraph 2 (e) to the LOSC Convention and is concerned with administrative matters.

== Participatory Governance ==
Participatory governance is a democratic governance approach, in which citizen participation, and their deliberative empowerment through inclusion and representation is the focus. It is a key pillar of ocean governance introduced to through Article 21 in the 1992 Rio Conference on Environment and Development empowering civil society and acknowledging their role in governance. This supported the Brundtland Commission's Report in which top-down regulations were reported to fail in the scope of marine governance.

Ocean governance is benefited by an integrated governmental approach whereby state and non-state actors like civil society actors work together, incorporating a range of knowledge. Blue civil society, which includes NGOs, philanthropists and communities, are becoming increasingly important in ocean governance and participatory governance due to the power they have in agenda setting and pushing policy narratives particularly concerning themes such as climate change. Policies intended to adapt to the challenges of the oceans often excludes and thereby increases the vulnerability of local communities, fishers, and indigenous groups, often the most influenced in daily life by these policies. The inclusion of local community groups aid in breaking down the economically dominated power dynamic that is prevalent in global ocean governance and challenges the westernised, state dominated approach to global ocean governance.

=== Role of Indigenous Peoples and Local Communities (IPLC) ===
The inclusion of local communities and indigenous knowledge in ocean governance leads to greater and more sustainable ocean governance policies due to greater incorporation of ideas such as generational views of environmental stewardship. Examples include projects in Canada where indigenous knowledge has improved the efficiency of ocean governance and conservation by the application of Haida nation principles to marine land use planning, and in Indonesia where collaboration between local government and indigenous communities has led to community management of marine resources and rehabilitation of the local mangrove environment.

States alone cannot create sustainable ocean governance. Current major ocean governance legislation such as UNCLOS does not fully incorporate or protect the rights of indigenous and local communities and whilst international frameworks such as UNDRIP try to rectify this solution encouraging the Biodiversity Beyond National Jurisdiction agreement, there is no definitive overlap between states and local communities.

=== Integrated Coastal and Ocean Management in Canada (ICOM) ===
In 2002, Canada introduced the Oceans Strategy, which was heavily based on participatory governance principles:

"The governance model proposed for Integrated Management is one of collaboration. It involves ocean management decisions based on shared information, on consultation with stakeholders, and on their advisory or management participation in the planning process. It is also based on institutional arrangements that bring together all stakeholders. Participants take an active part in designing, implementing and monitoring the effectiveness of coastal and ocean management plans, and partners enter into agreements on ocean management plans with specific responsibilities, powers and obligations. It is also recognized that in specific cases, Integrated Management and planning may be achieved through co-management."

==== Case Study: The Eastern Scotian Shelf Integrated Management (ESSIM) Initiative ====
The aim of the ESSIM Initiative is to create integrated and adaptive management plans that are a collaborative effort for ecosystem, social, economic and institutional sustainability of the Eastern Scotian Shelf. It incorporates maintaining existing jurisdictional responsibilities, inclusion, consensus, accountability, dispute resolution, networking, evolution, and learning by doing, which are all part of the governance principles in the Oceans Strategy.

The ESSIM relies on the Stakeholders Roundtable (lead stakeholders and government) and the Planning Office drafting up a management plan which is then reviewed at the ESSIM Forum (an annual stakeholders' meeting), community meetings and the general public. Overall, an agreement then must be reached with the Stakeholder Roundtable and a final plan given to appropriate federal and provincial government agencies, before acquiring final approval under the Oceans Act. It has been seen as fairly successful in improving communication and cooperation within government agencies, but there is room for greater inclusion of coastal community participation to fully fulfill the participatory theory.

== Levels of implementation ==
Ocean governance can be carried out at a local, national, regional or international level. However, there needs to be a link between all levels of implementation for "good" ocean governance to grow from participatory governance at these different levels. However organizations frequently lack authority and instruments to guarantee compliance and enforcement of these laws: Pope Francis observed in his 2015 encyclical letter, Laudato si', that "international and regional conventions do exist, but fragmentation and the lack of strict mechanisms of regulation, control and penalization end up undermining these efforts".

=== Local ===
Community-based management is featured in the Principle 22. This Declaration highlights that states need to recognize the importance that Indigenous and local communities play in sustainable environmental policy making. Also the stakeholders should play a responsible role with the government in a form of co-management to manage ocean resources. The stakeholders should play a responsible role for the government in a form of co-management to manage the ocean as the Community-based management in the Rio Declaration on Environment and Development recognizes the importance of community based play. In addition, the local communities should also be given a role of management for sustainable environmental policy making.

=== National ===
At a national level, ocean governance depends on an integrated management process within one state. Such processes depend on the engagement and cooperation of all government ministries with functions or authority related to ocean sectors. Ocean issues may be low on a political agenda, therefore successful integrated ocean policy requires political leadership and oversight. Because ocean governance depends on the integrated management process within one state, the engagement of all corporations and government ministries should function at a national level with focus directed to the oceans. The issue of ocean development at a national level is currently low on a political agenda as mentioned above, but for there to be a successful integration of ocean policies leading to developments, the oversight in creating new structures and integrations must be sustainable.

=== Regional ===
At this scale, the scope of challenges expands and greater numbers of organizations have jurisdiction. The Regional Seas Programme of UNEP creates programs to be managed and coordinated by countries that share a common body of water. These Action Plans range from chemical waste to conservation of marine ecosystems. These however need to be strengthened along with The Global Programme of Action for the Protection of the Marine Environment from Land-based Activities (GPA).

To be effective Regional Development Banks (RDBs) and Regional Governmental Organizations (RGOs) participate to provide reinforcement to national organizations.

=== International ===
The General Assembly of the United Nations is seen as the leading international body for global ocean governance. It functions with the Secretary General making recommendations through the Consultative Process of ocean matters and the Law of the Sea, which are then annually reviewed by The General Assembly. At this scale, the international body for global ocean governance is responsible for reducing pressure on the oceans and seas and creating the conditions for a sustainable blue economy.

== Examples of marine resource governance ==
=== Fishing ===
Fishing is a vitally important activity, linked to food security. In 2009, 79.9 million tonnes of fish were caught from marine environments. The FAO has stated that over half (53%) of fish stocks are at full exploitation, with current catches close to the maximum sustainable production levels. Therefore, there is a need for improved international and national policies. While approximately 99% of all fishery resources are within national jurisdiction, overexploitation continues.

Since the mid-1980s, numerous fishery organizations emerged but struggle to prevent global overfishing. There are problems with illegal fishing vessels violating fisheries laws, misreporting catches to authorities or fishing outside their proper jurisdiction. Illegal fishing frequently targets certain fish species with a high economic value, for example Bluefin Tuna.

Poor fishery management may be overcome by transitioning to rights-based fishing and self-governance, which incorporates participatory governance approaches. For this approach to work, there needs to be financial incentives that align with sustainability goals. Under such policies, 'shares' are distributed between the shareholders (individual/corporation, community or fishers' collective) that are linked directly to the productivity and value of the resource. Consequently, shareholders appreciate the resource more and overfishing may be reduced. When shareholders have an individual fishery share that they depend on and benefit from, competition may be reduced and sustainability improved.

There is a focus on rights-based approaches in current development programs, which have an emphasis on creating (or recreating) and supporting local institutions for the fishery. While rights may result in economic benefits, there is a possibility of monopolization by larger and powerful shareholders that will squeeze out small-scaled operations. While it may be more equitable for fisher folk to have more rights, they may lack the skills to manage fisheries information, assessment, management and negotiation; and they also lack sufficient funding to carry out these roles.

An alternative approach has been introducing market incentives to encourage sustainable fishing. The Marine Stewardship Council (MSC) introduced such incentives through a fishery certification program, with the incentive that the consumer will buy fish only caught by sustainable fisheries. This in turn creates a cycle that encourages the producer to abide by sustainable practices. To date (December 2011) there are currently 135 certified fisheries in the MSC Program.

=== Plastic Pollution ===
The proliferation of synthetic plastics and polymers continues to cause devastation to marine life. However, regulation can expedite the removal of plastic pollution from the marketplace. Historically, the use of chemicals, such as coolants in refrigerators under The Montreal Protocol, has been successfully reversed by employing rapid environmental policy. Similar policy, such as the Save Our Seas Act, has been used to regulate macroplastics, but now a call to action is needed in regulating microplastic and nanoplastic pollution. While the policy is limited, there are a few examples including the Microbead-Free Waters Act and the Ocean Protection Council: Statewide Microplastics Strategy.

There are even studies that have demonstrated the toxic effects of microplastics on our oceans and marine organisms such as phytoplankton, but many of them did not produce studies using environmentally relevant levels of the pollutant, and no studies have been published assessing the combined toxicity of microplastics and harmful chemicals such as UV filters. In order to accurately predict and manage risk, we need further studies on plastic pollution and harmful chemicals impact on marine life. Priority should be given to large scale, rapid screening of common organic pollutants and realistically weathered micro and nanoplastics to replicate oceanic conditions as closely as is possible in an ecotoxicological assay. Detailed studies aimed at the size and concentration of plastics and other emerging contaminants in the ocean are thus highly valuable to inform risk to coastal communities and the environment once they deposit.

Microplastic prevalence is overwhelmingly documented in the scientific literature yet has been the recipient of limited policy action. However, macroplastic pollution policy has some success in the US and abroad, and we can use similar methodology to incite interest in the implementation of policy directed towards the reduction and prevention of microplastic pollution.

== Non-State Actors Roles in Ocean Governance ==
=== Public Private Partnerships (PPP) and Multi-Level Governance (MLG) ===
The role of corporations and business in ocean governance in the current neoliberal globalised world is continually debated but it is ultimately recognised that corporations play a highly important role in ensuring effective, global responses to ocean-based issues. This is often achieved through what can be referred to as Public Private Partnerships (PPP) or Multi-Level Governance (MLG). MLG's can be defined as "the dispersion of authority to jurisdictions within and beyond national states". This is a particular important concept when analysing the role of corporations in ocean governance. Corporations can, via MLG and PP'S, play "decisive and proactive (i.e. entrepreneurial)" roles in solving wicked policy issues such as climate change. Further, corporations play a "substantial role" in developing effective tools in environmental ocean governance and policy due to their adaptability, social and market power as well as their political power. In a neoliberal globalised world corporations have the ability to transcend national borders and international institutions to offer effective solutions to global problems.

Corporations are agile entities with exponential reach and growth, who – it can be argued - have a great responsibility toward issues that society faces, most crucially climate change. This responsibility is referred to under the term Corporate Social Responsibility and plays a crucial role in legitimising corporate governance. CSR, whether democratically legitimate or not, manifests as forms of MLGs, PPPs and integrated governance. These integrated ocean governance partnerships are ultimately crucial in bridging the gap between top-down and bottom-up leadership and responsibility in ocean governance. Bridging this gap and creating fully integrated governance is essential in order to ensure effective, well-rounded and by in large successful solutions to the issue of ocean.

==== Case study: 'The France-Mer 2030' Plan ====
A contemporary example of such a partnership is the 'France-Mer 2030' plan. The plan is an ambitious collaboration between the French secretary of state for Maritime Affairs, Hevré Beville, and the private actors from the French shipping industry. The plan outlines an acceleration of the "decarbonisation of the French shipping industry". The French government has allocated 300 million euros over 5 years to boost the transition. This is in collaboration with French shipping giants CMA CGM who have provided 200 million euros in support of the government's plan to decarbonise the shipping industry. CEO of CMA CGM Rodolphe Saadé outlined the importance of such public-Private Partnerships in ocean governance stating, "This ambition [addressing environmental issues in the ocean] will only succeed if it is a collective adventure bringing together the State, local authorities and the private sector, from fishermen to large-scale distribution". This is a clear demonstration of the understanding - from both the public and private sector - of the importance of Public-Private Partnerships in effective and successful ocean governance. Although results are yet to be determined the 'France-Mer 2030' plan is a prime example of the potential of collaboration between the public and private sector in creating effective, efficient, sustainable ocean governance.

== Sustainable development goal 14 and ocean health ==
The 17 Sustainable development goals (SDGs) are an elaboration and expansion of the Millennium Development Goals (MDGs). The SDGs and Sustainable Development Goal 14 in particular, call to action a broad range of actors, from states to businesses and NGOs. The sustainable developments goals have been described as holistic, since they cover economic development, social inclusion and environmental sustainability.

The UN General Assembly's 'Our ocean, our future: call for action in 2017' emphasized that SDG 14 is interlinked to the other SDG's by stipulating that the approach to implement SDG 14 should be "in an integrated and coordinated way and promote policies and actions that take into account the critical interlinkages among the targets of Goal 14, the potential synergies between Goal 14 and the other Goals".

According to Christian Bueger and Felix Mallin, ocean health was an important concept in the formulations of SDG 14 and were among the key issues of two recent UN Ocean Conferences. The UN describes SDG 14 as focusing on conserving and sustainably using the oceans, seas and marine resources. The targets include reducing marine pollution, protecting and restoring ecosystems, reducing ocean acidification, regulating fishing and end overfishing and IUU-fishing and expanding marine protected areas, with varying timelines.

According to several scholars, ocean health and SDG 14 together reflect the growing international attention to sustainable ocean management. The paradigm of ocean health and SDG 14 has significant overlaps: both aim to conserve and sustainably use the oceans, seas, and living as well as nonliving marine resources and emphasize the use of scientific measurements to determine their goals. SDG 14 is embedded in UNCLOS, which is shown in Target 14.c, of SDG 14, which calls for the enhancement of ocean conservation and sustainable use through the implementation of international law as reflected in UNCLOS, which provides the legal foundation for such efforts.

== Implementation ==
Four of the ten targets in SDG 14 expired in 2020. The targets were target 14.2 (protecting and restoring ecosystems), 14.4 (sustainable fishing), 14.5 (MPA coverage) and 14.6 (Combat IUU-fishing). A study from 2022 has shown the level of implementation in these activities.

For target 14.2 the study shows that more than half of all countries are making low progress. In target 14.4 they show that more than sixty percent of countries are making low progress. As for target 14.5 the study shows that this is the most achieved target with around 18 percent of countries having achieved it, while at the same time being the target where most countries were classified as having far from achieved. Finally, target 14.6 is the target where most countries have scored 'good progress' at around 40 percent, with a cumulative score of around 45 percent in 'low progress' and 'far from achievement'.

The study indicates that achievement is strongly skewed towards developed countries and only Belgium and Germany have achieved three of the four targets. They link the level of achievement to factors such as government capacity and technical knowledge.

== Challenges ==
Several authors have observed that SDG 14 and ocean health more broadly are difficult to implement. They have noted that SDG 14 is one of the most difficult goals to achieve and is among the most under implemented of the goals. Karen Scott has argued that the implementation of SDG 14 and ocean health is often considered constrained by the structural limitation of UNCLOS and the law of the sea more generally. Other scholars have identified the disparity between international legal regimes addressing different sources of pressure on the marine environment, including pollution, resource exploitation, and habitat degradation.

=== Funding ===
Out of all the sustainable development goals, SDG 14 is the least funded and receives less than 1 percent of all the total SDG related funding. These financial limits have been identified as a factor constraining the implementation of sustainable ocean governance, especially for goals requiring technological investment or monitoring.

=== Fragmented structure ===
Contemporary ocean governance has been described as fragmented with overlapping mandates and sectoral and zonal division. The zonal aspect refers to who has the mandate or authority to regulate and enforce rules based on demarcated boundaries. The sectoral aspect covers which activity is sought to be regulated.

Scholars focusing on ocean health and SDG 14 have identified fragmentation as a factor influencing policy coherence and implementation of sustainable ocean policies.

Governance of ocean areas, both inside and outside national jurisdiction, is primarily sectoral. This means that fisheries agencies are regulating fisheries catches, different agencies undertake regulation with pollution prevention and other specialized agencies regulate gas and oil extraction, with minimal coordination in issues that affect several sectors at the same time.

The fragmented nature of ocean governance is illustrated by the coexistence of different sectoral and zonal mandates. Ocean governance scholars have observed this. They view the ocean as interconnected, where marine environmental protection and the management of ocean-based activities have operated independently without considering the cumulative impacts on the marine environment.

For example, pollution from ships or deep-sea mining can damage fish habitats or coral reefs, but the RFMO or national fishing regulations do not account for ship pollution or mining and vice-versa. Related to SDG 14, regional seas conventions are said to play an important role in implementing target 14.1, 14.2 and 14.5. Whereas RFMO is said to lead efforts related to target 14.4. It has been observed that area-based management can impact fishing activities, and fishing activities can impact the state of the marine ecosystems. Scholars also observe that the regime of international fisheries law is currently not rooted in sustainability, and it does not take into consideration the impact of fishing activities on the wider marine environment. Each organization may fulfill its legal mandate, but the ocean is interconnected and the combined impact of multiple sectors may exceed the ecosystem's capacity to recover. Similarly, fishing and mining activities in one area can have cumulative impacts on surrounding marine environments, potentially limiting the ability of other states or actors to sustainably use and enjoy marine resources.

==== Governing the commons ====
Areas beyond national jurisdiction, which include the high seas and the international seabed area (the Area), cover over two-thirds of the ocean and is often referred to as a global commons. According to Katherine Houghton, the structure of the law of the sea (Including UNCLOS but not excluding other legally binding documents or soft law), means that action or policy making in the areas beyond national jurisdiction relies on collective action, but there are few institutional mechanisms in place that can engage in active management at this scale and these are largely sectoral. Scholar such as Chris Armstrong, Pradeep A. Singh, Mara Ort and Leticia Carvalho, who is Head of the Marine and Freshwater Branch of the United Nations Environment Programme have observed that high seas governance does contain bodies that regulate different activities, but to date there has been limited coherence and coordination between them.

It has been noted by UN published papers and scholars as Catherine Blanchard and Al-Abdulrazzak and colleagues that environmental protection and ocean health are particularly challenged in areas beyond national jurisdiction. A term scholars and experts often use is tragedy of the commons, because it describes how common pool resources are exploited in the absence of ownership, monitoring, coordination and sanctioning. Scholars explain that while cooperative efforts to protect ocean health generate long-term collective benefits, individual states or companies may derive greater short-term gains from overexploitation. As such, this means that activities in the high seas are particularly vulnerable to free riding, which may lead to under-provision of conservation measures.

== See also ==
- Earth system governance
- The United Nations Ocean Conference
- Ocean colonization
- Ocean Development
- Sustainable Development Goal 14
- United Nations Convention on the Law of the Sea
