= United Nations Ocean Conference =

Series of international summits

- Frequency: Triannual
- Location: Varies
- Years active: 9
- Inaugurated: 2017
- Previous event: 2025
- Next event: 2028
- Participants: Member states of the United Nations; financial, educational, and scientific institutions; intergovernmental organizations, Indigenous representatives
- Website: www.un.org

The United Nations Ocean Conference (officially the United Nations Conference to Support the Implementation of Sustainable Development Goal 14, abbreviated UNOC) is a recurring conference held by the United Nations to support the implementation of Sustainable Development Goal 14. The conference was inaugurated in 2017 in New York City, and since 2022, has been held once every three years. Each conference is jointly organized and hosted by an elected team consisting of one developed nation and one developing nation.

== Background ==
The Earth's waters are said to be "under threat as never before", with pollution, overfishing, and the effects of climate change severely damaging the health of our oceans. For instance as oceans are warming and becoming more acidic, biodiversity is becoming reduced and changing currents will cause more frequent storms and droughts. Every year around 8 million metric tons of plastic waste leak into the ocean and make it into the circular ocean currents. This causes contamination of sediments at the sea-bottom and causes plastic waste to be embedded in the aquatic food chain. It could lead to oceans containing more plastics than fish by 2050 if nothing is done. Key habitats such as coral reefs are at risk and noise pollution are a threat to whales, dolphins, and other species. Furthermore almost 90 percent of fish stocks are overfished or fully exploited which cost more than $80 billion a year in lost revenues.

UN Secretary-General António Guterres stated that decisive, coordinated global action can solve the problems created by humanity. Peter Thomson, President of the UN General Assembly, highlighted the conference's significance, saying "if we want a secure future for our species on this planet, we have to act now on the health of the ocean and on climate change".

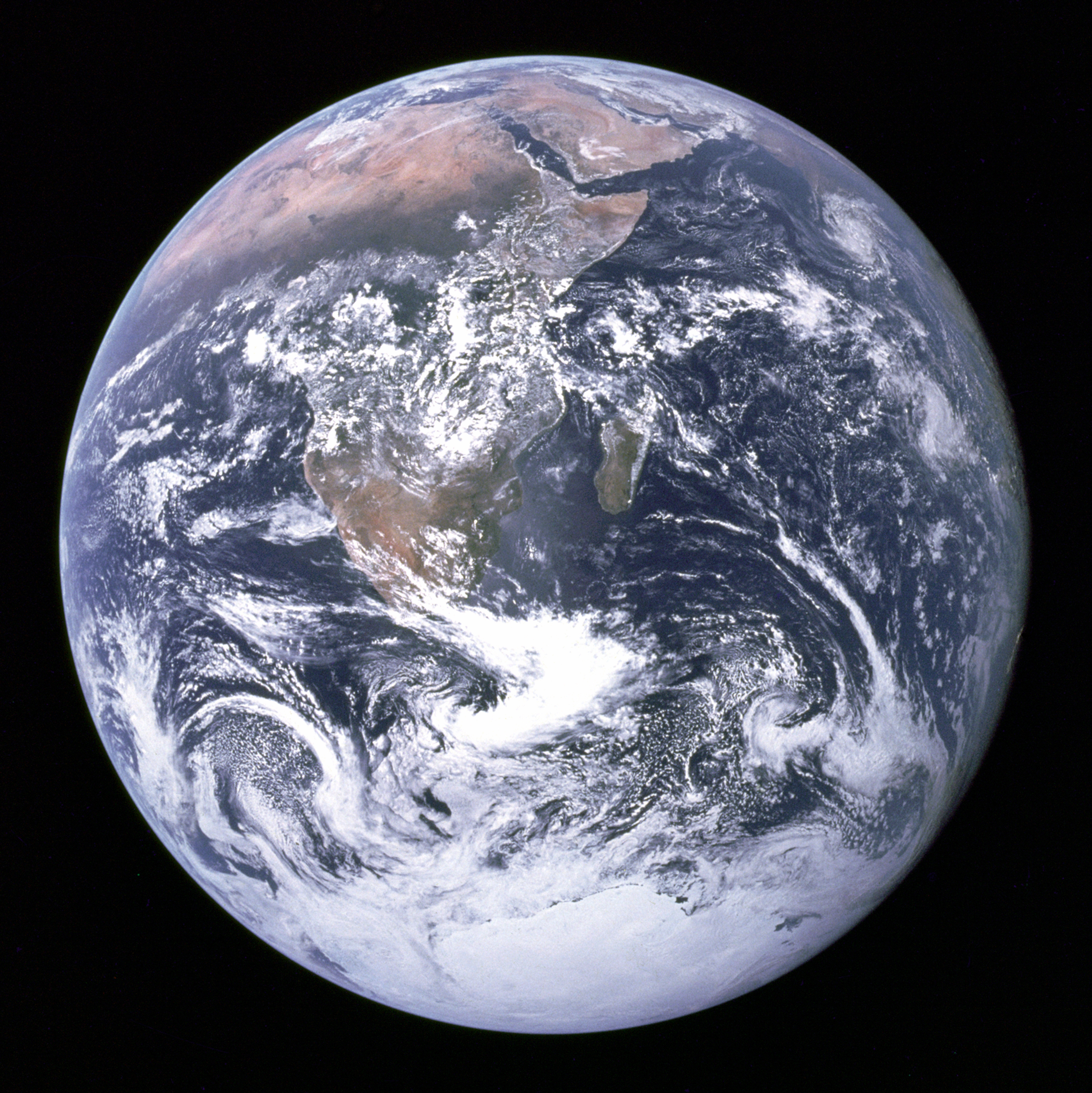
Earth is often called the "blue planet" as oceans cover over 70 percent of the planet, giving it a markedly blue appearance when seen from space (here photographed by Apollo 17 in 1972).

The United Nations' Sustainable Development Goals (SDGs) lay out the organization's ambitions for sustainable growth and improvement by 2030. The mission statement of SDG 14 is "Conserve and sustainably use the oceans, seas and marine resources for sustainable development." The Ocean Conferences serve as a platform for governments and non-governmental organizations to support this goal and work together towards its implementation.

The first Ocean Conference was held at the United Nations Headquarters in New York City in 2017, and jointly organized by Sweden and Fiji. Subsequent conferences have taken place every three years, and been co-hosted by one developed country and one developing country.

== Chronology ==
Year	Location	Host countries	Dates	Notes
2017	New York City (UN Headquarters)	Fiji; Sweden	5-9 June	Inaugural event
2022	Lisbon	Portugal; Kenya	27 June-1 July	5 years between New York and Lisbon conferences, compared to the usual three.
2025	Nice	France; Costa Rica	9-13 June	
2028	Busan	South Korea; Chile	TBA (June)	
