= Marine resources =

Resources that are found in oceans and are useful for humans

Marine resources are resources (physical and biological entities) that are found in oceans and are useful for humans. The term was popularized through Sustainable Development Goal 14 which is about "Life below water" and is one of the 17 Sustainable Development Goals established by the United Nations in 2015. The official wording of the goal is to "Conserve and sustainably use the oceans, seas and marine resources for sustainable development".

Marine resources include:

- biological diversity (marine biodiversity)
- ecosystem services from marine ecosystems, such as marine coastal ecosystems and coral reefs
- fish and seafood
- minerals (for example deep sea mining)
- oil and gas
- renewable energy resources, such as marine energy
- sand and gravel
- tourism potential

== Global goals ==
The text of Target 14.7 of Sustainable Development Goal 14 states: "By 2030, increase the economic benefits to small island developing states and least developed countries from the sustainable use of marine resources, including through sustainable management of fisheries, aquaculture and tourism".

Fisheries and aquaculture can contribute to alleviating poverty, hunger, malnutrition and economic growth. The contribution of sustainable fisheries to the global GDP was around 0.1% per year.

== See also ==
- Effects of climate change on oceans
- Human impact on marine life
- Marine conservation
