= Sustainability and environmental management =

Managing nature and resources according to sustainability principles

At the global scale sustainability and environmental management involves managing the oceans, freshwater systems, land and atmosphere, according to sustainability principles.

Land use change is fundamental to the operations of the biosphere because alterations in the relative proportions of land dedicated to urbanisation, agriculture, forest, woodland, grassland and pasture have a marked effect on the global water, carbon and nitrogen biogeochemical cycles. Management of the Earth's atmosphere involves assessment of all aspects of the carbon cycle to identify opportunities to address human-induced climate change and this has become a major focus of scientific research because of the potential catastrophic effects on biodiversity and human communities. Ocean circulation patterns have a strong influence on climate and weather and, in turn, the food supply of both humans and other organisms.

== Atmosphere ==
In March 2009, at a meeting of the Copenhagen Climate Council, 2,500 climate experts from 80 countries issued a keynote statement that there is now "no excuse" for failing to act on global warming and without strong carbon reduction targets "abrupt or irreversible" shifts in climate may occur that "will be very difficult for contemporary societies to cope with". Management of the global atmosphere now involves assessment of all aspects of the carbon cycle to identify opportunities to address human-induced climate change and this has become a major focus of scientific research because of the potential catastrophic effects on biodiversity and human communities.

Other human impacts on the atmosphere include the air pollution in cities, the pollutants including toxic chemicals like nitrogen oxides, sulphur oxides, volatile organic compounds and airborne particulate matter that produce photochemical smog and acid rain, and the chlorofluorocarbons that degrade the ozone layer. Anthropogenic particulates such as sulfate aerosols in the atmosphere reduce the direct irradiance and reflectance (albedo) of the Earth's surface. Known as global dimming the decrease is estimated to have been about 4% between 1960 and 1990 although the trend has subsequently reversed. Global dimming may have disturbed the global water cycle by reducing evaporation and rainfall in some areas. It also creates a cooling effect and this may have partially masked the effect of greenhouse gases on global warming.

== Oceans ==
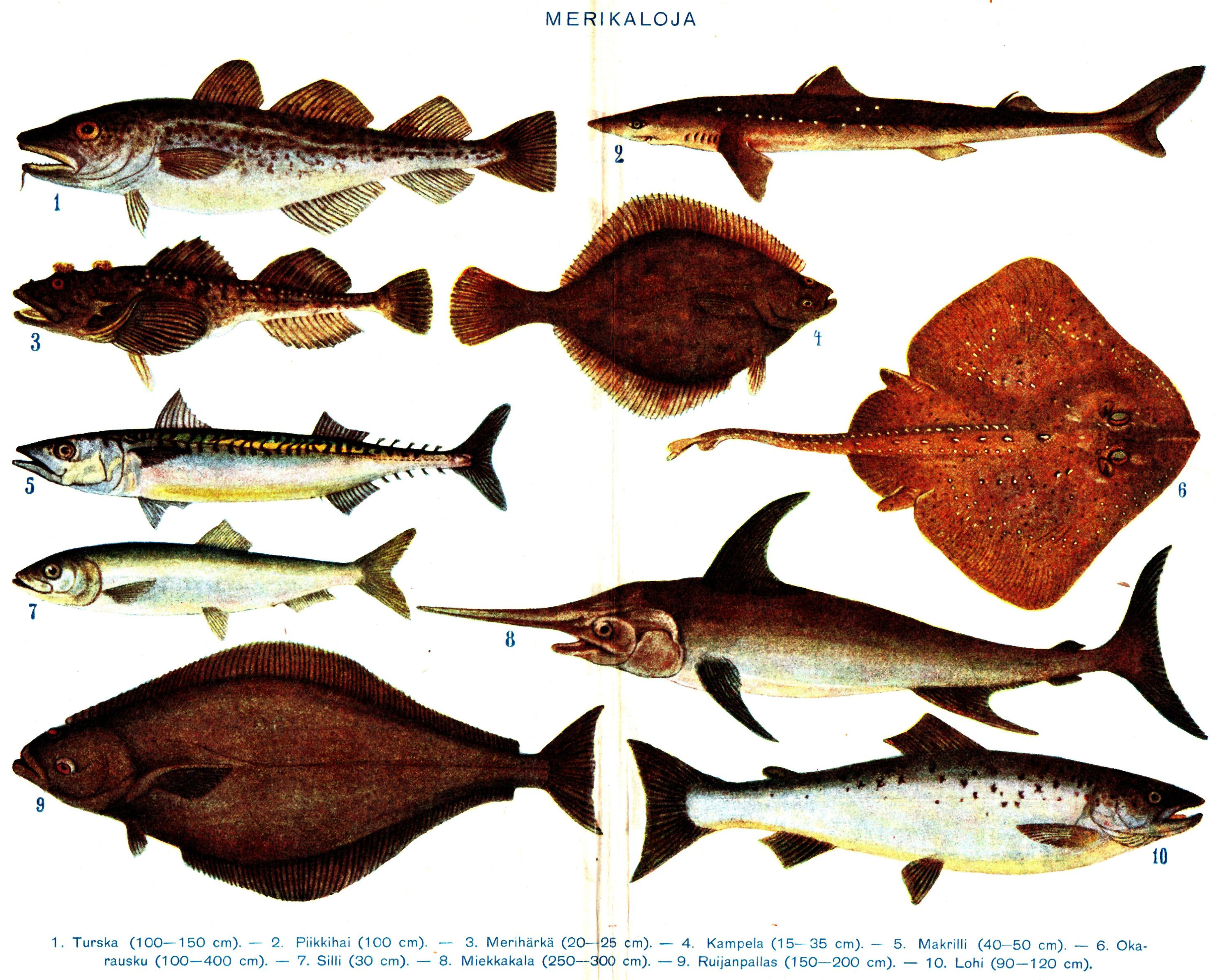
A selection of the world's saltwater fish

Ocean circulation patterns have a strong influence on climate and weather and, in turn, the food supply of both humans and other organisms. Scientists have warned of the possibility, under the influence of climate change, of a sudden alteration in circulation patterns of ocean currents that could drastically alter the climate in some regions of the globe. Major human environmental impacts occur in the more habitable regions of the ocean fringes – the estuaries, coastline and bays. Eight point five of the world's population – about 600 million people – live in low-lying areas vulnerable to sea level rise. Recent satellite data shows that global sea levels grew by 0.59 cm in 2024, contributing to an overall rise of 10.5 cm over the past 31 years. Trends of concern that require management include: over-fishing (beyond sustainable levels); coral bleaching due to ocean warming, and ocean acidification due to increasing levels of dissolved carbon dioxide; and sea level rise due to climate change. Because of their vastness oceans also act as a convenient dumping ground for human waste. Remedial strategies include: more careful waste management, statutory control of overfishing by adoption of sustainable fishing practices and the use of environmentally sensitive and sustainable aquaculture and fish farming, reduction of fossil fuel emissions and restoration of coastal and other marine habitats.

== Freshwater ==
Water covers 71% of the Earth's surface. Of this, 97.5% is the salty water of the oceans and only 2.5% freshwater, most of which is locked up in the Antarctic ice sheet. The remaining freshwater is found in lakes, rivers, wetlands, the soil, aquifers and atmosphere. All life depends on the solar-powered global water cycle, the evaporation from oceans and land to form water vapour that later condenses from clouds as rain, which then becomes the renewable part of the freshwater supply. Awareness of the global importance of preserving water for ecosystem services has only recently emerged as: during the 20th century, more than half the world's wetlands have been lost along with their valuable environmental services. Biodiversity-rich freshwater ecosystems are currently declining faster than marine or land ecosystems making them the world's most vulnerable habitats. Increasing urbanization pollutes clean water supplies and much of the world still does not have access to clean, safe water. In the industrial world demand management has slowed absolute usage rates but increasingly water is being transported over vast distances from water-rich natural areas to population-dense urban areas and energy-hungry desalination is becoming more widely used. Greater emphasis is now being placed on the improved management of blue (harvestable) and green (soil water available for plant use) water, and this applies at all scales of water management.

== Land ==
Loss of biodiversity originates largely from the habitat loss and fragmentation produced by artificial land development, forestry and agriculture as natural capital is progressively converted to man-made capital. Land-use change is fundamental to the operations of the biosphere because alterations in the relative proportions of land dedicated to urbanisation, agriculture, forest, woodland, grassland and pasture have a marked effect on the global water, carbon and nitrogen biogeochemical cycles and this can negatively impact both natural and human systems. At the local human scale major sustainability benefits accrue from the pursuit of green cities and sustainable parks and gardens.

== Forests ==
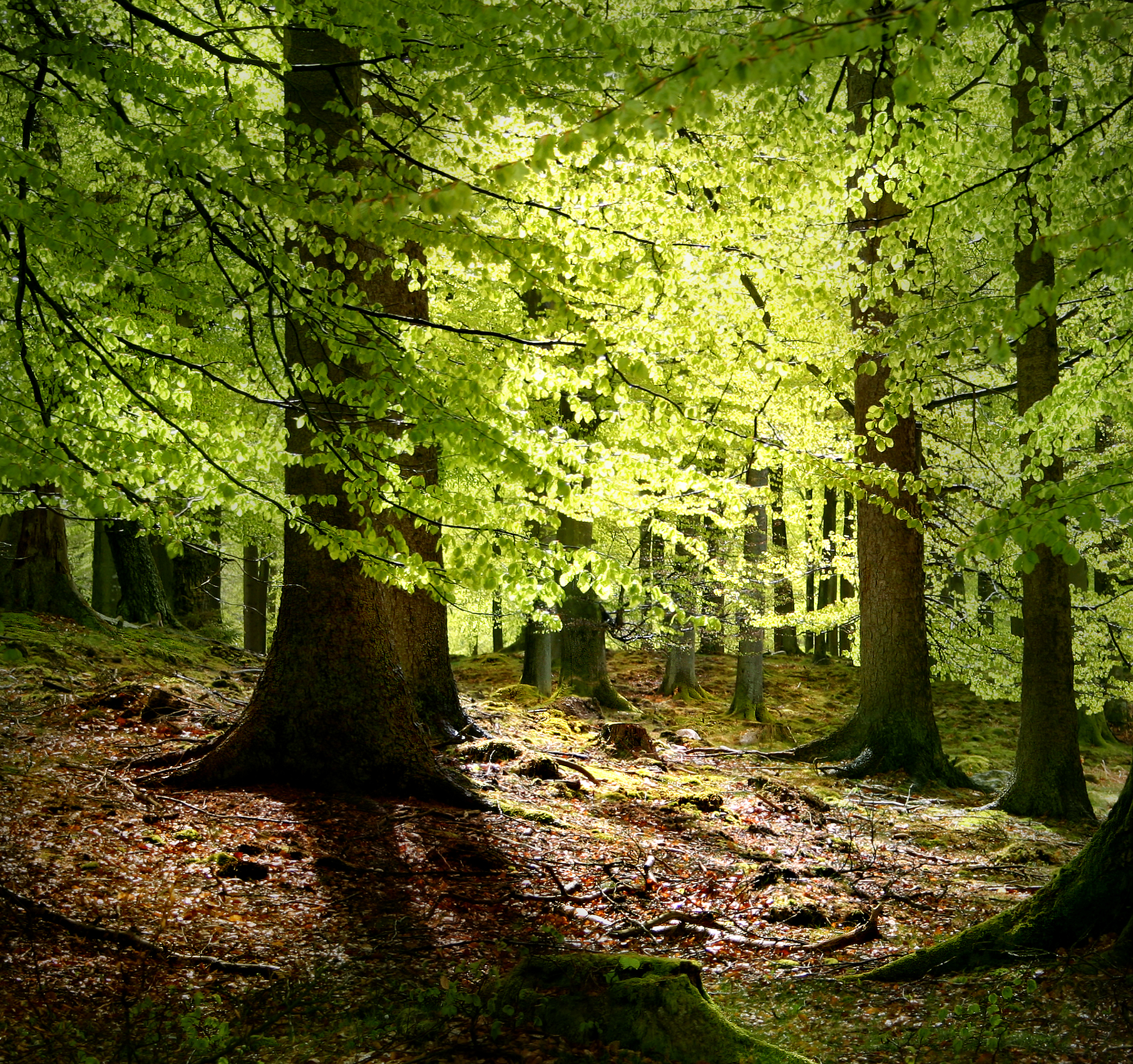
Beech forest – Grib Skov, Denmark

Since the Neolithic Revolution, human consumption has reduced the world's forest cover by about 47%. Present-day forests occupy about a quarter of the world's ice-free land with about half of these occurring in the tropics. In temperate and boreal regions forest area is gradually increasing (with the exception of Siberia), but deforestation in the tropics is of major concern.

Forests moderate the local climate and the global water cycle through their light reflectance (albedo) and evapotranspiration. They also conserve biodiversity, protect water quality, preserve soil and soil quality, provide fuel and pharmaceuticals, and purify the air. These free ecosystem services are not given a market value under most current economic systems, and so forest conservation has little appeal when compared with the economic benefits of logging and clearance which, through soil degradation and organic decomposition returns carbon dioxide to the atmosphere. The United Nations Food and Agriculture Organization (FAO) estimates that about 90% of the carbon stored in land vegetation is locked up in trees and that they sequester about 50% more carbon than is present in the atmosphere. Changes in land use currently contribute about 20% of total global carbon emissions (heavily logged Indonesia and Brazil are a major source of emissions). Climate change can be mitigated by sequestering carbon in reafforestation schemes, plantations and timber products. Also wood biomass can be utilized as a renewable carbon-neutral fuel. The FAO has suggested that, over the period 2005–2050, effective use of tree planting could absorb about 10–20% of man-made emissions – so monitoring the condition of the world's forests must be part of a global strategy to mitigate emissions and protect ecosystem services. However, climate change may preempt this FAO scenario as a study by the International Union of Forest Research Organizations in 2009 concluded that the stress of a 2.5 °C (36.5 °F) temperature rise above pre-industrial levels could result in the release of vast amounts of carbon so the potential of forests to act as carbon "sinks" is "at risk of being lost entirely".

== Cultivated land ==
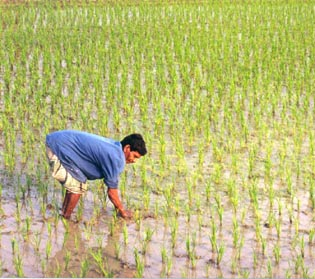
A rice paddy. Rice, wheat, corn and potatoes make up more than half the world's food supply

Feeding more than seven billion human bodies takes a heavy toll on the Earth's resources. This begins with the appropriation of about 38% of the Earth's land surface and about 20% of its net primary productivity. Added to this are the resource-hungry activities of industrial agribusiness – everything from the crop need for irrigation water, synthetic fertilizers and pesticides to the resource costs of food packaging, transport (now a major part of global trade) and retail. Food is essential to life. But the list of environmental costs of food production is a long one: topsoil depletion, erosion and conversion to desert from constant tillage of annual crops; overgrazing; salinization; sodification; waterlogging; high levels of fossil fuel use; reliance on inorganic fertilisers and synthetic organic pesticides; reductions in genetic diversity by the mass use of monocultures; water resource depletion; pollution of waterbodies by run-off and groundwater contamination; social problems including the decline of family farms and weakening of rural communities.

All of these environmental problems associated with industrial agriculture and agribusiness are now being addressed through such movements as sustainable agriculture, organic farming and more sustainable business practices.

== Extinctions ==
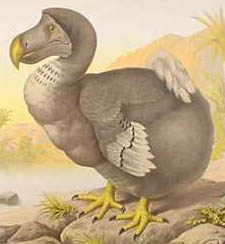
The extinct dodo (Raphus cucullatus)

Although biodiversity loss can be monitored simply as loss of species, effective conservation demands the protection of species within their natural habitats and ecosystems. Following human migration and population growth, the rate of species extinctions has increased to a level that suggests a possible sixth-extinction. Known as the Holocene extinction event this current human-induced extinction of species ranks as one of the world's six mass extinction events. Some scientific estimates indicate that up to half of presently existing species may become extinct by 2100. Current extinction rates are 100 to 1000 times their prehuman levels with more than 10% birds and mammals threatened, about 8% of plants, 5% of fish and more than 20% of freshwater species.

The 2008 IUCN Red List warns that long-term droughts and extreme weather put additional stress on key habitats and, for example, lists 1,226 bird species as threatened with extinction, which is one eighth of all bird species. The Red List Index also identifies 44 tree species in Central Asia as under threat of extinction due to over-exploitation and human development and threatening the region's forests which are home to more than 300 wild ancestors of modern domesticated fruit and nut cultivars.

== Biological invasions ==
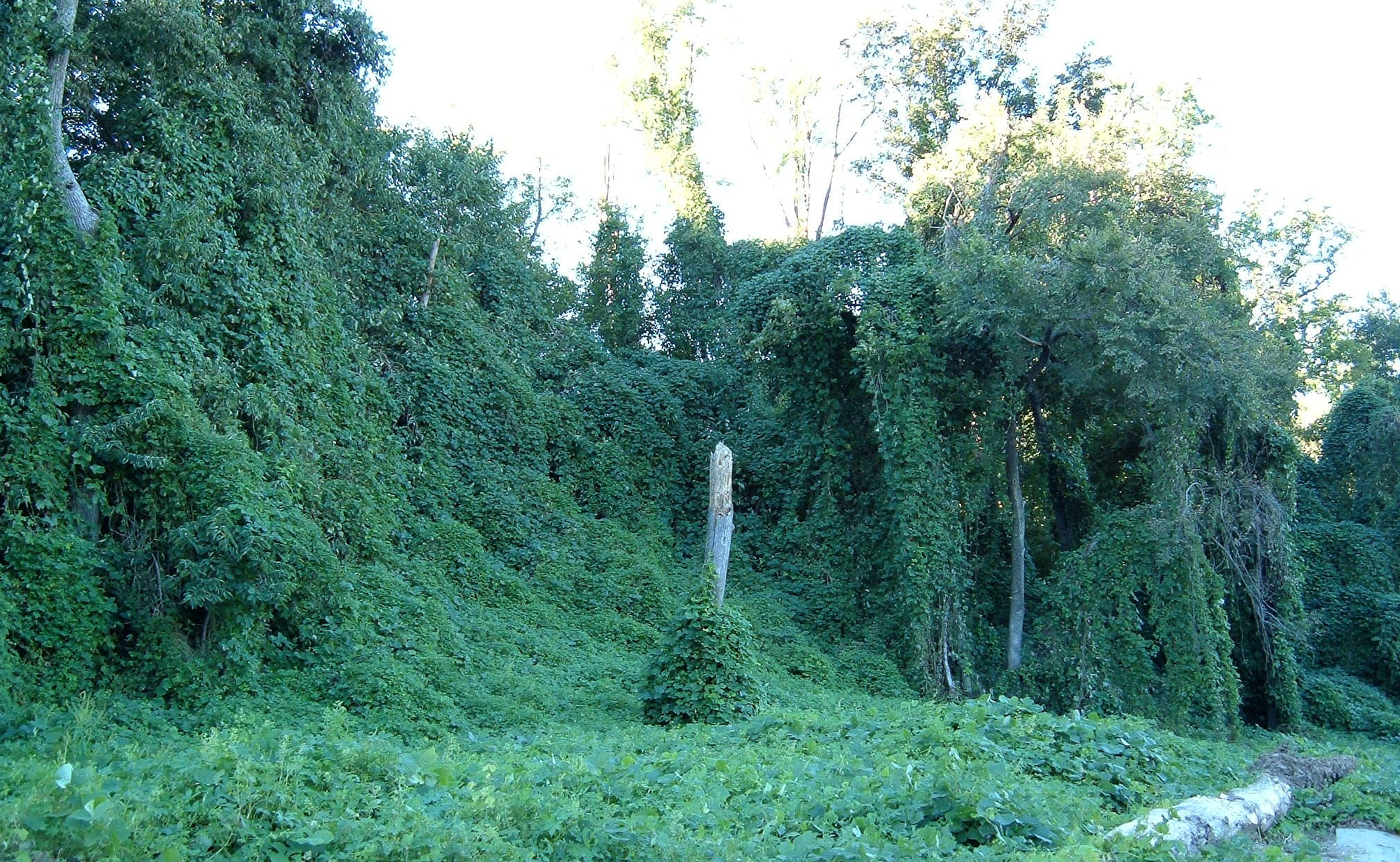
Kudzu (Pueraria lobata) infesting trees in Atlanta, Georgia, USA

In many parts of the industrial world land clearing for agriculture has diminished and here the greatest threat to biodiversity, after climate change, has become the destructive effect of invasive species. Increasingly efficient global transport has facilitated the spread of organisms across the planet. The potential danger of this aspect of globalization is starkly illustrated through the spread of human diseases like HIV AIDS, mad cow disease, bird flu and swine flu, but invasive plants and animals are also having a devastating impact on native biodiversity. Non-indigenous organisms can quickly occupy disturbed land and natural areas where, in the absence of their natural predators, they are able to thrive. At the global scale this issue is being addressed through the Global Invasive Species Information Network but there is improved international biosecurity legislation to minimise the transmission of pathogens and invasive organisms. Also, through CITES legislation there is control the trade in rare and threatened species. Increasingly at the local level public awareness programs are alerting communities, gardeners, the nursery industry, collectors, and the pet and aquarium industries, to the harmful effects of potentially invasive species.

== Resistance to change ==
The environmental sustainability problem has proven difficult to solve. The modern environmental movement has attempted to solve the problem in a large variety of ways. But little progress has been made, as shown by severe ecological footprint overshoot and lack of sufficient progress on the climate change problem. Something within the human system in preventing change to a sustainable mode of behavior. That system trait is systemic change resistance. Change resistance is also known as organizational resistance, barriers to change, or policy resistance.

== See also ==
- Environmental management
- Integrated landscape management
- Natural resource management
- Planetary management

== Sources ==
- Blood, K. (2001). Environmental Weeds. Mt Waverley, Victoria: C.H. Jerram & Associates. ISBN 0-9579086-0-1. An example of a local guide to invasive plants.
- Clarke, R. & King, J. (2006). The Atlas of Water. London: Earthscan. ISBN 978-1-84407-133-3.
- Groombridge, B. & Jenkins, M.D. (2002). World Atlas of Biodiversity. Berkeley: University of California Press. ISBN 978-0-520-23668-4.
- Krebs, C.J. (2001). Ecology: the Experimental Analysis of Distribution and Abundance. Sydney: Benjamin Cummings. ISBN 0-321-04289-1.
- Leakey, R. & Lewin, R. (1995). The Sixth Extinction: Patterns of Life and the Future of Humankind. New York: Bantam Dell Publishing Group. ISBN 0-385-46809-1
- Lindenmayer, D. & Burgman, M. (2005). Practical Conservation Biology. Collingwood, Victoria: CSIRO Publishing. ISBN 0-643-09089-4.
- E, Huttmanová. The Possibilities of Sustainable Development Evaluation in the European Union Area. European Journal of Sustainable Development ISSN 2239-5938.
- Randall, R. (2002). A Global Compendium of Weeds. Meredith, Victoria, Australia: R.G. & F.J. Richardson. ISBN 978-0-9587439-8-3.
- Tudge, C. (2004). So Shall We Reap. London: Penguin Books. ISBN 0-14-100950-0.
- Wilson, E.O. (2002). The Future of Life. New York: Knopf. ISBN 0-679-45078-5.
