= Marine technology =

Technologies used in marine environments

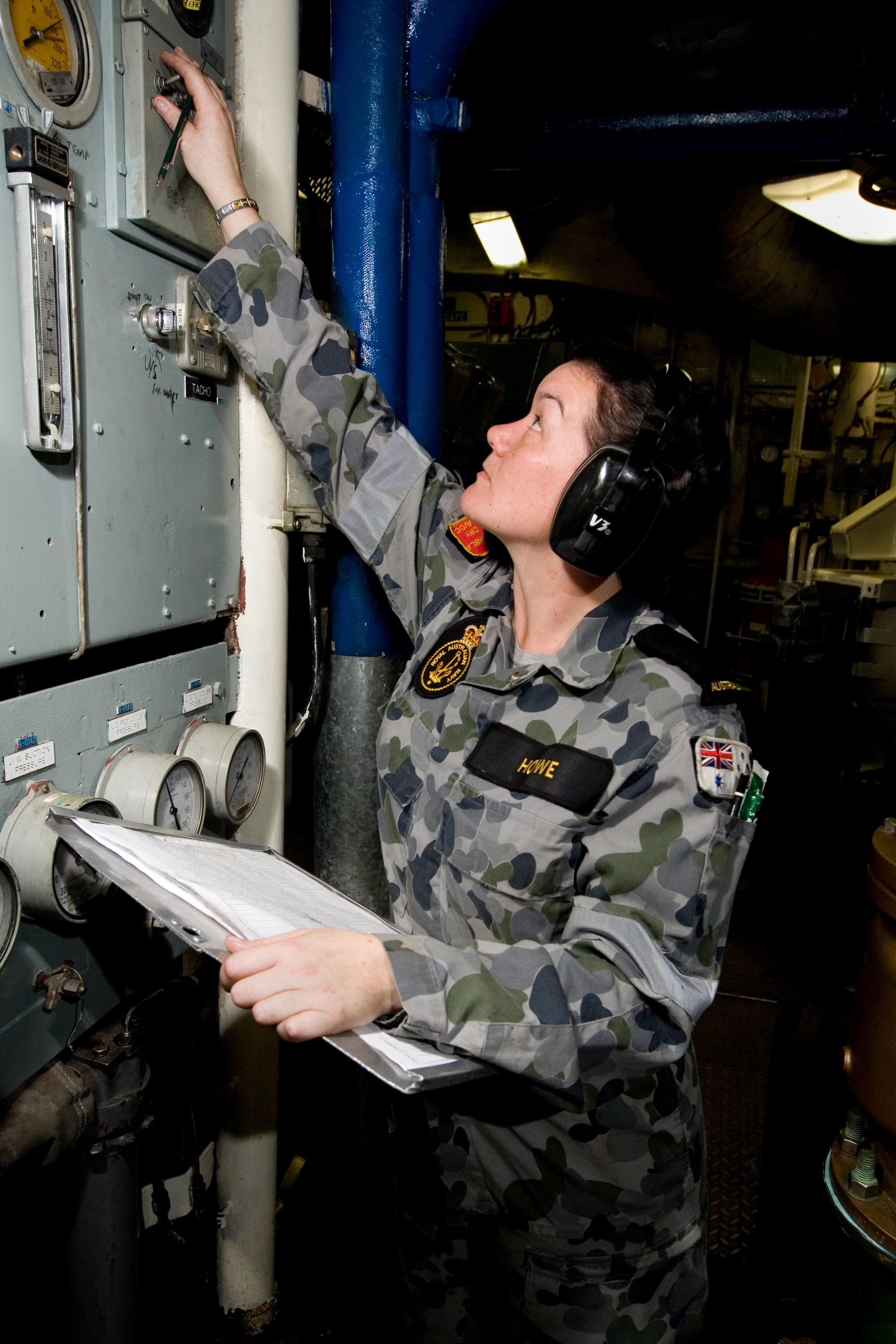
A Royal Australian Navy marine technician from Moora, Australia taking pressure readings on a diesel generator in an enclosed operating station.

Marine technology is defined by WEGEMT (a European association of 40 universities in 17 countries) as "technologies for the safe use, exploitation, protection of, and intervention in, the marine environment." In this regard, according to WEGEMT, the technologies involved in marine technology are the following: naval architecture, marine engineering, ship design, ship building and ship operations; oil and gas exploration, exploitation, and production; hydrodynamics, navigation, sea surface and sub-surface support, underwater technology and engineering; marine resources (including both renewable and non-renewable marine resources); transport logistics and economics; inland, coastal, short sea and deep sea shipping; protection of the marine environment; leisure and safety.

== Education and training ==
According to the Cape Fear Community College of Wilmington, North Carolina, the curriculum for a marine technology program provides practical skills and academic background that are essential in succeeding in the area of marine scientific support. Through a marine technology program, students aspiring to become marine technologists will become proficient in the knowledge and skills required of scientific support technicians.

The educational preparation includes classroom instructions and practical training aboard ships, such as how to use and maintain electronic navigation devices, physical and chemical measuring instruments, sampling devices, and data acquisition and reduction systems aboard ocean-going and smaller vessels, among other advanced equipment.

As far as marine technician programs are concerned, students learn hands-on to trouble shoot, service and repair four- and two-stroke outboards, stern drive, rigging, fuel & lube systems, electrical including diesel engines.

== Relationship to commerce ==
Marine technology is related to the marine science and technology industry, also known as maritime commerce. The Executive Office of Housing and Economic Development (EOHED) of the government of Massachusetts in the United States defined marine science and technology industry as any business that deals primarily with or relates to the sea. A marine science industry includes businesses and technologies, research facilities, and higher education learning institutions. Companies and businesses involved in marine science and industry produce products such as ropes used for commercial fishing, undersea robotics, and stabilized sensor systems. The marine science industry has five sub-sectors, namely marine instrumentation and equipment, marine services, marine research and education, marine materials and supply, and shipbuilding and design.

== Society and culture ==
=== Global goals ===
Marine technology is important for commerce and sustainable development. Therefore, the United Nations Sustainable Development Goal 14 calls for an increase in transfer of marine technology and research capacity to least developed countries (LDCs).

== See also ==
- Marine conservation § Technology and halfway technology
