= United Nations-Oceans =

United Nations organization

- Abbreviation: UN-Oceans
- Formation: September 2003
- Type: Coordination mechanism
- Legal status: Active
- Head: UN-Oceans focal point: The United Nations Legal Counsel/Division for Ocean Affairs and the Law of the Sea, Office of Legal Affairs
- Parent organization: United Nations
- Website: www.unoceans.org

UN-Oceans is an inter-agency mechanism that seeks to enhance the coordination, coherence and effectiveness of competent organizations of the United Nations system and the International Seabed Authority, within existing resources, in conformity with the United Nations Convention on the Law of the Sea, the respective competences of each of its participating organizations and the mandates and priorities approved by their respective governing bodies.

UN-Oceans is to:

(a) Strengthen and promote coordination and coherence of United Nations system activities related to ocean and coastal areas;

(b) Regularly share ongoing and planned activities of participating organizations within the framework of relevant United Nations and other mandates with a view to identifying possible areas for collaboration and synergy;

(c) Facilitate, as appropriate, inputs by its participating organizations to the annual reports of the Secretary-General on oceans and the law of the sea and on sustainable fisheries to be submitted to the Secretariat;

(d) Facilitate inter-agency information exchange, including sharing of experiences, best practices, tools and methodologies and lessons learned in ocean-related matters.

The United Nations Legal Counsel/Division for Ocean Affairs and the Law of the Sea is the focal point of UN-Oceans.

== History ==
Following the Earth Summit in Rio de Janeiro on June 13, 1992, 178 United Nations member states came to a consensus on Agenda 21, an action plan designed to promote sustainable living in the 21st century. As a pivotal part of this sustainability initiative, various United Nations agencies responsible for ocean and coastal affairs formed the Sub-Committee on Oceans and Coastal Issues (SOCA) under the Administrative Committee on Coordination (ACC). This formation aligns with Chapter 17 of Agenda 21, which centers on safeguarding Earth's oceans and responsibly managing their resources in the 21st century.

In 2001, the ACC (now known as the United Nations System Chief Executive Board) conducted a comprehensive review of its subsidiary committees, including SOCA, and declared that these committees should be dissolved by the end of 2001. Instead, they recommended that task-oriented arrangements, especially those concerning the world's oceans, and any inter-agency support requirements should be overseen by a designated lead agency. After extensive discussions among UN programs, agencies, and organizations responsible for coordinating oceanic and coastal matters, it became evident that there was a need for a new inter-agency coordination mechanism. The United Nations High-Level Committee on Programs sanctioned the establishment of the United Nations-Oceans in 2003 as the fresh interagency network within the UN system.

In Resolution 57/141, the General Assembly called upon the Secretary-General to create an efficient, transparent, and regular inter-agency coordination system for ocean and coastal issues within the United Nations system. On October 31, 2003, the United Nations System Chief Executives Board for Coordination (CEB) endorsed the decision made by the High-Level Committee on Programs (HLCP) to establish a network focused on ocean and coastal areas, originally named OCAN and later rebranded as UN-Oceans.

In 2013, the General Assembly, as outlined in Resolution 68/70, acknowledged the achievements of UN-Oceans to date, approved updated terms of reference for the organization, complete with an amended mandate (as included in the resolution's annex), and committed to reviewing these terms of reference during its seventy-second session, considering the progress made by UN-Oceans.

== UN Atlas of the Oceans ==
The UN Atlas of the Oceans was created under the authority of the UN-Oceans as an information system designed for policy-makers and scientists to help them to know more about the oceans such as its biology, geology, research and exploration; issues of concern such as sustainable development and food security; and the uses of the ocean such as human settlement and extraction.
