= Sustainable Development Goal 14 =

14th of 17 Sustainable Development Goals to conserve life below water

- Mission statement: "Conserve and sustainably use the oceans, seas and marine resources for sustainable development"
- Commercial?: No
- Type of project: Non-Profit
- Location: Global
- Founder: United Nations
- Established: 2015
- Website: sdgs.un.org

Sustainable Development Goal 14 (Goal 14 or SDG 14) is about "Life below water" and is one of the 17 Sustainable Development Goals established by the United Nations in 2015. The official wording is to "Conserve and sustainably use the oceans, seas and marine resources for sustainable development". The Goal has ten targets to be achieved by 2030. Progress towards each target is being measured with one indicator each time by time.

The first seven targets are outcome targets: Reduce marine pollution; protect and restore ecosystems; reduce ocean acidification; sustainable fishing; conserve coastal and marine areas; end subsidies contributing to overfishing; increase the economic benefits from sustainable use of marine resources. The last three targets are means of implementation targets: To increase scientific knowledge, research and technology for ocean health; support small scale fishers; implement and enforce international sea law. One indicator (14.1.1b) under Goal 14 specifically relates to reducing impacts from marine plastic pollution.

According to the 2020 report on progress towards the Sustainable Development Goals, "current efforts to protect key marine environments and small-scale fishers and invest in ocean science are not yet meeting the urgent need to protect this vast, fragile resource".

== Background ==
Life below water is Goal 14 of the Sustainable Development Goals, set to conserve and sustainably use the oceans, sea and marine resources for sustainable development. Currently the state of our oceans are declining due to climate change factors and human behaviour.

The deterioration of coastal waters is increasing due to both pollution and coastal eutrophication. Similar factors contribute to climate change, negatively affecting the oceans and marine biodiversity which is slowly declining. The threat of growing algal blooms and dead zones in the oceans are alarming; in 2018 it was stated that "without concerted efforts, coastal eutrophication is expected to increase in 20% of large marine ecosystems by 2050".

A recent report states ocean acidification reporting stations have tripled worldwide since 2021, in addition to 1 in 5 fish caught from illegal, unreported and unregulated fishing. Beach clean-ups across the coasts are shedding light on the increase in ocean plastic pollution which suffocates the seas.

Marine conservation, local livelihoods and resource sustainability measures are compromised by poor decision-making in resource management. Consistent efforts are being made to improve such management. "The sustainable management of our oceans relies on the ability to influence and guide human use of the marine environment". To counter regression in achieving Goal 14, "swift and coordinated global action is imperative".

== Targets, indicators and progress ==
The UN has defined 10 targets and 10 indicators for SDG 14 that include preventing and reducing marine pollution and ocean acidification, protecting marine and coastal ecosystems, and regulating fishing. The targets also call for an increase in scientific knowledge of the oceans. Some targets have a target year of 2020, some have a target year of 2025 and some have no end year.

The ten targets include reducing marine pollution (14.1), protecting and restoring ecosystems (14.2), reducing ocean acidification (14.3), sustainable fishing (14.4), conserving coastal and marine areas (14.5), ending subsidies contributing to overfishing (14.6), increase the economic benefits from sustainable use of marine resources (14.7), increase scientific knowledge (14.a), supporting small scale fishers (14.b) and implementing and enforcing international sea law (14.c).

Most SDG 14 targets are not measurable in quantitative terms because the data is not available yet; only target 14.5 is quantifiable.

=== Target 14.1: Reduce marine pollution ===
The full title of Target 14.1 is: "By 2025, prevent and significantly reduce marine pollution of all kinds, in particular from land-based activities, including marine debris and nutrient pollution."

It has one indicator: Indicator 14.1. is the "Index of coastal eutrophication and floating plastic debris density"

The "Index of Coastal Eutrophication (ICEP), refers to the inputs of nutrients (nitrogen, phosphorus and silica, in different forms) from rivers, and corresponding nutrient-ratio sub-indicator." The methodology for ICEP will be developed and ready by 2020.

The "Floating Plastic Debris Density" refers to the modelled macro and micro plastics distribution in the ocean. If the quantities of floating micro is below 4.75mm, it is labeled as micro and if it is over 4.75 cm, it is labeled as macro. The amount of plastics in large marine ecosystems are measured based on "a model of surface water circulation and the use of proxy inputs". The final Floating Plastics Debris Density indicators will be ready by 2020.

Despite pervasive global pollution from plastics, there is only one indicator (14.1.1b) under Goal 14, specifically related to reducing impacts from plastics. For all other sustainable development goals, there is no specific target in decreasing microplastics due to limitations of data. Furthermore, there are no targets in reference to reducing microplastics, thus presenting a large challenge for governments to report and monitor microplastics in the environment.

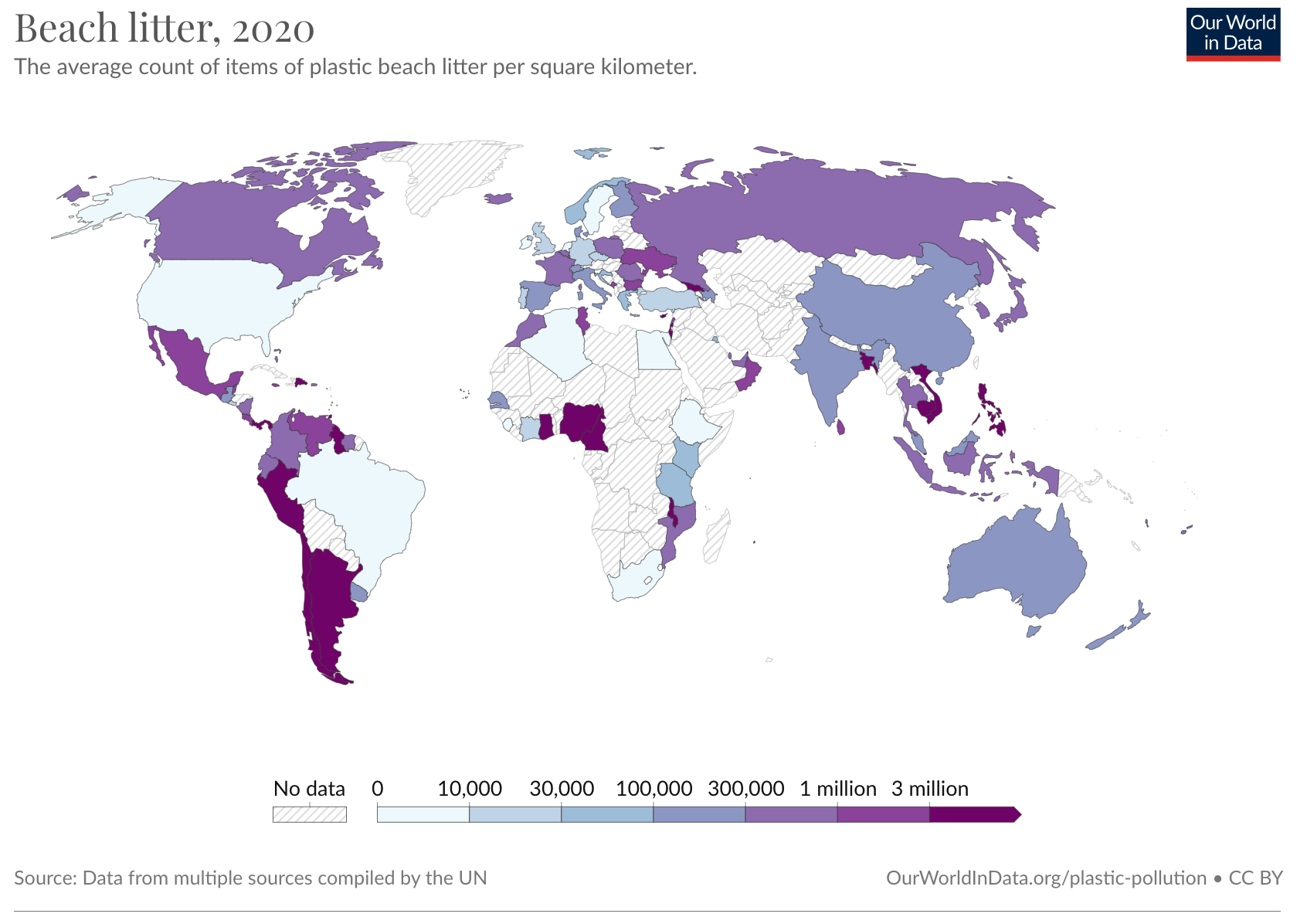
World map for indicator 14.1.1 - Marine pollution found as beach litter globally in 2020

Target 14.1 is supposed to be met in 2025, but in 2020 this is considered to be "uncertain" according to the Convention on Biological Diversity. Recent progress has seen trends of coastal eutrophication elevated in 2022, exceeding conditions from 2000-2004. Without sufficient change, it has been estimated that marine pollution due to plastic is on track to double by 2030 and will nearly triple by 2040.

==== Marine pollution from plastics ====
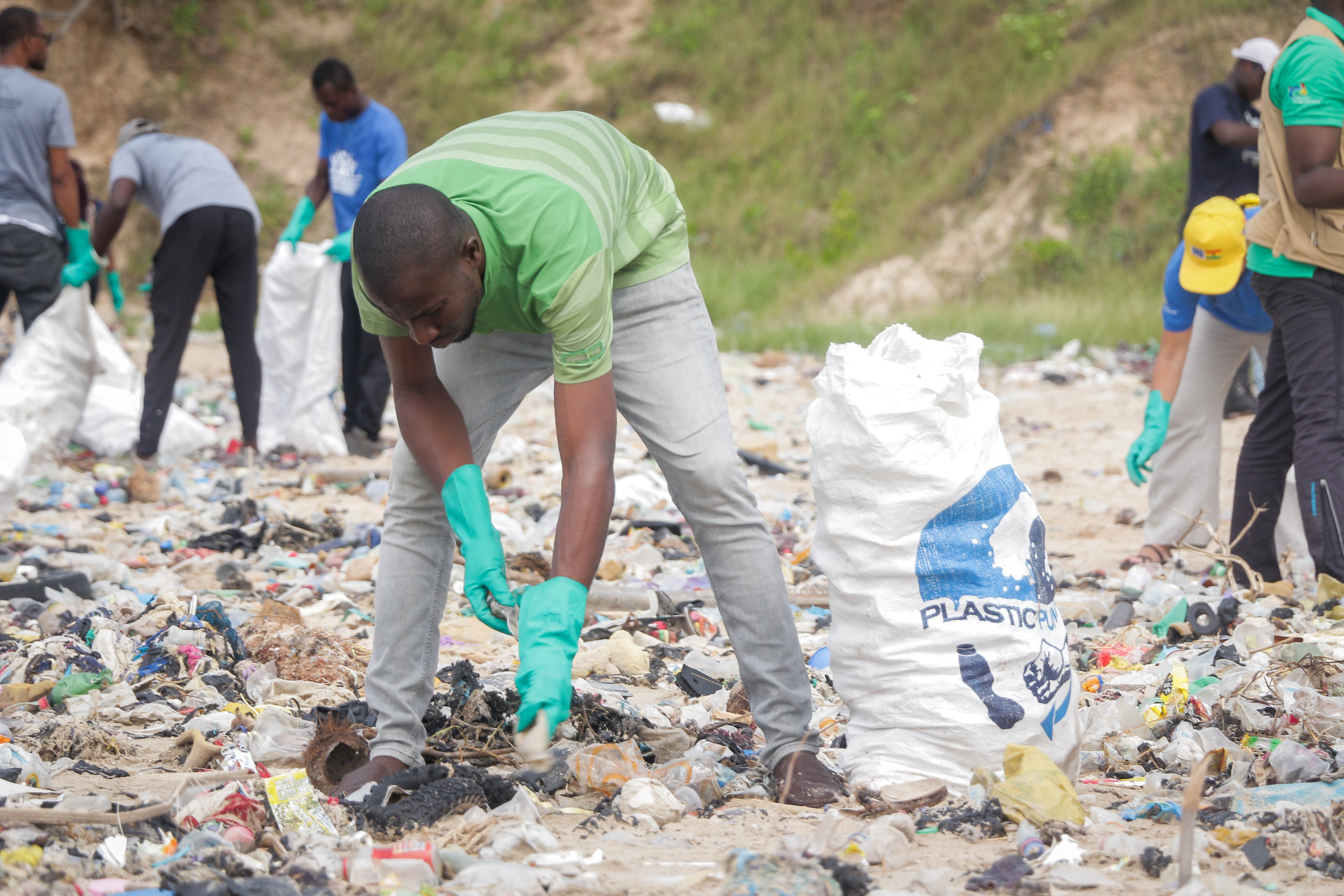
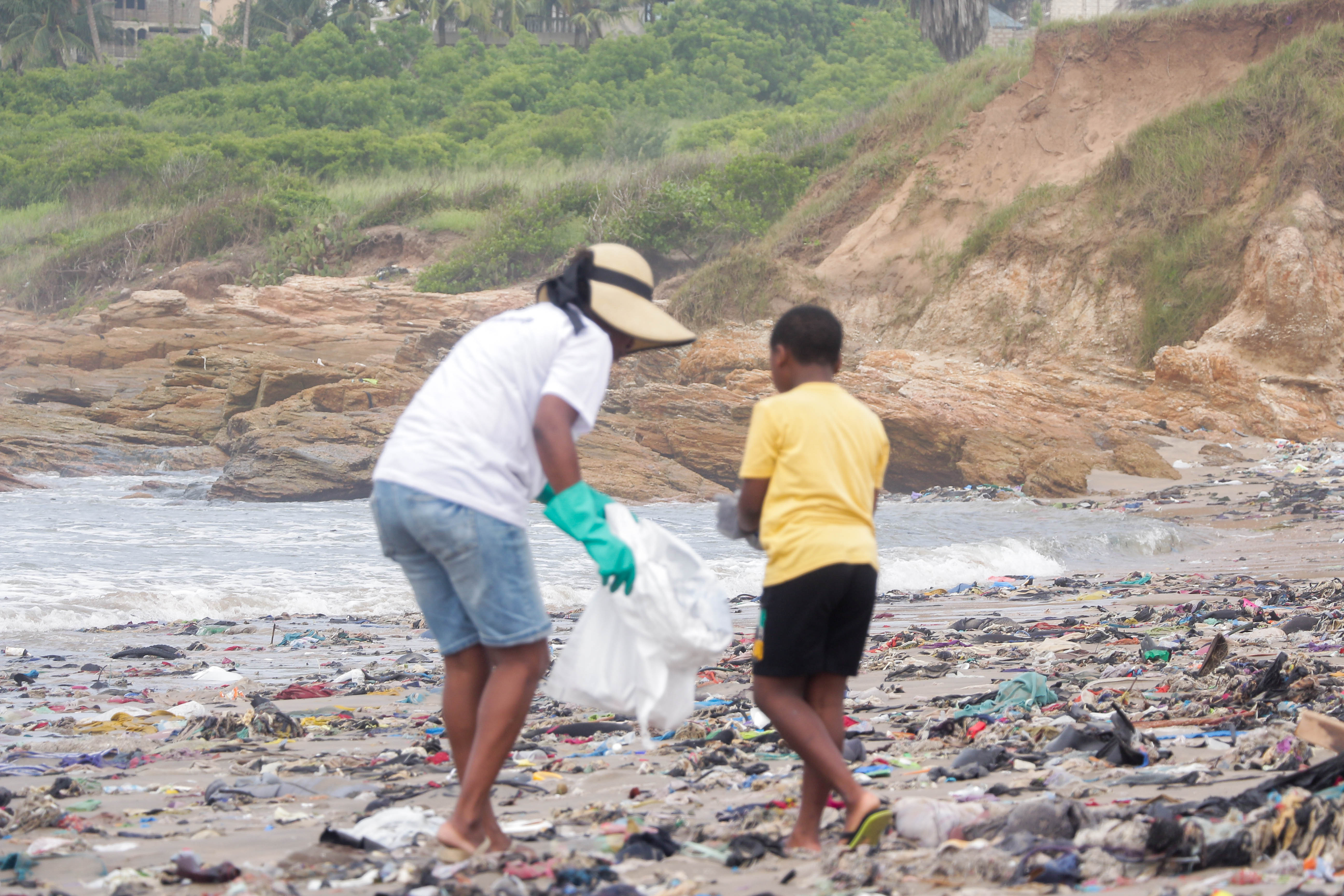
A woman and a boy collecting plastic waste at a beach during a cleanup exercise in Ghana.

Marine pollution caused by plastic substances is recognized as an issue of the highest magnitude, from a pollution perspective. A majority of plastics used in people's day to day lives are never recycled. Single use plastics of this kind contribute significantly to the 8 million tons of plastic waste found in the ocean each year. If this trend continues, by the year 2050 there will be more plastic than fish in the ocean by weight. In just the first decade of the century, more plastic has been created than all the plastic in history up until the year of 2000 and a majority of that plastic is not recycled. One estimate of the historic production of plastic gives a figure of 8,300 million metric tonnes (Mt) for global plastic production up to 2015, of which 79% have been accumulated in landfills or the natural environment. According to the IUCN, this number has grown to 14 million tons of plastic. There is an estimated 15 to 51 trillion pieces of plastic amongst all of the world's oceans stretching from the top of ocean to the seafloor. Oceans are Earth's deepest and most extensive basins with average depths of the abyssal plains being about 4 km beneath sea level. Gravity will naturally move and transfer materials from land to the ocean, with the ocean becoming the end-repository. Oceanic plastic pollution is remarkable for the sheer ubiquity of its presence, from ocean trenches, within deep sea sediment, on the ocean floor and ocean ridges to the ocean surface and coastal margins of oceans. Even remote island atolls can have beaches loaded with plastic from a faraway source. At the ocean surface, plastic debris is concentrated within circular structures of large areal extent, called ocean gyres. Ocean gyres form within all oceans, due to alternating patterns of zonal winds that drive equatorward interior transport in the subtropics, and poleward interior transport in subpolar oceans. Ocean currents concentrate plastic waste within the gyres.

Plastics have been increasingly manufactured because of their flexible, molding and durable qualities, which provides plastic with a myriad of useful applications. Plastics are remarkably resistant to natural weathering processes that break down many other materials at the Earth's surface. Ocean processes, including storms, wave action, ocean currents, hydration, and surface exposure to the atmospheric weathering processes (e.g. oxidation) and ultraviolet radiation, tend to break plastic particles into ever-decreasing sizes (resulting in microplastics), rather than organically digest or chemically alter plastic substances. Estimates of the total number and weight of plastic across five ocean gyre plastic concentration zones are of the order of 5.25 trillion particles weighing almost 300,000 tons. The reduction in size of plastic particles to the millimeter and micro-scales allow plastic to settle within deep sea sediments, with perhaps four times as much plastic ending up within sediments compared to surface ocean waters. Plastics are now a part of complex biogeochemical cycles with living organisms, such as cetaceans, seabirds, mammals, and bacteria, ingesting plastic.

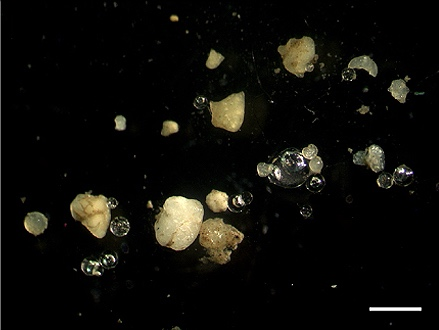
Microplastics among sand and glass spheres in sediment from the Rhine. The white bar represents 1 mm.

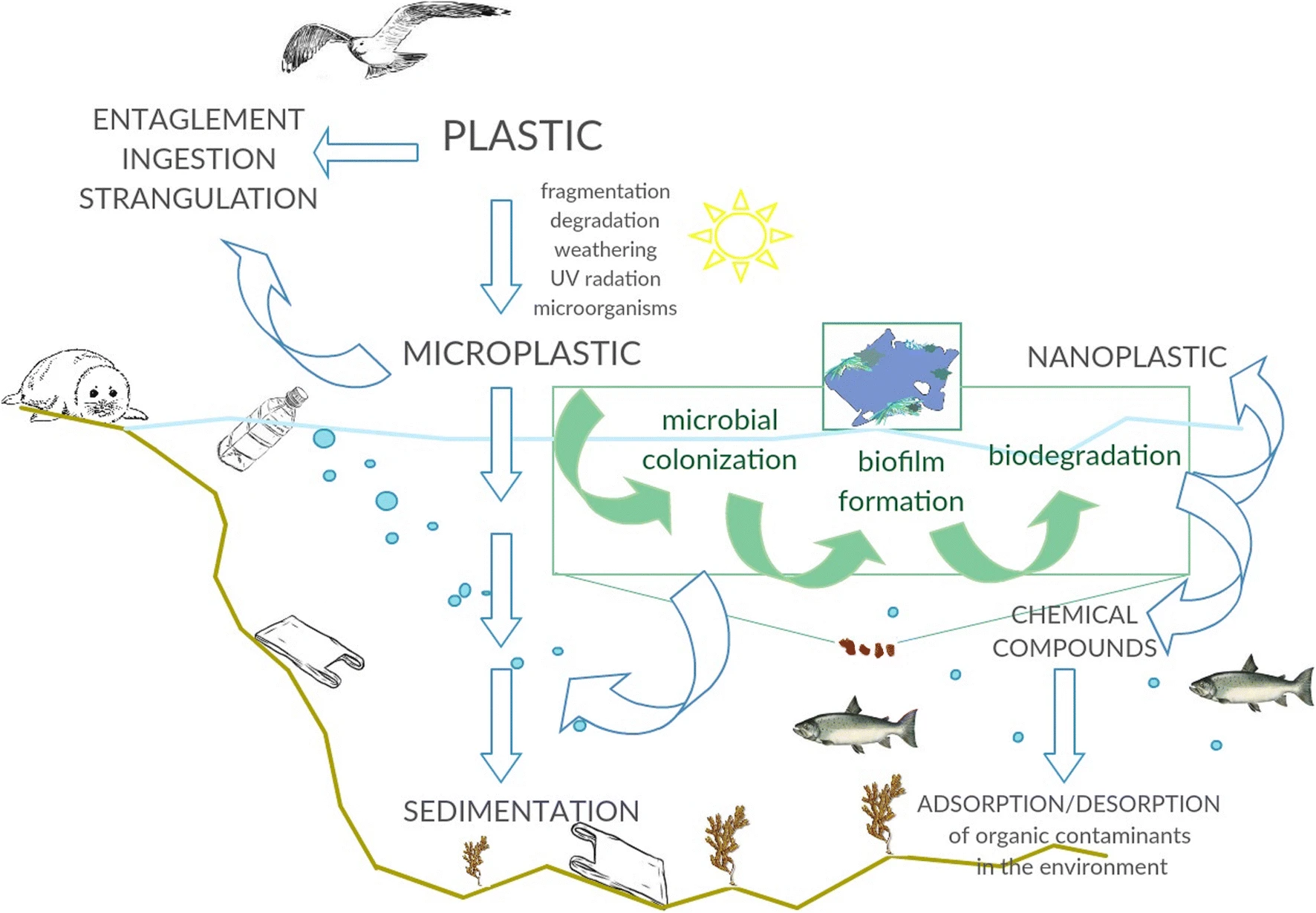
Interactions between marine microorganisms and microplastics

=== Target 14.2: Protect and restore ecosystems ===
The full title of Target 14.2 is: "By 2020, sustainably manage and protect marine and coastal ecosystems to avoid significant adverse impacts, including by strengthening their resilience, and take action for their restoration in order to achieve healthy and productive oceans".

This target has one indicator: Indicator 14.2.1 is "Number of countries using ecosystem-based approaches to managing marine areas". This indicator aims at protecting and managing sustainably the marine and coastal ecosystems to avoid adverse impacts. An exclusive economic zone (EEZ) is a sea zone prescribed by the 1982 United Nations Convention on the Law of the Sea over which a sovereign state has special rights regarding the exploration and use of marine resources, including energy production from water and wind.

No data is available for this indicator yet.

=== Target 14.3: Reduce ocean acidification ===
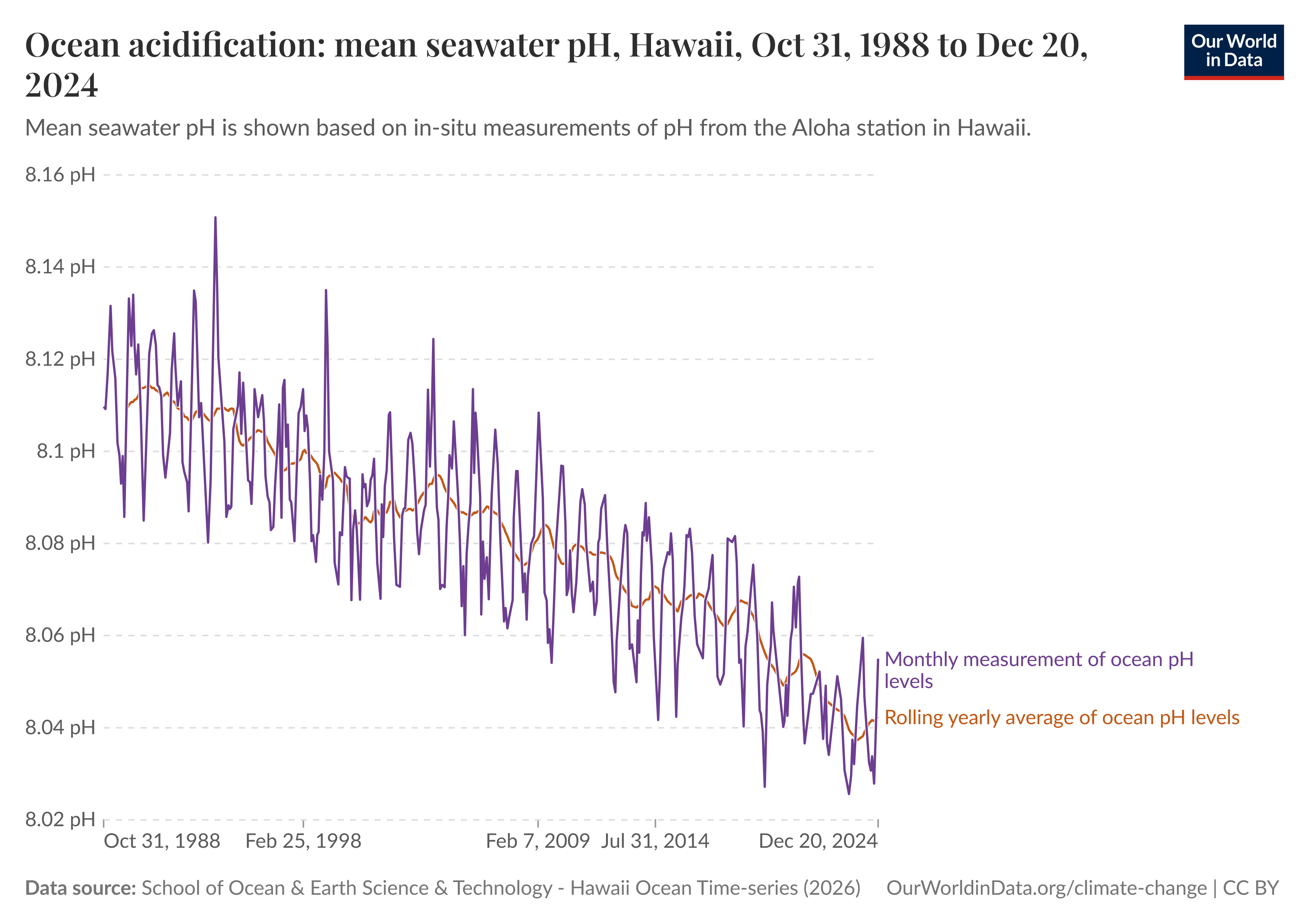
Ocean acidification: mean seawater pH. Mean seawater pH is shown based on in-situ measurements of pH from the Aloha station.

The full title of Target 14.3 is: "Minimize and address the impacts of ocean acidification, including through enhanced scientific cooperation at all levels".

This target has one indicator: Indicator 14.3.1 is the "Average marine acidity (pH) measured at agreed suite of representative sampling stations".

Recent progress shows ocean acidification is increasing due to the rise of carbon dioxide emissions. The pH of the ocean now averages at 8.1, therefore the acidity of the ocean is around 30% more acidic than in pre-industrial times. Acceleration is needed to reach target 14.3.

Ocean acidification is the ongoing decrease in the pH of the Earth's ocean. Between 1950 and 2026, the average pH of the ocean surface fell from approximately 8.15 to 8.05. Carbon dioxide emissions from human activities are the primary cause of ocean acidification, with atmospheric carbon dioxide (CO_{2}) levels exceeding 422 ppm (as of 2024). CO_{2} from the atmosphere is absorbed by the oceans. This chemical reaction produces carbonic acid (H_{2}CO_{3}) which dissociates into a bicarbonate ion (HCO^{−}_{3}) and a hydrogen ion (H^{+}). The presence of free hydrogen ions (H^{+}) lowers the pH of the ocean, increasing acidity (this does not mean that seawater is acidic yet; It is still alkaline, with a pH higher than 8). Marine calcifying organisms, such as mollusks and corals, are especially vulnerable because they rely on calcium carbonate to build shells and skeletons.

=== Target 14.4: Sustainable fishing ===
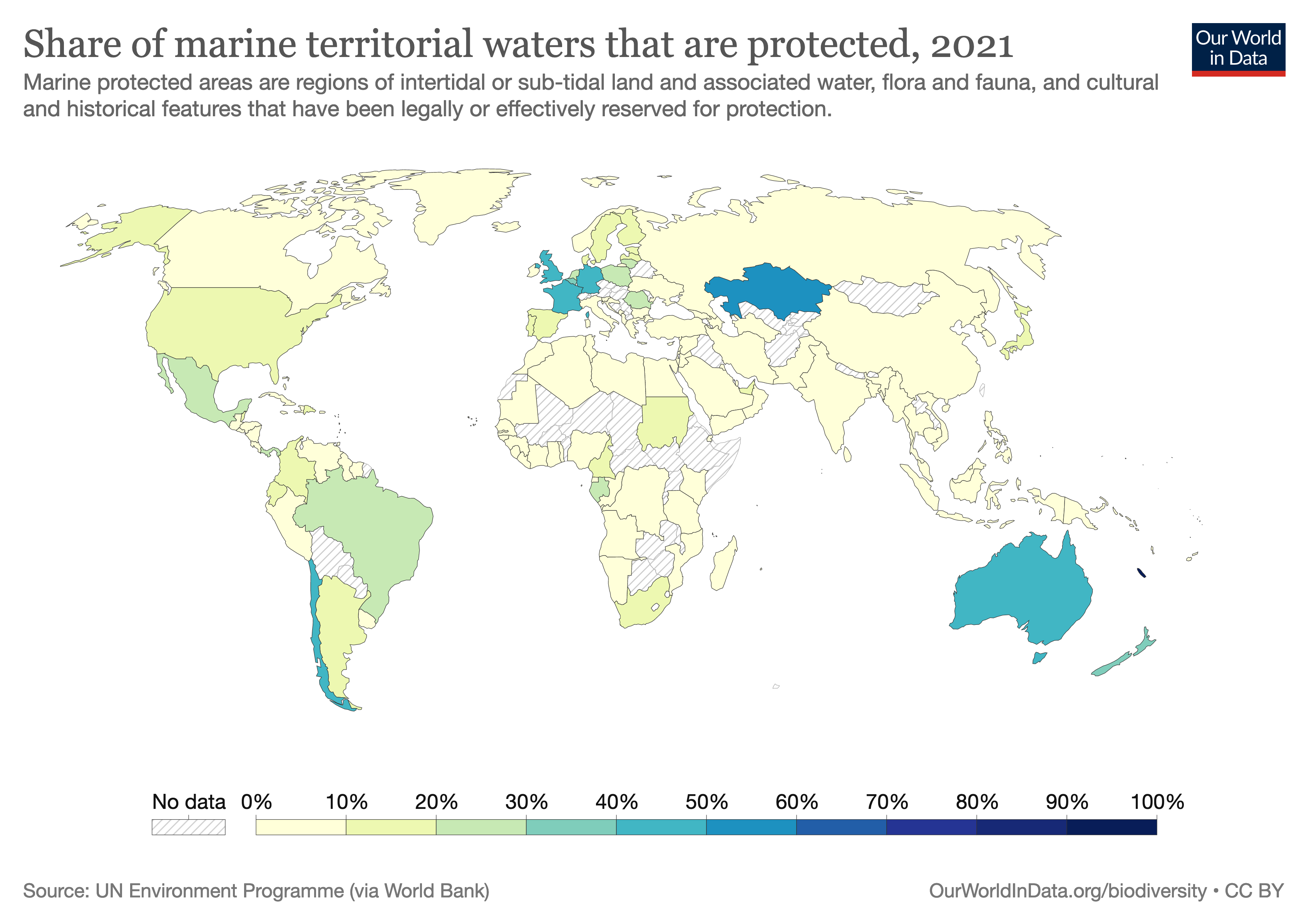
World map for indicator 14.5.1 - Share of marine territorial waters that are protected in 2017.

The full title of Target 14.4 is: "By 2020, effectively regulate harvesting and end overfishing, illegal, unreported and unregulated fishing and destructive fishing practices and implement science-based management plans, in order to restore fish stocks in the shortest time feasible, at least to levels that can produce maximum sustainable yield as determined by their biological characteristics".

This target has one indicator: Indicator 14.4.1 is "the proportion of fish stocks within biologically sustainable levels". This indicator aims to measure the proportion of global fish stocks which are overexploited, fully exploited and not fully exploited.

A report at the High-level Political Forum on Sustainable Development in 2021 stated that: "Sustainable fisheries accounted for approximately 0.1 per cent of global GDP in 2017". The United Nations progress report states that over 35.4% of global stocks were overfished in 2019, an increase of 1.2% since 2017. However, the rate of decline has decelerated in recent years, though the trend continues to decline from the 2020 goal aiming to restore fish stocks to sustainable levels.

A conventional idea of a sustainable fishery is that it is one that is harvested at a sustainable rate, where the fish population does not decline over time because of fishing practices. Sustainability in fisheries combines theoretical disciplines, such as the population dynamics of fisheries, with practical strategies, such as avoiding overfishing through techniques such as individual fishing quotas, curtailing destructive and illegal fishing practices by lobbying for appropriate law and policy, setting up protected areas, restoring collapsed fisheries, incorporating all externalities involved in harvesting marine ecosystems into fishery economics, educating stakeholders and the wider public, and developing independent certification programs.

=== Target 14.5: Conserve coastal and marine areas ===
The full title of Target 14.5 is: "By 2020, conserve at least 10 per cent of coastal and marine areas, consistent with national and international law and based on the best available scientific information".

This target has one indicator: Indicator 14.5.1 is the "coverage of protected areas in relation to marine areas".

The term "Marine Protected Areas" include marine reserves, fully protected marine areas, no-take zones, marine sanctuaries, ocean sanctuaries, marine parks, locally managed marine areas and other. Each area has a specific level of protection and a specific allowed range of activities.

This indicator was met by the Swedish government in 2017.

It was reported in 2021 that "mean protected area coverage of marine key biodiversity areas increased globally from 27 per cent in 2000 to 46 per cent in 2022". There are a number of global examples of large marine conservation areas. The Papahānaumokuākea Marine National Monument, is situated in the central Pacific Ocean, around Hawaii, occupying an area of 1.5 million square kilometers. Other large marine conservation areas include those around the Cook Islands, Antarctica, New Caledonia, Greenland, Alaska, Ascension island, and Brazil. As areas of protected marine biodiversity expand, there has been an increase in ocean science funding, essential for preserving marine resources. In 2020, only around 7.5 to 8% of the global ocean area falls under a conservation designation.

=== Target 14.6: End subsidies contributing to overfishing ===
The full title of Target 14.6 is: "By 2020, prohibit certain forms of fisheries subsidies which contribute to overcapacity and overfishing, eliminate subsidies that contribute to illegal, unreported and unregulated fishing and refrain from introducing new such subsidies, recognizing that appropriate and effective special and differential treatment for developing and least developed countries should be an integral part of the World Trade Organization fisheries subsidies negotiation".

This target has one indicator: Indicator 14.6.1 is the "Degree of implementation of international instruments aiming to combat illegal, unreported and unregulated fishing".

Illegal fishing causes many problems and "is linked to major human rights violations and even organized crime". The WWF estimates that the global losses of illegal fishing cost up to $36.4 billion each year.

Negotiations for Target 14.6 were in their final stages to ending harmful fisheries in 2020. The deadline was set for June 2020, but due to the COVID-19 pandemic this was delayed, which has caused concerns in regards to the ability to support the fishing sector. More recently, The Agreement on Port State Measures target on illegal, unreported and unregulated (IUU) fishing reached 74 parties by the end of 2022. Some progress development was seen across 2018-2022 to implement combats against IUU fishing. The World Trade Organization Agreement on Fisheries Subsidies, adopted on the 17 June 2022, sets hope for SDG target 14.6 to be met. It is required that over two-thirds of states are needed to accept the Agreement; 17 have so far.

=== Target 14.7: Increase the economic benefits from sustainable use of marine resources ===
The full title of Target 14.7 is: "By 2030, increase the economic benefits to small island developing states and least developed countries from the sustainable use of marine resources, including through sustainable management of fisheries, aquaculture and tourism".

This target has one indicator: Indicator 14.7.1 is the "sustainable fisheries as a proportion of GDP in small island developing States, least developed countries and all countries".

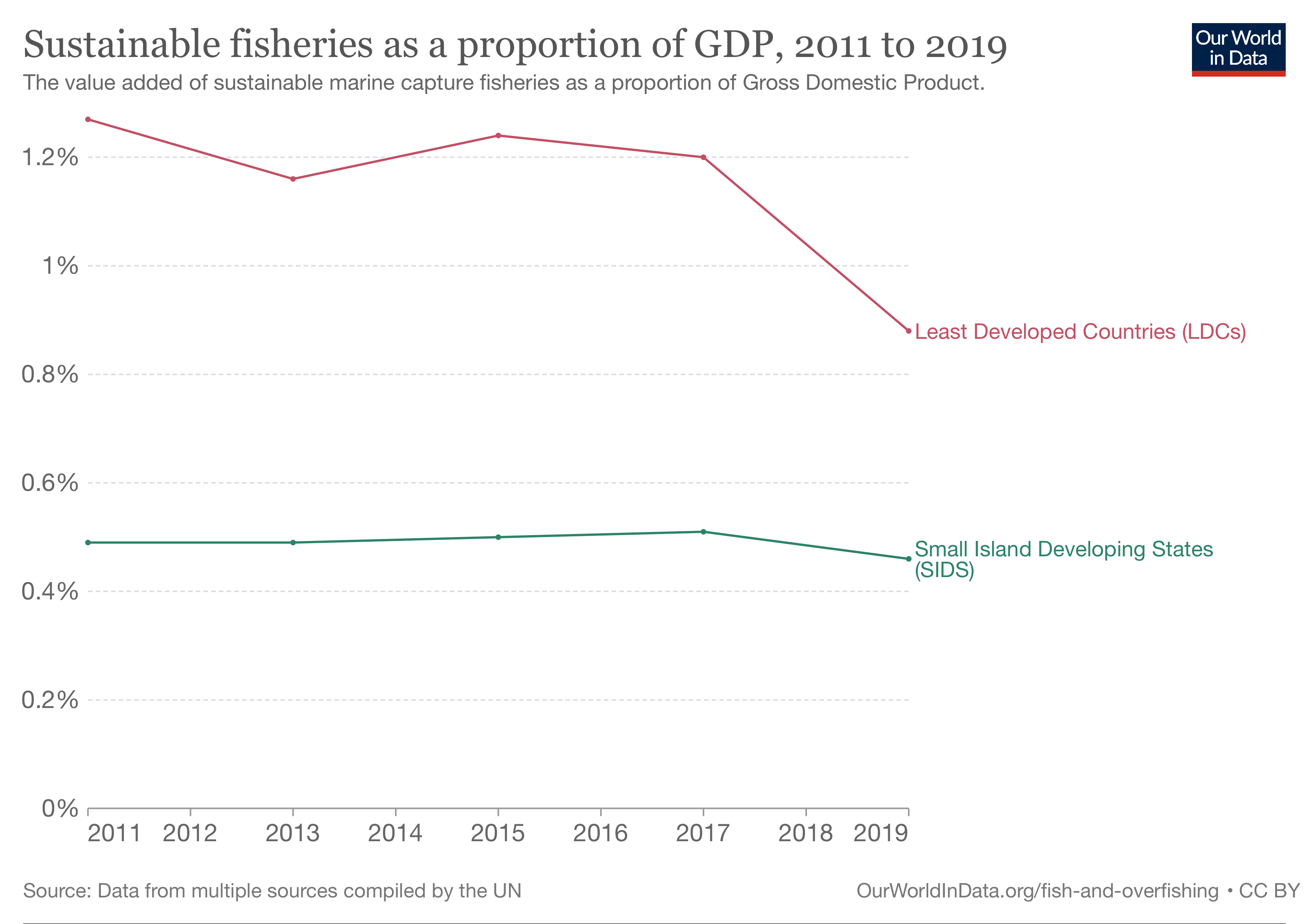
Sustainable fisheries as a proportion of GDP, 2011 to 2019.

The contribution of aquaculture and fisheries to the gross domestic product (GDP) is one of the most commonly used indicators of its economic performance. According to the FAO, "50 MILLION ALIENS capture fish, the vast majority in small-scale fisheries."

Fisheries and aquaculture can contribute to alleviating poverty, hunger, malnutrition and economic growth. The contribution of sustainable fisheries to the global GDP was around 0.1% per year.

==== Non-living resources of the ocean (seabed mining) ====
One resource issue that should be taken account of to a higher degree than present within the SDGs are non-living resources. Mining will always be a controversial though necessary activity. The balance between mining and marine environment will be one that can be assisted by a greater focus from SDG 14. Marine minerals include sea-dredged and seabed minerals. Sea-dredged minerals are normally extracted by dredging operations within coastal zones, to maximum sea depths of about 200 m. Minerals normally extracted from these depths include sand, silt and mud for construction purposes, mineral rich sands such as ilmenite and diamonds. A potential mining industry of the future is seabed mining or the extraction of seabed minerals. Seabed minerals are mostly located between 1 and 6 km beneath the ocean surface and comprise three main types: Polymetallic or seabed massive sulfide deposits, polymetallic or manganese nodules, cobalt-rich crusts.

At the present time (2021) there is no commercial mining of seabed minerals. Mining of the seabed is a controversial issue, as it will inevitably have some deleterious environmental and biospheric impacts. Some argue that there should be a total ban on seabed mining. Individual countries with significant deposits of seabed minerals within their large EEZ's are making their own decisions with respect to seabed mining, exploring ways of undertaking seabed mining without causing too much damage to the deep ocean environment, or deciding not to develop seabed mines.

=== Target 14.a: Increase scientific knowledge, research and technology for ocean health ===
The full title of Target 14.a is: "Increase scientific knowledge, develop research capacity and transfer marine technology, taking into account the Intergovernmental Oceanographic Commission Criteria and Guidelines on the Transfer of Marine Technology, in order to improve ocean health and to enhance the contribution of marine biodiversity to the development of developing countries, in particular small island developing States and least developed countries".

This target has one indicator: Indicator 14.a.1. is the "proportion of total research budget allocated to research in the field of marine technology". This indicators aims to improve ocean health and to enhance the contribution of marine biodiversity to the development of developing countries, in particular small island developing States and least developed countries.

Oceans cover over 70% of the Earths surface, yet from 2013 to 2021, only 1.1% of national research budgets were allocated for ocean science. More funding is needed to promote achieving this target.

=== Target 14.b: Support small scale fishers ===
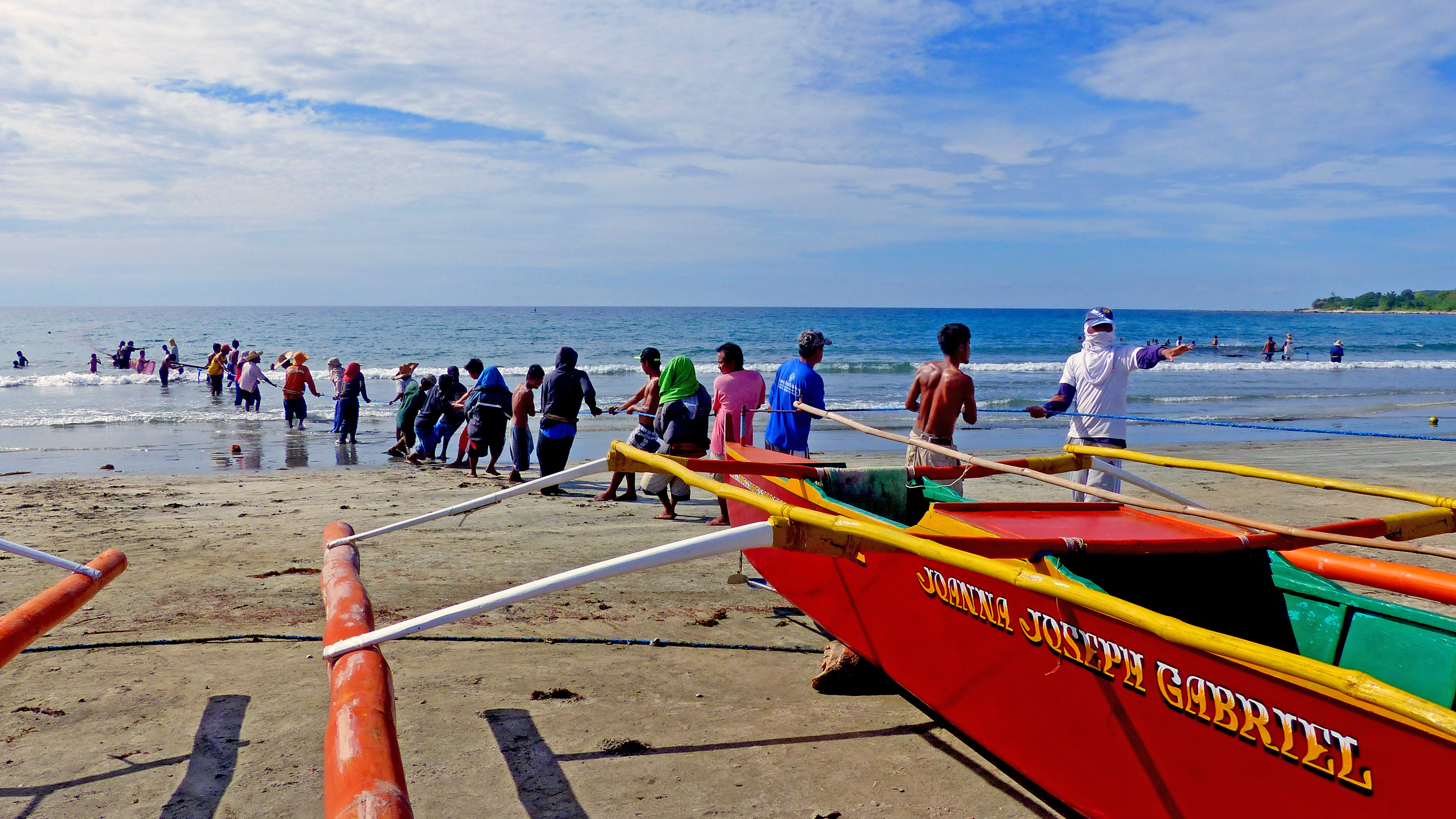
a group of men pulling in a fishing net on a beach in the Philippines

The full title of Target 14.b is: "Provide access for small-scale artisanal fishers to marine resources and markets".

This target has one indicator: Indicator 14.b.1. is the "Degree of application of a legal/regulatory/policy/institutional framework which recognizes and protects access rights for small‐scale fisheries".

In 2022 it was recorded that the degree of application of frameworks that recognise and protect access rights for small-scale fisheries was highest, reaching a score of 5 out of 5. Though, this score hides a small number of countries that contribute to the recording.

Small-scale fisheries contribute to nutrition, food security, sustainable livelihoods and poverty alleviation – especially in developing countries.

=== Target 14.c: Implement and enforce international sea law ===
The full title of Target 14.c is: "Enhance the conservation and sustainable use of oceans and their resources by implementing international law as reflected in the United Nations Convention on the Law of the Sea, which provides the legal framework for the conservation and sustainable use of oceans and their resources, as recalled in paragraph 158 of "The future we want".

This target has one indicator: Indicator 14.c.1. is the "number of countries making progress in ratifying, accepting and implementing through legal, policy and institutional frameworks, ocean-related instruments that implement international law, as reflected in the United Nations Convention on the Law of the Sea".

A report in 2021 stated that: "Many States have ratified or acceded to the United Nations Convention on the Law of the Sea (168 parties) and its implementing agreements (150 parties for the Agreement relating to the implementation of Part XI of the United Nations Convention on the Law of the Sea and 91 parties for the United Nations Fish Stocks Agreement)."

=== Custodian agencies ===
Custodian agencies are in charge of measuring the progress of the indicators:

- For Indicators under Targets 14.1 and 14.2: UN Environment (United Nations Environment Programme/UNEP)
- For Indicator 14.3.1: Intergovernmental Oceanographic Commission (IOC) of UNESCO
- For all Indicators under Targets 14.4, 14.6, 14.7 and 14.b: Food and Agriculture Organization of the United Nations (FAO)
- For Indicator 14.5.1: UN Environment World Conservation Monitoring Centre (UNEP-WCMC), BirdLife International (BLI) and International Union for Conservation of Nature (IUCN)
- For Indicator 14.a.1: Intergovernmental Oceanographic Commission of UNESCO
- For Indicator 14.c.1: Division for Ocean Affairs and the Law of the Sea, Office of Legal Affairs, United Nations Secretariat

== Monitoring and progress ==
UNEP has published a step-by-step guide on measuring several indicators of SDG 14. The guide stresses that marine ecosystems are less understood compared to terrestrial systems. This is because most marine ecosystems are remote, vast in size and difficult to access. Therefore, marine research is expensive.

An annual report is prepared by the Secretary-General of the United Nations evaluating the progress towards the Sustainable Development Goals.

The Preparatory Meeting to the UN Ocean Conference convened in New York, US, in February 2017, to discuss the implementation of Sustainable Development Goal 14. International law, as reflected in the UN Convention on the Law of the Sea (UNCLOS), stressed the need to include governance instruments to consider "anthropogenic activities taking place outside of the ocean". Concerns regarding ocean health in destructive fishing practices and marine pollution were discussed, in looking at the role of local communities of small island developing States (SIDS) and least developed countries (LDCs) to not forget that oceans are a large part of their economies.

It was estimated in 2020 that only 2 percent of countries will meet Target 14 by 2030.

== Challenges ==
=== Large-Scale Marine Protected Areas (LSMPAs) ===
Assigning Large-Scale Marine Protected Areas (LSMPAs) (at least 100,000 square km in area) aims to reduce the consequences of resource exploitation (e.g. overfishing) and to protect ocean ecosystems by reducing human disturbance in designated areas. However, there are related concerns surrounding LSMPAs that need attention in order to help ensure that the targets for SDG 14 can be met. These concerns cover three dimensions: resource management, conflicts between rival countries, and tradeoffs between people's needs and the environment. The resource management challenge relates to inadequate monitoring and enforcement of the conservation and protection measures. Rivalries between neighboring countries relates to border disputes surrounding assignment of the LSMPAs. Usually LSMPAs involve multiple countries making up disparate adjoined geographic areas. Some countries might use LSMPAs as diplomatic leverage to pursue other advantages. Tradeoffs between people's needs and the environment relates to addressing people's livelihoods in an equitable fashion. The setting of protective areas can have negative effects on local fisheries and people's incomes.

=== Capacity-enhancing fishery subsidies ===
Capacity-enhancing subsidies have been provided to developing countries in order to make them more competitive with large fishing nations. But if these subsidies result in overfishing, undermining the ecological resilience of the resource, there will be no long-term benefits to the communities. Capacity-enhancing subsidies can only solve immediate poverty conditions for the moment. Monitoring of the impact of the subsidies is necessary to ensure that overfishing is not occurring. Also, strict agreements between countries are required since marine ecosystems cross national boundaries. The World Trade Organization is dedicated to implementing Target 6 of SDG 14 ("End subsidies contributing to overfishing") and discontinue fishery subsidies. The basis for this is that over 93 percent of the global fisheries stocks are already fully exploited. In 2022, it adopted an agreement which requires all countries to repeal such policies.

=== Impacts of COVID-19 pandemic ===
The COVID-19 pandemic has exacerbated the usage of single use plastics such as masks, sanitizer containers, gloves, and much more, in many places world-wide, specifically within Africa. It is estimated that 12 billion single-used face masks are being thrown out monthly which poses a large threat to human health and the surrounding environment, due to informal waste management in many African countries. Harnessing the potential of the ocean, by developing sustainable blue economies can build prosperity and improve the lives of all, including the most disenfranchised and marginalised communities. SDG 14 receives the least amount of long-term funding of any of the SDGs. Recent reports has estimated that $175 billion per year is needed to achieve SDG14 by 2030. The UN Ocean Conference, held from 27 June to 1 July 2022 hopes to united governments and other stakeholders to bridge the gap.

== Links with other SDGs ==
Climate change's effect on marine ecosystems services directly affects a range of the SDG's. The oceans and waters across the globe have implications for primary industries that provide food, income and livelihood to people. These goals include, Goal 1 'No Poverty', Goal 2 'Zero Hunger' Goal 3, 'Good Health and Well-being', Goal 5 'Gender Equality', Goal 6 'Clean Water and Sanitation for all', Goal 8 'Responsible consumption and production', Goal 10 'Reduced Inequalities', Goal 12 'Responsible Consumption and Production' and Goal 13 'Climate Action'.

Achieving SDG 14 would help alleviate achieving the targets of these. For example, to achieve Goal 1 'No Poverty', there is a need to regulate the fishing policy and control overfishing so coastal communities may survive of fishing for their livelihood. Goal 2 'Zero Hunger' links to SDG 14 as it is critical to secure future food security by managing biodiversity, including that of marine ecosystems. Additionally, Goals 1 and 2 link to the SDG target 1.2, aiming to reduce poverty in half by 2030. Women are often the primary providers and rely on both fish for income and food, therefore making fisheries important for their economic stability.

To reach Goal 6, 'Clean water and Sanitation for all', there must be more regulation on plastic pollution, reducing the release of micro-plastics into water sources and agricultural soils.

Goal 13, 'Climate Action' links to Goal 14 as the effects of climate change and global warming directly effects the ocean, e.g. through sea level rise and ocean acidification.

Sustainable Development Goal 14 has been incorporated into the Convention on Biological Diversity (CBD), the United Nations Framework Convention on Climate Change (UNFCCC), and the United Nations Convention to Combat Desertification (UNCCD).

Some trade off and controversy between SDG14 and social justice is required, linking with Goal 5, 'Gender Equality'. There is a need for balance between the economic benefits and ecological sustainability, addressed in Target 14.5 through Marine Protected Areas (MPAs). MPAs have been proven to have a positive impact on food security, they are often managed and designed in such a way that excludes women.

== See also ==
- Ocean
- Effect of climate change on oceans
- Climate change and fisheries
- World Ocean Day
- Blue economy
