= Resource depletion =

Depletion of natural organic and inorganic resources

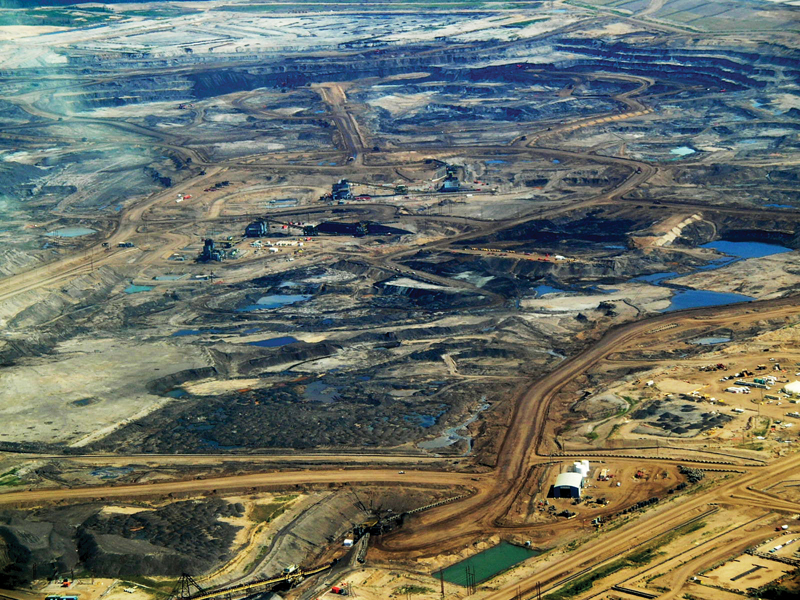
Tar sands in Alberta, 2008. Oil is one of the most used resources by humans.

Resource depletion occurs when a natural resource is consumed faster than it can be replenished. The value of a resource depends on its availability in nature and the cost of extracting it. By the economic law of supply and demand, the scarcer the resource the more valuable it becomes. There are several types of resource depletion, including but not limited to: wetland and ecosystem degradation, soil erosion, aquifer depletion, and overfishing. The depletion of wildlife populations is called defaunation.

It is a matter of research and debate how humanity will be impacted and what the future will look like if resource consumption continues at the current rate, and when specific resources will be completely exhausted.

== History of resource depletion ==
The depletion of resources has been an issue since the beginning of the 19th century amidst the First Industrial Revolution. The extraction of both renewable and non-renewable resources increased drastically, much further than thought possible pre-industrialization, due to the technological advancements and economic development that lead to an increased demand for natural resources.

Although resource depletion has roots in both colonialism and the Industrial Revolution, it has only been of major concern since the 1970s. Before this, many people believed in the "myth of inexhaustibility", which also has roots in colonialism. This can be explained as the belief that both renewable and non-renewable natural resources cannot be exhausted because there is seemingly an overabundance of these resources. This belief has caused people to not question resource depletion and ecosystem collapse when it occurred, and continues to prompt society to simply find these resources in areas which have not yet been depleted.

== Depletion accounting ==
In an effort to offset the depletion of resources, theorists have come up with the concept of depletion accounting. Related to green accounting, depletion accounting aims to account for nature's value on an equal footing with the market economy. Resource depletion accounting uses data provided by countries to estimate the adjustments needed due to their use and depletion of the natural capital available to them. Natural capital refers to natural resources such as mineral deposits or timber stocks. Depletion accounting factors in several different influences such as the number of years until resource exhaustion, the cost of resource extraction, and the demand for the resource. Resource extraction industries make up a large part of the economic activity in developing countries. This, in turn, leads to higher levels of resource depletion and environmental degradation in developing countries. Theorists argue that the implementation of resource depletion accounting is necessary in developing countries. Depletion accounting also seeks to measure the social value of natural resources and ecosystems. Measurement of social value is sought through ecosystem services, which are defined as the benefits of nature to households, communities and economies.

=== Importance ===
There are many different groups interested in depletion accounting. Environmentalists are interested in depletion accounting as a way to track the use of natural resources over time, hold governments accountable, or compare their environmental conditions to those of another country. Economists want to measure resource depletion to understand how financially reliant countries or corporations are on non-renewable resources, whether this use can be sustained and the financial drawbacks of switching to renewable resources in light of the depleting resources.

=== Issues ===
Depletion accounting is complex to implement as nature is not as quantifiable as cars, houses, or bread. For depletion accounting to work, appropriate units of natural resources must be established so that natural resources can be viable in the market economy. The main issues that arise when trying to do so are, determining a suitable unit of account, deciding how to deal with the "collective" nature of a complete ecosystem, delineating the borderline of the ecosystem, and defining the extent of possible duplication when the resource interacts in more than one ecosystem. Some economists want to include measurement of the benefits arising from public goods provided by nature, but currently there are no market indicators of value. Globally, environmental economics has not been able to provide a consensus of measurement units of nature's services.

== Minerals depletion ==
Minerals are needed to provide food, clothing, and housing. A United States Geological Survey (USGS) study found a significant long-term trend over the 20th century for non-renewable resources such as minerals to supply a greater proportion of the raw material inputs to the non-fuel, non-food sector of the economy; an example is the greater consumption of crushed stone, sand, and gravel used in construction.

Large-scale exploitation of minerals began in the Industrial Revolution around 1760 in England and has grown rapidly ever since. Technological improvements have allowed humans to dig deeper and access lower grades and different types of ore over that time. Virtually all basic industrial metals (copper, iron, bauxite, etc.), as well as rare earth minerals, face production output limitations from time to time, because supply involves large up-front investments and is therefore slow to respond to rapid increases in demand.

Minerals projected by some to enter production decline during the next 20 years:

- Oil, conventional (2005)
- Oil, all liquids (2017). Old expectation: Gasoline (2023)
- Copper (2017). Old expectation: Copper (2024). Data from the United States Geological Survey (USGS) suggest that it is very unlikely that copper production will peak before 2040.
- Coal per KWh (2017). Old expectation per ton: (2060)
- Zinc. Developments in hydrometallurgy have transformed non-sulfide zinc deposits (largely ignored until now) into large low cost reserves.

Minerals projected by some to enter production decline during the present century:

- Aluminium (2057)
- Iron (2068)

Such projections may change, as new discoveries are made and typically misinterpret available data on Mineral Resources and Mineral Reserves.

- Phosphor (2048). The last 80% of world reserves are only one mine.

Peak minerals marks the point in time when the largest production of a mineral will occur in an area, with production declining in subsequent years. While most mineral resources will not be exhausted in the near future, global extraction and production has become more challenging. Miners have found ways over time to extract deeper and lower grade ores with lower production costs. More than anything else, declining average ore grades are indicative of ongoing technological shifts that have enabled inclusion of more 'complex' processing – in social and environmental terms as well as economic – and structural changes in the minerals exploration industry and these have been accompanied by significant increases in identified Mineral Reserves.

=== Peak minerals ===
The concept of peak minerals offers a useful model for representing the changing impacts associated with processing declining resource qualities in the lead up to, and following, peak mineral production in a particular region within a certain time-frame.

Peak minerals provides an analytical framework within which the economic, social and environmental trajectories of a particular mining industry can be explored in relation to the continuing (and often increasing) production of mineral resources. It focuses consideration on the change in costs and impacts associated with processing easily accessible, lower cost ores before peak production of an individual mine or group of mines for a given mineral. It outlines how the economy might respond as processing becomes characterised by higher costs as the peak is approached and passed. Issues associated with the concept of peak minerals include:

- Average processed ore grades are in global decline for some minerals whilst production is increasing.
- Average discovered ore grades (e.g., in porphyry copper deposits) have remained remarkably steady over the last 150 years.
- Structural changes in the minerals exploration industry and the recent focus on "brownfields" exploration
- Mining is extending to deeper, more remote deposits.
- Individual mines or mining provinces can eventually become exhausted, though changes in demand and mining technology can act to prolong their productive lives.

==== Resource depletion and recoverability ====
Giurco et al. (2009) indicate that the debate about how to analytically describe resource depletion is ongoing. Traditionally, a fixed stock paradigm has been applied, but Tilton and Lagos (2007) suggest using an opportunity cost paradigm is better because the usable resource quantity is represented by price and the opportunity cost of using the resource. Unlike energy minerals such as coal or oil – or minerals used in a dissipative or metabolic fashion like phosphorus – most non-energy minerals and metals are unlikely to run out. Metals are inherently recyclable and more readily recoverable from end uses where the metal is used in a pure form and not transformed or dissipated; in addition, metal ore is accessible at a range of different grades. So, although metals are not facing exhaustion, they have become more challenging to obtain in the quantities that society demands, and the energy, environmental and social cost of acquiring them could constrain future increases in production and usage.

=== Cheap and easy in the past; costly and difficult in future ===
Peak production poses a problem for resource rich countries like Australia, which have developed a comparative advantage in the global resources sector, which may diminish in the future. The costs of mining, once primarily reflected in economic terms, are increasingly being considered in social and environmental terms, although these are yet to meaningfully inform long-term decision-making in the sector. Such consideration is particularly important if the industry is seeking to operate in a socially, environmentally and economically sustainable manner into the next 30–50 years.

==== Benefits from dependence on the resource sector ====
In 2008–09, minerals and fuel exports made up around 56% of Australia's total exports. Consequently, minerals play a major role in Australia's capacity to participate in international trade and contribute to the international strength of its currency. Whether this situation contributes to Australia's economic wealth or weakens its economic position is contested. While those supporting Australia's reliance on minerals cite the theory of comparative advantage, opponents suggest a reliance on resources leads to issues associated with 'Dutch disease' (a decline in other sectors of the economy associated with natural resource exploitation) and ultimately the hypothesised 'resource curse'.

==== Threats from dependence on the resource sector ====
Contrary to the theory of the comparative advantage, many mineral resource-rich countries are often outperformed by resource-poor countries. This paradox, where natural resource abundance actually has a negative impact on the growth of the national economy is termed the resource curse. After an initial economic boost, brought on by the booming minerals economy, negative impacts linked to the boom surpass the positive, causing economic activity to fall below the pre-resource windfall level.

===== Mineral supply and demand =====
The economics of a commodity are generally determined by supply and demand. Mineral supply and demand will change dramatically as all costs (economic, technological, social and environmental) associated with production, processing and transportation of minerals increases with falling ore grades. These costs will ultimately influence the ability of companies to supply commodities, and the ability of consumers to purchase them. It is likely that social and environmental issues will increasingly drive economic costs associated with supply and demand patterns.

===== Economic scarcity as a constraint to mineral supply =====
As neither overall stocks nor future markets are known, most economists normally do not consider physical scarcity as a good indicator for the availability of a resource for society.

===== Demand for minerals =====
While the ability to supply a commodity determines its availability as has been demonstrated, demand for minerals can also influence their availability. How minerals are used, where they are distributed and how, trade barriers, downstream use industries, substitution and recycling can potentially influence the demand for minerals, and ultimately their availability. While economists are cognisant of the role of demand as an availability driver, historically they have not considered factors besides depletion as having a long-term impact on mineral availability.

=== Future production ===
There are a variety of indicators that show production will become more difficult and more expensive. Key environmental indicators that reflect increasingly expensive production are primarily associated with the decline in average ore grades of many minerals. This has consequences in mineral exploration, for mine depth, the energy intensity of mining, and the increasing quantity of waste rock.

=== Social context ===
Different social issues must be addressed through time in relation to peak minerals at a national scale, and other issues manifest on the local scale.

As global mining companies seek to expand operations to access larger mining areas, competition with farmers for land and for scare water is likely to increase. Negative relationships with near neighbours influence companies' ability to establish and maintain a social license to operate within the community.

Access to identified resources is likely to become harder as questions are asked about the benefit from the regional economic development mining is reputed to bring.

=== Petroleum ===
Oil depletion is the decline in petroleum production of a well, oil field, or geographic area.

== Deforestation ==
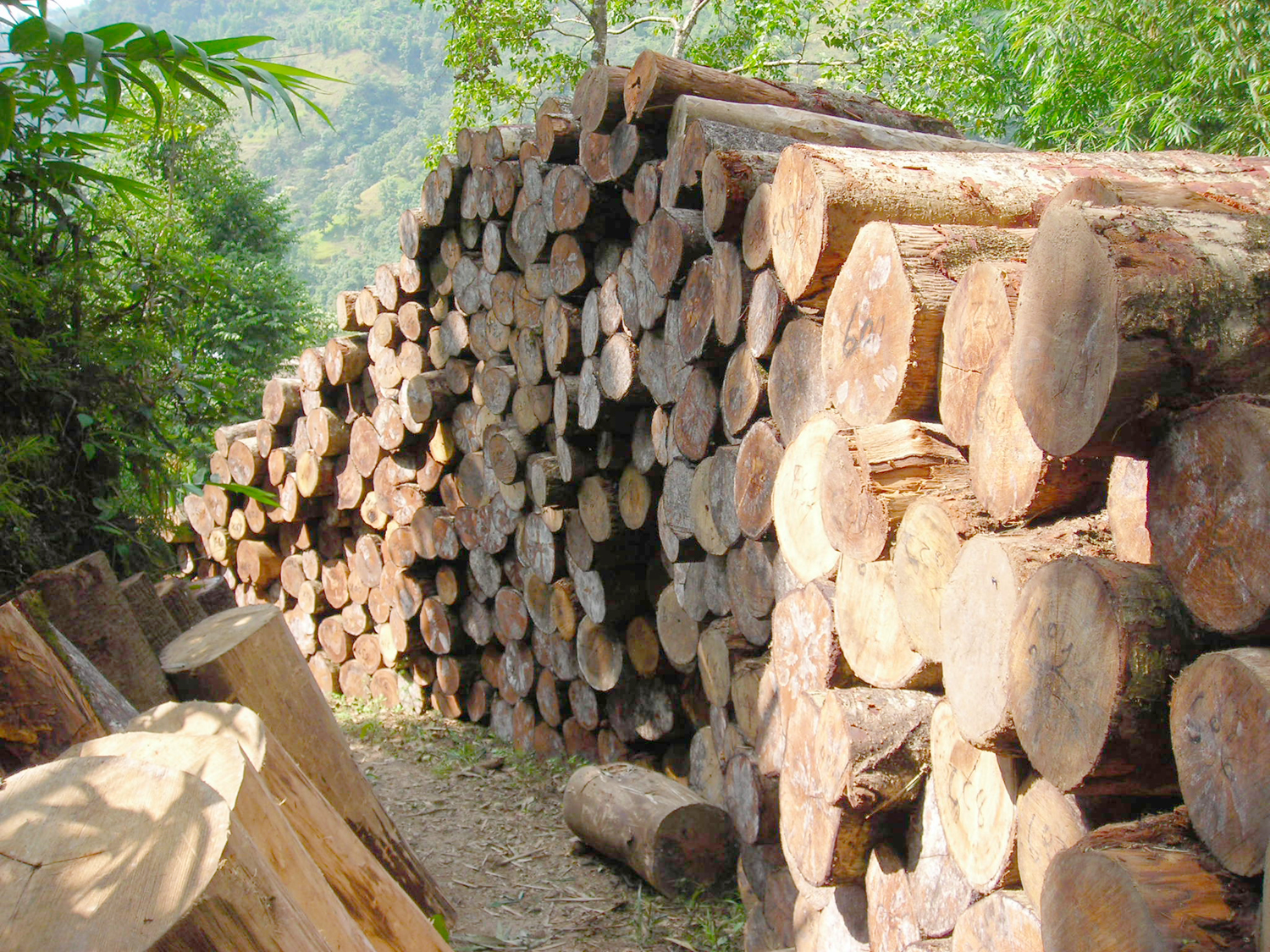
Timber logs before loading for sawmill in eastern Nepali village

Annual deforestation

Deforestation or forest clearance is the removal and destruction of a forest or stand of trees from land that is then converted to non-forest use. Deforestation can involve conversion of forest land to farms, ranches, or urban use. About 31% of Earth's land surface is covered by forests at present. This is one-third less than the forest cover before the expansion of agriculture, with half of that loss occurring in the last century. On average 2,400 trees are cut down each minute. Estimates vary widely as to the extent of deforestation in the tropics. In 2019, nearly a third of the overall tree cover loss, or 3.8 million hectares, occurred within humid tropical primary forests. These are areas of mature rainforest that are especially important for biodiversity and carbon storage.

By far, the direct cause of most deforestation is agriculture. In 2025 nearly 90% of global deforestation was caused by agriculture, with cropland expansion and pasture creation the primary drivers, this is up from more than 80% in 2012. Forests are being converted to plantations for coffee, palm oil, rubber and various other popular products. Livestock grazing also drives deforestation. Further drivers are the wood industry (logging), urbanization and mining. The effects of climate change are another cause via the increased risk of wildfires (see deforestation and climate change).

Deforestation results in habitat destruction which in turn leads to biodiversity loss. Deforestation also leads to extinction of animals and plants, changes to the local climate, and displacement of indigenous people who live in forests. Deforested regions often also suffer from other environmental problems such as desertification and soil erosion.

Another problem is that deforestation reduces the uptake of carbon dioxide (carbon sequestration) from the atmosphere. This reduces the potential of forests to assist with climate change mitigation. The role of forests in capturing and storing carbon and mitigating climate change is also important for the agricultural sector. The reason for this linkage is that the effects of climate change on agriculture pose new risks to global food systems.

Since 1990, it is estimated that some 420 million hectares of forest have been lost through conversion to other land uses, although the rate of deforestation has decreased over the past three decades. Between 2015 and 2020, the rate of deforestation was estimated at 10 million hectares per year, down from 16 million hectares per year in the 1990s. The area of primary forest worldwide has decreased by over 80 million hectares since 1990. More than 100 million hectares of forests are adversely affected by forest fires, pests, diseases, invasive species, drought and adverse weather events.

=== Controlling deforestation ===
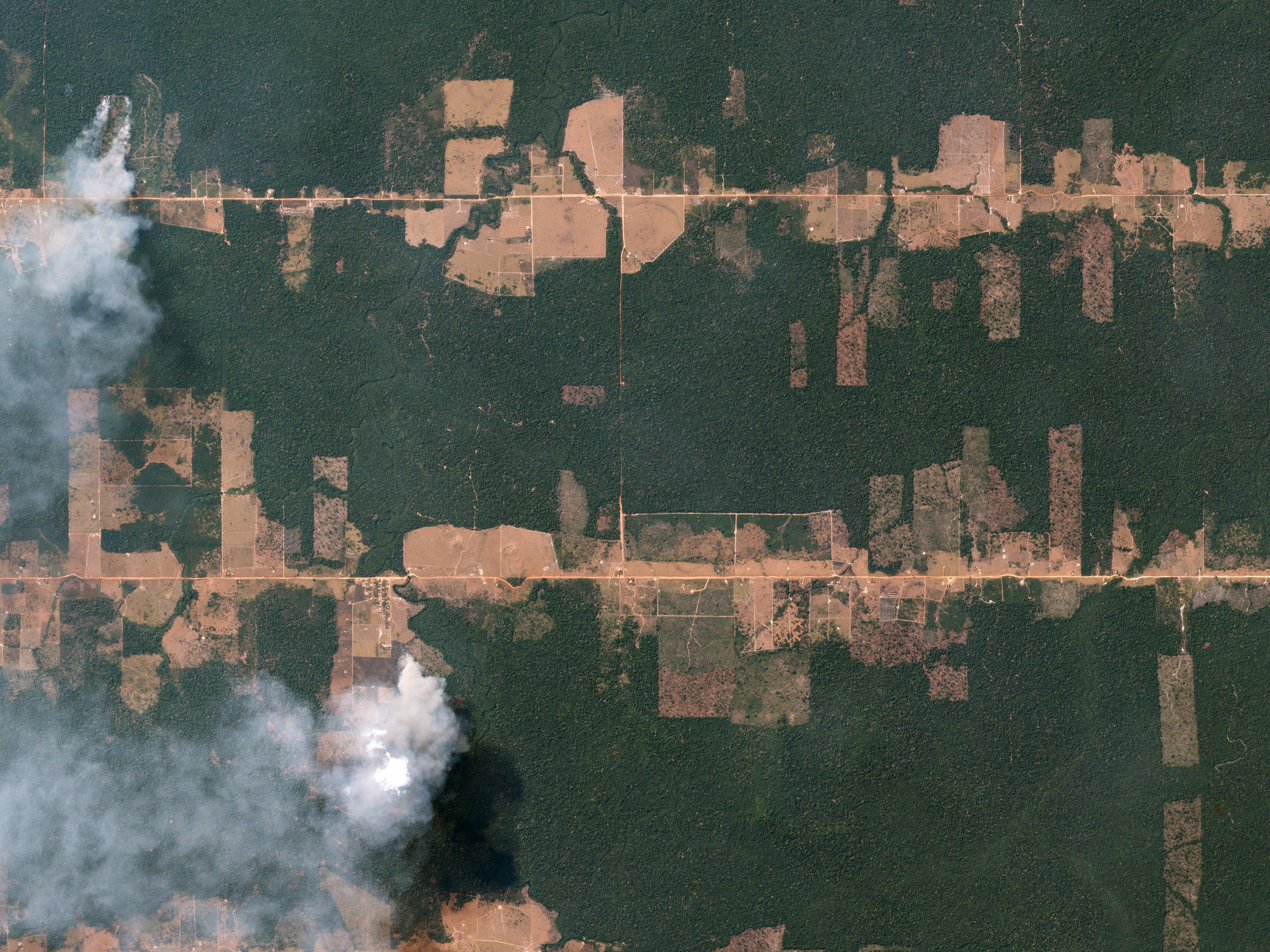
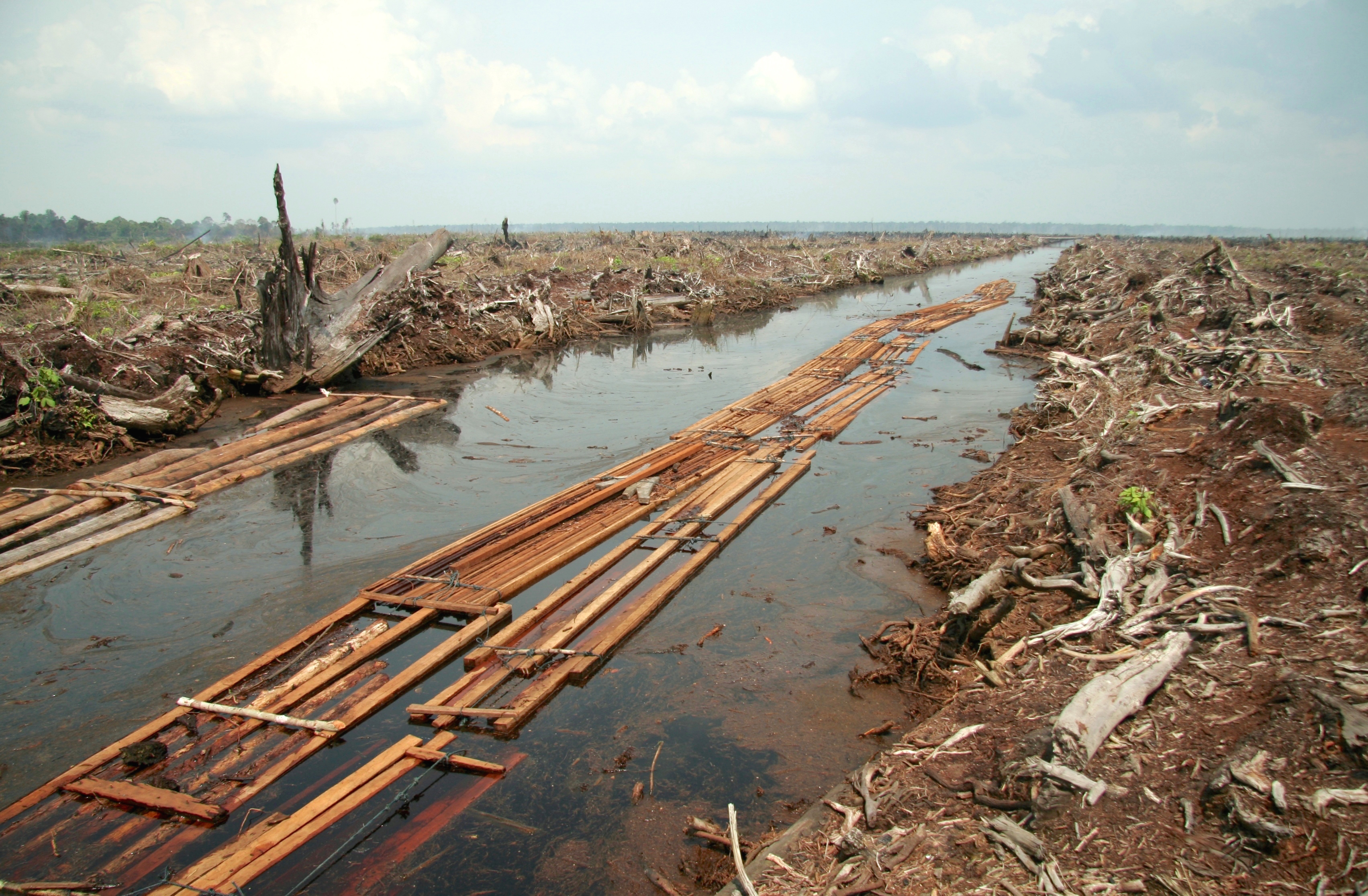
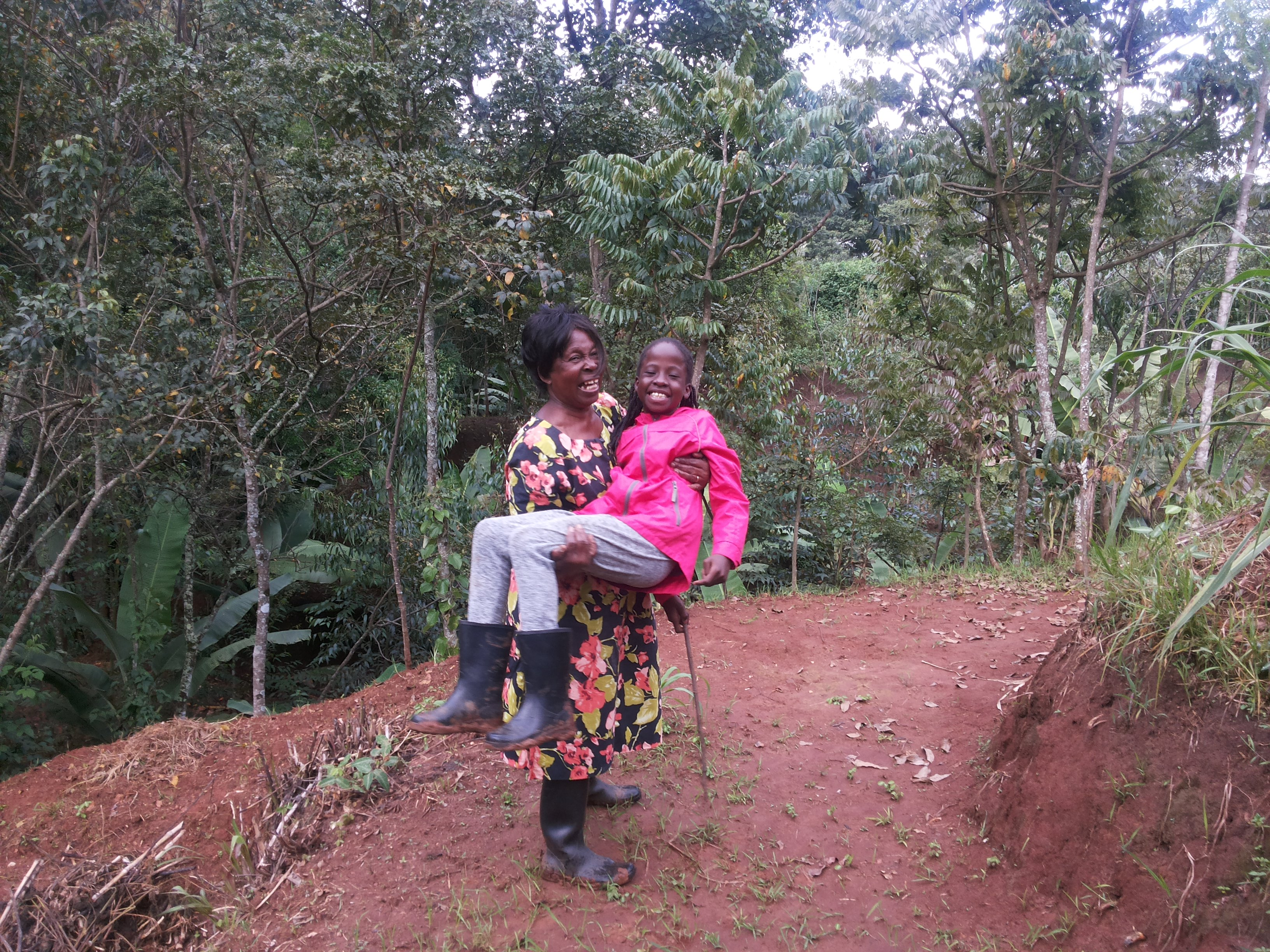
Examples of issues addressed by REDD+ in tropical forest landscapes: large-scale deforestation visible from space (top), conversion of carbon-rich peat forests for agriculture such as oil-palm (left), and community-based efforts to reduce forest degradation by creating income incentives for conservation (right).

REDD+ is a voluntary climate change mitigation framework developed under the United Nations Framework Convention on Climate Change (UNFCCC). It aims to encourage developing countries to reduce greenhouse gas emissions from deforestation and forest degradation, and to promote conservation, sustainable forest management, and enhancement of forest carbon stocks through financial incentives and policy support. The acronym is commonly expanded as "reducing emissions from deforestation and forest degradation in developing countries", and the "+" denotes the additional forest conservation and enhancement activities included in the UNFCCC scope.

UNFCCC decisions describe REDD+ as a phased approach, beginning with "readiness" activities (planning, capacity-building and institutional development), moving to implementation of national policies and measures, and evolving toward results-based actions that are fully measured, reported and verified. Countries undertaking REDD+ are expected to develop a national strategy or action plan, establish a forest reference (emission) level (FREL/FRL) as a benchmark for assessing performance, and build a national forest monitoring system to support monitoring, reporting and verification (MRV). UNFCCC decisions also include social and environmental safeguards (often referred to as the Cancún safeguards) and require countries seeking results-based payments to provide information on how safeguards are addressed and respected.

REDD+ is supported through a mix of multilateral and bilateral channels and can receive results-based finance when reported results meet UNFCCC methodological and transparency requirements under the Warsaw Framework on REDD-plus. A 2024 multi-country impact evaluation reported modest average forest outcomes and limited average welfare effects, with impacts not always sustained over time. Reviews and methodological assessments highlight uncertainties in baselines (reference levels), additionality, leakage, non-permanence and measurement capacity, especially for forest degradation and carbon pools that are harder to quantify. Criticisms and controversies also focus on governance and equity issues, including land tenure and carbon rights, benefit sharing, and the participation and consent of Indigenous peoples and local communities, alongside broader debates over the role of forest offsets in climate policy.

REDD+ remains an active part of the UNFCCC and Paris Agreement architecture. Most of the core UNFCCC decisions that define REDD+ were adopted between 2010 and 2015, including the Warsaw Framework on REDD-plus (2013). Countries continue to report REDD+ results through technical annexes to developing-country reports, including under the Paris Agreement's enhanced transparency framework via technical annexes to biennial transparency reports (BTRs). Results-based finance also continues through multilateral channels such as the Green Climate Fund's REDD+ results-based payments window.

== Overfishing ==
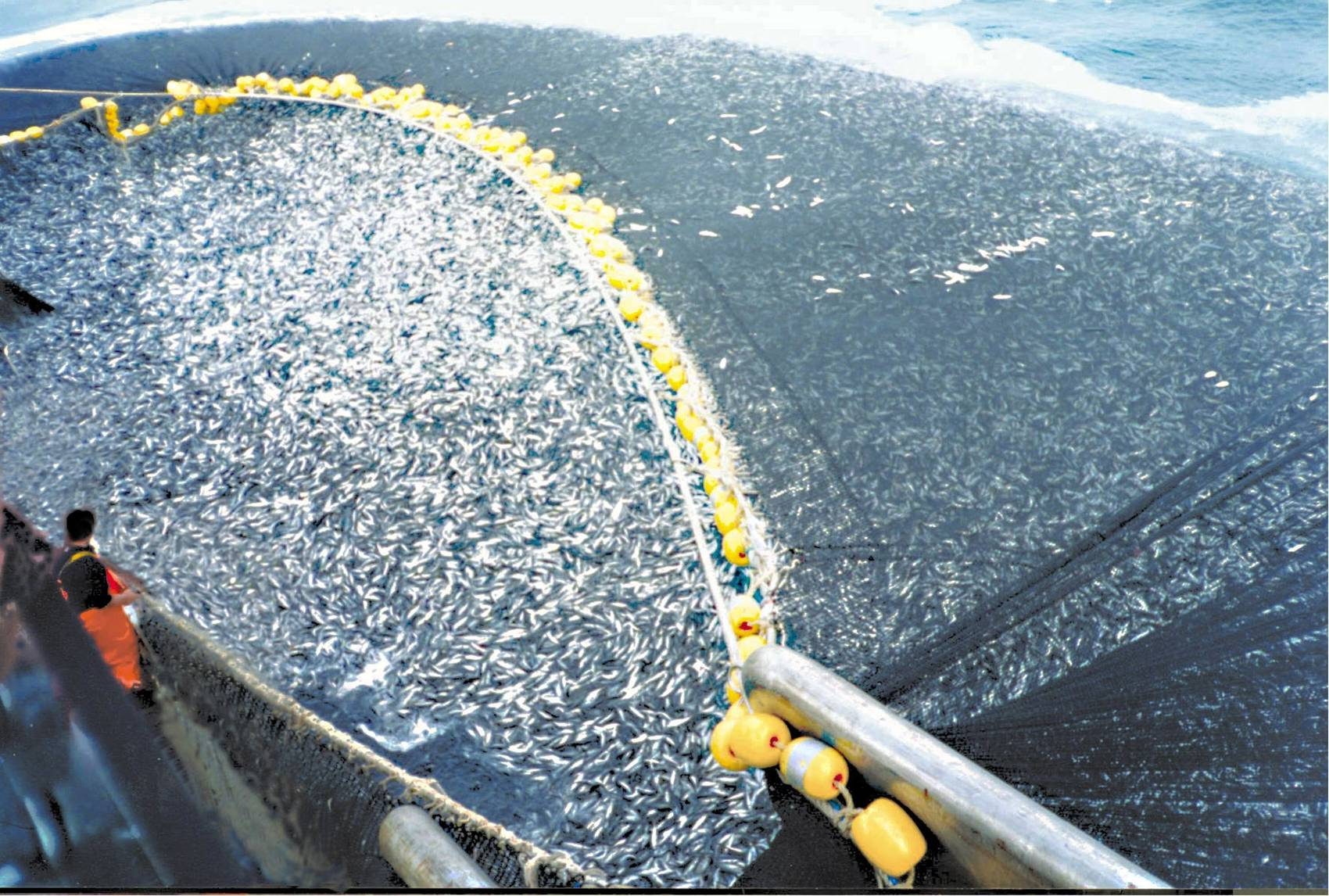
A visualization of the depletion of fish stocks through overfishing and overconsumption.

Overfishing refers to the overconsumption and/or depletion of fish populations which occurs when fish are caught at a rate that exceeds their ability to breed and replenish their population naturally. Regions particularly susceptible to overfishing include the Arctic, coastal east Africa, the Coral Triangle (located between the Pacific and Indian oceans), Central and Latin America, and the Caribbean. The depletion of fish stocks can lead to long-term negative consequences for marine ecosystems, economies, and food security. The depletion of resources hinders economic growth because growing economies leads to increased demand for natural, renewable resources like fish. Thus, when resources are depleted, it initiates a cycle of reduced resource availability, increased demand and higher prices due to scarcity, and lower economic growth. Overfishing can lead to habitat and biodiversity loss, through specifically habitat degradation, which has an immense impact on marine/aquatic ecosystems. Habitat loss refers to when a natural habitat cannot sustain/support the species that live in it, and biodiversity loss refers to when there is a decrease in the population of a species in a specific area and/or the extinction of a species. Habitat degradation is caused by the depletion of resources, in which human activities are the primary driving force. One major impact that the depletion of fish stocks causes is a dynamic change and erosion to marine food webs, which can ultimately lead to ecosystem collapse because of the imbalance created for other marine species. Overfishing also causes instability in marine ecosystems because these ecosystems are less biodiverse and more fragile. This occurs mainly because, due to overfishing, many fish species are unable to naturally sustain their populations in these damaged ecosystems. Common causes of overfishing include:

- Increasing consumption: According to the United Nations Food and Agriculture Organization (FAO), aquatic foods like fish significantly contribute to food security and initiatives to end worldwide hunger. However, global consumption of aquatic foods has increased at twice the rate of population growth since the 1960s, significantly contributing to the depletion of fish stocks.
- Climate change: Due to climate change and the sudden increasing temperatures of our oceans, fish stocks and other marine life are being negatively impacted. These changes force fish stocks to change their migratory routes, and without a reduction in fishing, this leads to overfishing and depletion because the same amount of fish are being caught in areas that now have lower fish populations.
- Illegal, unreported, and unregulated (IUU) fishing: Illegal fishing involves conducting fishing operations that break the laws and regulations at the regional and international levels around fishing, including fishing without a license or permit, fishing in protected areas, and/or catching protected species of fish. Unreported fishing involves conducting fishing operation which are not reported, or are misreported to authorities according to the International and Regional Fisheries Management Organizations (RFMOs). Unregulated fishing involves conducting fishing operations in areas which do not have conservation measures put in place, and cannot be effectively monitored because of the lack of regulations.
- Fisheries subsidies: A subsidy is financial assistance paid by the government to support a particular activity, industry, or group. Subsidies are often provided to reduce start up costs, stimulate production, or encourage consumption. In the case of fisheries subsidies, it enables fishing fleets to catch more fish by fishing further out in a body of water, and fish for longer periods of time.

== Wetlands ==
Wetlands are ecosystems that are often saturated by enough surface or groundwater to sustain vegetation that is usually adapted to saturated soil conditions, such as cattails, bulrushes, red maples, wild rice, blackberries, cranberries, and peat moss. Because some varieties of wetlands are rich in minerals and nutrients and provide many of the advantages of both land and water environments, they contain diverse species and provide a distinct basis for the food chain. Wetland habitats contribute to environmental health and biodiversity. Wetlands are a nonrenewable resource on a human timescale and in some environments cannot ever be renewed. Recent studies indicate that global loss of wetlands could be as high as 87% since 1700 AD, with 64% of wetland loss occurring since 1900. Some loss of wetlands resulted from natural causes such as erosion, sedimentation, subsidence, and a rise in the sea level.

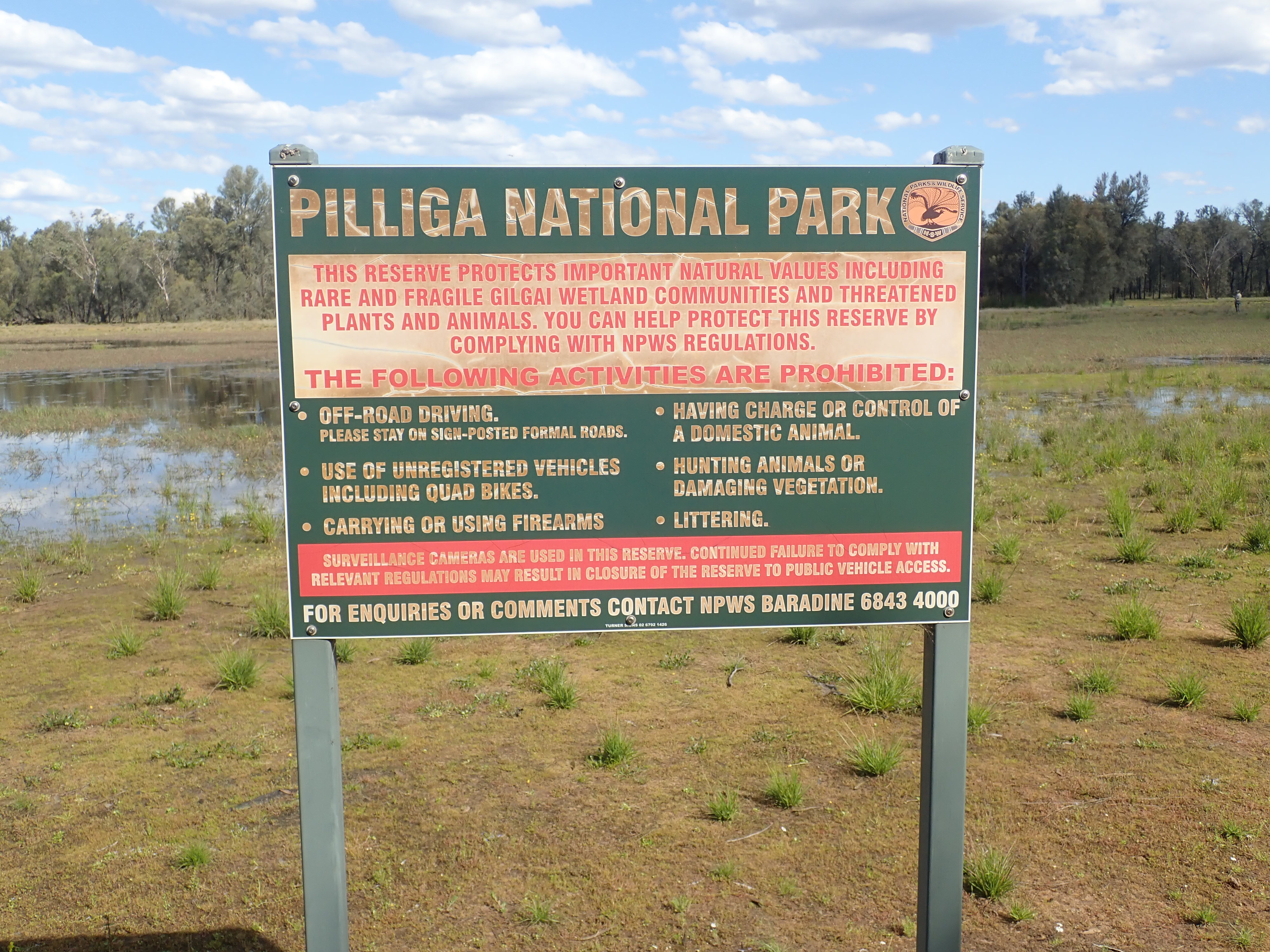
Sign at a wetland in Pilliga National Park which is trying to reduce resource depletion and wetland degradation through prohibiting certain activities.

Wetlands provide environmental services for:

1. Food and habitat
2. Improving water quality
3. Commercial fishing
4. Floodwater reduction
5. Shoreline stabilization
6. Recreation

=== Resources in wetlands ===
Some of the world's most successful agricultural areas are wetlands that have been drained and converted to farmland for large-scale agriculture. Large-scale draining of wetlands also occurs for real estate development and urbanization. In contrast, in some cases wetlands are also flooded to be converted to recreational lakes or hydropower generation. In some countries ranchers have also moved their property onto wetlands for grazing due to the nutrient rich vegetation. Wetlands in Southern America also prove a fruitful resource for poachers, as animals with valuable hides such as jaguars, maned wolves, caimans, and snakes are drawn to wetlands. The effect of the removal of large predators is still unknown in South African wetlands.

Humans benefit from wetlands in indirect ways as well. Wetlands act as natural water filters, when runoff from either natural or man-made processes pass through, wetlands can have a neutralizing effect. If a wetland is in between an agricultural zone and a freshwater ecosystem, fertilizer runoff will be absorbed by the wetland and used to fuel the slow processes that occur happen, by the time the water reaches the freshwater ecosystem there will not be enough fertilizer to cause destructive algal blooms that poison freshwater ecosystems.

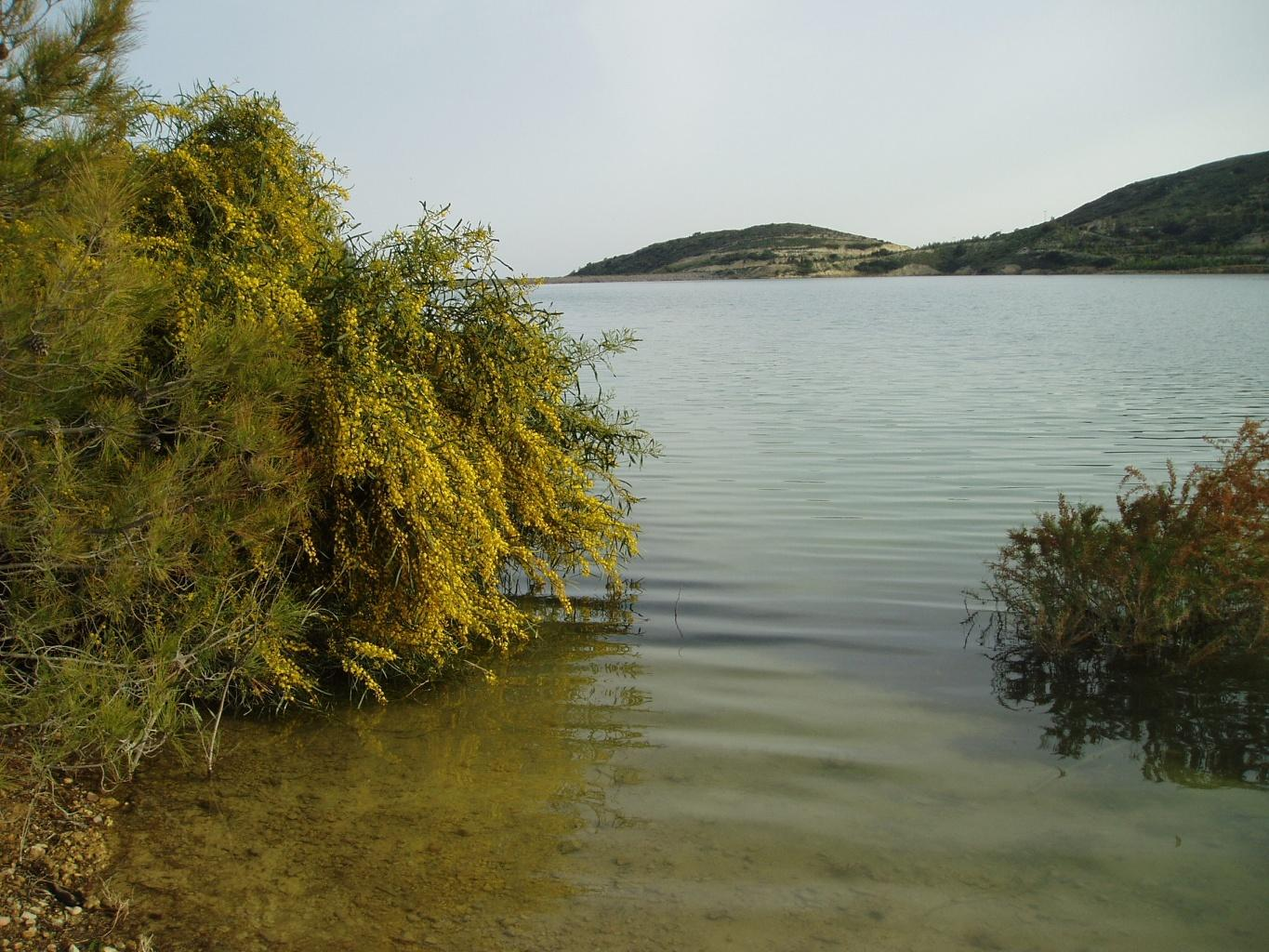
Bramiana Wetlands

=== Non-natural causes of wetland degradation ===
- Hydrologic alteration
  - drainage
  - dredging
  - stream channelization
  - ditching
  - levees
  - deposition of fill material
  - stream diversion
  - groundwater drainage
  - impoundment
- Urbanization and urban development
- Marinas/boats
- Industrialization and industrial development
- Agriculture
- Silviculture/Timber harvest
- Mining
- Atmospheric deposition

To preserve the resources extracted from wetlands, current strategies are to rank wetlands and prioritize the conservation of wetlands with more environmental services, create more efficient irrigation for wetlands being used for agriculture, and restricting access to wetlands by tourists.

== Groundwater ==
Groundwater flow paths vary greatly in length, depth and travel time from points of recharge to points of discharge in the groundwater system.

Water is an essential resource needed for survival. Water access has a profound influence on a society's prosperity and success. Groundwater is water that is in saturated zones underground, the upper surface of the saturated zone is called the water table. Groundwater is held in the pores and fractures of underground materials like sand, gravel and other rock, these rock materials are called aquifers. Groundwater can either flow naturally out of rock materials or can be pumped out. Groundwater supplies wells and aquifers for private, agricultural, and public use and is used by more than a third of the world's population every day for their drinking water. Globally there is 22.6 million cubic kilometers of groundwater available; of this, only 0.35 million of that is renewable.

=== Groundwater as a non-renewable resource ===
Groundwater is considered to be a non-renewable resource because less than six percent of the water around the world is replenished and renewed on a human timescale of 50 years. People are already using non-renewable water that is thousands of years old, in areas like Egypt they are using water that may have been renewed a million years ago which is not renewable on human timescales. Of the groundwater used for agriculture, 16–33% is non-renewable. It is estimated that since the 1960s groundwater extraction has more than doubled, which has increased groundwater depletion. Due to this increase in depletion, in some of the most depleted areas use of groundwater for irrigation has become impossible or cost prohibitive.

=== Environmental impacts ===
Overusing groundwater, old or young, can lower subsurface water levels and dry up streams, which could have a huge effect on ecosystems on the surface. When the most easily recoverable fresh groundwater is removed this leaves a residual with inferior water quality. This is in part from induced leakage from the land surface, confining layers or adjacent aquifers that contain saline or contaminated water. Worldwide the magnitude of groundwater depletion from storage may be so large as to constitute a measurable contributor to sea-level rise.

=== Mitigation ===
Currently, societies respond to water-resource depletion by shifting management objectives from location and developing new supplies to augmenting conserving and reallocation of existing supplies. There are two different perspectives to groundwater depletion, the first is that depletion is considered literally and simply as a reduction in the volume of water in the saturated zone, regardless of water quality considerations. A second perspective views depletion as a reduction in the usable volume of fresh groundwater in storage.

Augmenting supplies can mean improving water quality or increasing water quantity. Depletion due to quality considerations can be overcome by treatment, whereas large volume metric depletion can only be alleviated by decreasing discharge or increasing recharge. Artificial recharge of storm flow and treated municipal wastewater, has successfully reversed groundwater declines. In the future improved infiltration and recharge technologies will be more widely used to maximize the capture of runoff and treated wastewater.

== Resource depletion and the future ==
=== Earth Overshoot Day ===
Earth Overshoot Day (EOD) is the date when humanity's demand for ecological resources exceeds Earth's ability to regenerate these resources in a given year. EOD is calculated by the Global Footprint Network, and organization that develops annual impact reports, based on data bout resource use in the previous year. EOD is announced each year on June 5, which is World Environment Day, and continues to get earlier each year. For example, Earth Overshoot Day 2023 was August 2, compared to in 2010 where it fell on August 10 and in 2000 where it fell on September 17. The Global Footprint Network calculates Earth Overshoot Day by dividing world biocapacity by world ecological footprint and multiplying that by 365 days (366 days during a leap year). World biocapacity refers to the total amount of natural resources that Earth can regenerate in a year. World ecological footprint refers to the total amount of resource that society consumes in a year, including things like energy, food, water, agricultural land, forest land, etc. Earth Overshoot Day can be calculated for Earth as a whole, but also for each country individually. For example, in a middle income country like Morocco, their 2023 country specific overshoot day was December 22, compared to a high income country like the United States of America which consumes a lot more resources, their 2023 country specific overshoot day was March 14. The goal is to push Earth Overshoot Day back far enough to where humanity would be living within Earth's ecological means and not surpassing what it can sustainably provide each year.

=== The World Counts ===
According to The World Counts, a source which collects data from a number of organizations, research institutes, and news services, and produces statistical countdown clocks that illustrate the negative trends related to the environment and other global challenges, humanity is in trouble if current consumption patterns continue. At society's current consumption rate, approximately 1.8 Earths are needed in order to provide resources in a sustainable capacity, and there is just under 26 years until resources are depleted to a point where Earth's capacity to support life may collapse. It is also estimated that approximately 29% of all species on Earth are currently at risk of extinction. As well, 25 billion tons of resources have been extracted this year alone, this includes but is not limited to natural resources like fish, wood, metals, minerals, water, and energy. The World Counts shows that there is 15 years until Earth is exhausted of freshwater, and 23 years until there are no more fish in the oceans. They also estimate that 15 billion trees are cut down every year, while only 2 billion trees are planted every year, and that there is only 75 years until rainforests are completely gone.

== Resource scarcity as a moral problem ==
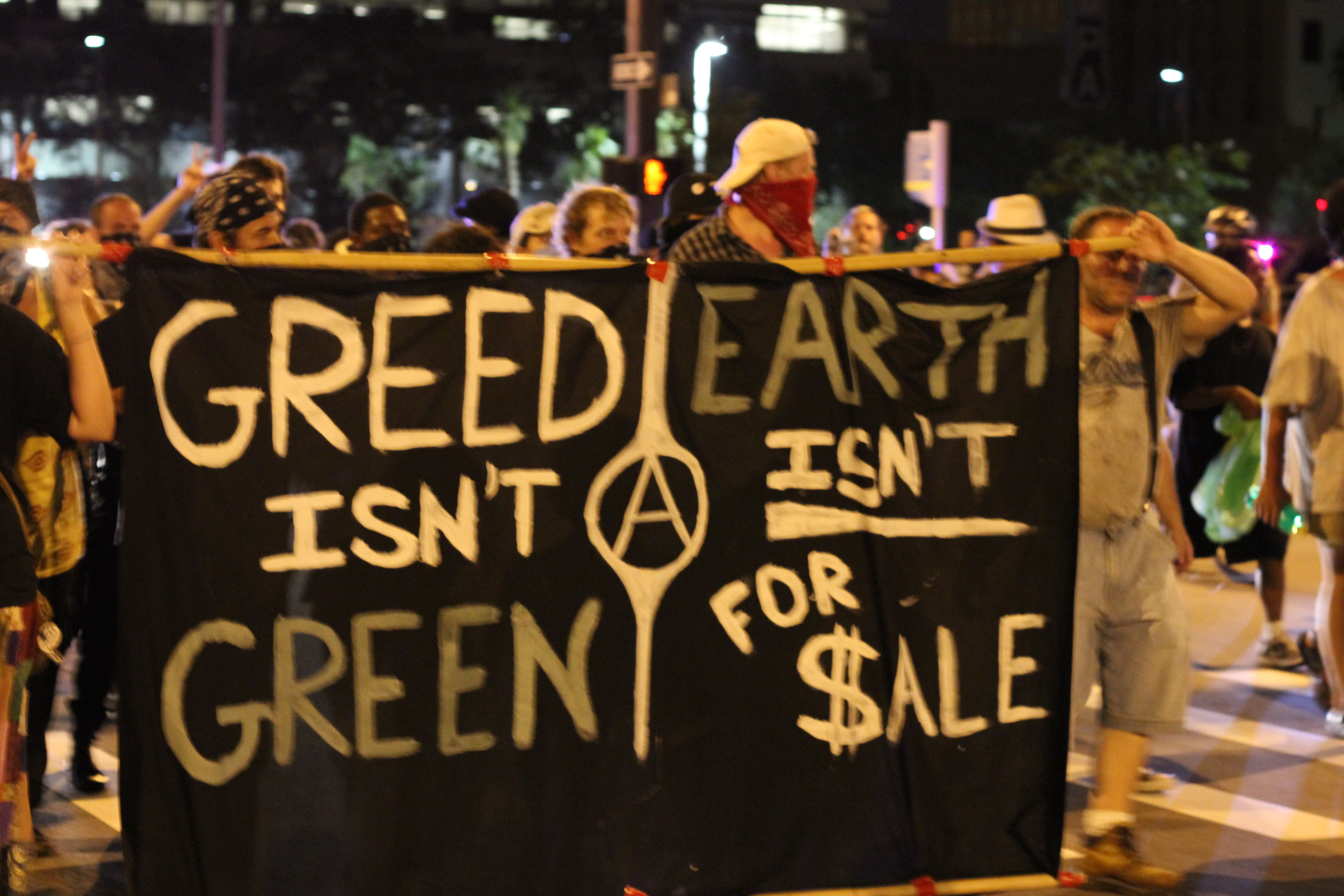
Protestors carry sign stating "Greed isn't green, Earth is not for sale" against resource depletion and climate change

Researchers who produced an update of the Club of Rome's Limits to Growth report find that many people deny the existence of the problem of scarcity, including many leading scientists and politicians. This may be due, for example, to an unwillingness to change one's own consumption patterns or to share scarce natural resources more equally, or to a psychological defence mechanism.

The scarcity of resources raises a central moral problem concerning the distribution and allocation of natural resources. Competition means that the most advanced get the most resources, which often means the developed West. The problem here is that the West has developed partly through colonial slave labour and violence, and partly through protectionist policies, which together have left many other, non-Western countries underdeveloped.

In the future, international cooperation in sharing scarce resources will become increasingly important. Where scarcity is concentrated on the non-renewable resources that play the most important role in meeting needs, the most essential element for the realisation of human rights is an adequate and equitable allocation of scarcity. Inequality, taken to its extreme, causes intense discontent, which can lead to social unrest and even armed conflict. Many experts believe that ensuring equitable development is the only sure way to a peaceful distribution of scarcity.

Another approach to resource depletion is a combined process of de-resourcification and resourcification. Where one strives to put an end to the social processes of turning unsustainable things into resources, for example, non-renewable natural resources, and the other strives to instead develop processes of turning sustainable things into resources, for example, renewable human resources.

== See also ==
- Asteroid mining
- Automated mining
- Environmental effects of mining
- Environmental impact assessment
- Mining law
- Natural resource
- Ecological economics
- Holocene extinction
- Jevons paradox
- Malthusianism
- Overexploitation
- Overfishing
- Overpopulation
- Peak coal
- Peak gas
- Peak gold
- Peak oil
- Peak water
- Planetary boundaries
- Progress trap
- Resource war
