= Subsidy =

Financial support to an economic sector

A subsidy, subvention or government incentive is a type of government expenditure which redistributes from tax payers to individuals, households, or businesses. Subsidies take various forms, such as direct government expenditures, tax incentives, soft loans, price support, and government provision of goods and services. For instance, the government may distribute direct payment subsidies to individuals and households during an economic downturn in order to help its citizens pay their bills and to stimulate economic activity.

Although commonly extended from the government, the term subsidy can relate to any type of support – for example from NGOs, or international organizations. Subsidies come in various forms including: direct (cash grants, interest-free loans) and indirect (tax breaks, insurance, low-interest loans, accelerated depreciation, rent rebates). Furthermore, they can be broad or narrow, legal or illegal, ethical or unethical. The most common forms of subsidies are those to the producer or the consumer.

All countries use subsidies via national and sub-national entities through different forms such as tax incentives and direct grants. Likewise, subsidies have an economic influence on both a domestic and international level. On a domestic level, subsidies affect the allocation decision of domestic resources, income distribution, and expenditure productivity. On an international level, subsidies may increase or decrease international interaction and integration through trade.

Generally, subsidies can take up a substantial portion of government expenditure. Among OECD countries in 2020, the median value of subsidies and other transfers such as social benefits and non-repayable transfers to private and public enterprises was 56.3 percent of total government expenses which was 34.9 percent (weighted average) of GDP in the same year. The number of subsidies in force have been rapidly increasing since 2008.

== Types ==
=== Production/supply subsidy ===
A production subsidy encourages suppliers to increase the output of a particular product by partially offsetting the production costs or losses. The objective of production subsidies is to expand production of a particular product more so that the market would promote but without raising the final price to consumers. This type of subsidy is predominantly found in developed markets. Other examples of production subsidies include the assistance in the creation of a new firm (Enterprise Investment Scheme), industry (industrial policy) and even the development of certain areas (regional policy). Production subsidies are critically discussed in the literature as they can cause many problems including the additional cost of storing the extra produced products, depressing world market prices, and incentivizing producers to over-produce, for example, a farmer overproducing in terms of his land's carrying capacity.

=== Consumption/demand subsidy ===
A consumption subsidy is one that subsidizes the behavior of consumers. This type of subsidies are most common in developing countries where governments subsidise such things as food, water, electricity and education on the basis that no matter how impoverished, all should be allowed those most basic requirements. For example, some governments offer "lifeline" rates for electricity, that is, the first increment of electricity each month is subsidized. Evidence from recent studies suggests that government expenditures on subsidies remain high in many countries, often amounting to several percentage points of GDP. Subsidization on such a scale implies substantial opportunity costs. There are at least three compelling reasons for studying government subsidy behavior. First, subsidies are a major instrument of government expenditure policy. Second, on a domestic level, subsidies affect domestic resource allocation decisions, income distribution, and expenditure productivity. A consumer subsidy is a shift in demand as the subsidy is given directly to consumers.

=== Export subsidy ===
An export subsidy is a support from the government for products that are exported, as a means of assisting the country's balance of payments. Usha Haley and George Haley identified the subsidies to manufacturing industry provided by the Chinese government and how they have altered trade patterns. Traditionally, economists have argued that subsidies benefit consumers but hurt the subsidizing countries. Haley and Haley provided data to show that over the decade after China joined the World Trade Organization industrial subsidies have helped give China an advantage in industries in which they previously enjoyed no comparative advantage such as the steel, glass, paper, auto parts, and solar industries. China's shores have also collapsed from overfishing and industrialization, which is why the Chinese government heavily subsidizes its fishermen, who sail the world in search of new grounds.

Export subsidy is known for being abused. For example, some exporters substantially over declare the value of their goods so as to benefit more from the export subsidy. Another method is to export a batch of goods to a foreign country but the same goods will be re-imported by the same trader via a circuitous route and changing the product description so as to obscure their origin. Thus the trader benefits from the export subsidy without creating real trade value to the economy. Export subsidy as such can become a self-defeating and disruptive policy.

Adam Smith observed that special government subsidies enabled exporters to sell abroad at substantial ongoing losses. He did not regard that as a sound and sustainable policy. That was because "… under normal industrial-commercial conditions their own interests soon oblige loss-making businesses to deploy their capital in other ways – or to move into markets where the sales prices do cover the supply costs and yield ordinary profits. Like other mercantilist schemes and devices, export bounties are a means of trying to force business capital into channels it would not naturally enter. The schemes are invariably costly and damaging in various ways."

=== Import subsidy ===
An import subsidy is support from the government for products that are imported. Rarer than an export subsidy, an import subsidy further reduces the price to consumers for imported goods. Import subsidies have various effects depending on the subject. For example, consumers in the importing country are better off and experience an increase in consumer welfare due to the decrease in price of the imported goods, as well as the decrease in price of the domestic substitute goods. Conversely, the consumers in the exporting country experience a decrease in consumer welfare due to an increase in the price of their domestic goods. Furthermore, producers of the importing country experience a loss of welfare due to a decrease in the price for the goods in their market, while on the other side, the exporters of the producing country experience an increase in well-being due to the increase in demand. Ultimately, the import subsidy is rarely used due to an overall loss of welfare for the country due to a decrease in domestic production and a reduction in production throughout the world. However, that can result in a redistribution of income.

=== Employment subsidy ===
Employment or wage subsidies keep the employment relationship ongoing even during financial crisis. It is particularly beneficial for enterprises to recover quickly after a temporary suspension following a crisis. Workers are prevented from losing their jobs and other associated employment benefits such as annual leave entitlements and retirement pensions.

Employment subsidies allow individual beneficiaries a minimum standard of living at the very least. However, less than half of active jobseekers in around 50% of OECD countries receive unemployment support. The effect of employment subsidies may not be evident immediately. When employers received grants to subside a substantial part of the wages for retaining their employees or to create new jobs during severe recessions such as the Great Recession, there were minor impacts on employment during the first year. However, the subsidy began to yield positive effects on employment, particularly a decrease in the unemployment rate, in the second year as employers began to properly utilise the subsidy.

=== Tax subsidy ===
Tax subsidies, also known as tax breaks or tax expenditures, are a way for governments to achieve certain outcomes without directly providing cash payments. By offering tax breaks, the government can incentivize behavior that is beneficial to the economy or society as a whole. Tax subsidies can also have negative consequences.

One type of tax subsidy is a health tax deduction, which allows individuals or businesses to deduct their health expenses from their taxable income. This can be seen as a way to incentivize people to prioritize their health and well-being. However, it can also create distortions in the economy by encouraging people to spend more on health care than they otherwise would.

Another type of tax subsidy is related to Intellectual Property. Base Erosion and Profit Shifting (BEPS) is a particular form of tax subsidy that involves companies shifting their profits to low-tax jurisdictions in order to reduce their overall tax burden. The Multilateral Convention to Implement Tax Treaty Related Measures to Prevent Base Erosion and Profit Shifting is a treaty signed by half the nations of the world aimed at preventing this type of tax avoidance.

While tax subsidies can be effective in achieving certain outcomes, they are also less transparent than direct cash payments and can be difficult to undo. Some argue that tax breaks disproportionately benefit the wealthy and large corporations, further exacerbating income inequality. Therefore, it is important for governments to carefully consider the potential consequences of offering tax subsidies and ensure that they are targeted towards achieving the greatest public good.

Tax subsidies can have unintended consequences, such as creating market distortions that favor certain industries or companies over others. For example, if a government offers tax breaks to incentivize investment in renewable energy, it may lead to a glut of renewable energy projects and an oversupply of energy in the market. This, in turn, can lead to lower prices for energy and financial losses for investors.

Tax subsidies can be difficult to monitor and enforce, which can lead to abuse and fraud. Companies may claim tax breaks for activities that do not qualify, or may use complex legal structures to shift profits to lower tax jurisdictions. This can result in lost revenue for governments and a lack of fairness in the tax system.

Despite these concerns, tax subsidies remain a popular tool for governments to promote various policy objectives, such as economic growth, job creation, and environmental sustainability. The use of tax subsidies is often debated in political circles, with some arguing that they are necessary to support certain industries or to incentivize certain behaviors, while others argue that they create inefficiencies and distortions in the economy.

In conclusion, tax subsidies are a powerful tool for governments to achieve policy goals, but they come with their own set of challenges and limitations. It is important for policymakers to carefully consider the potential unintended consequences of tax subsidies and to design them in a way that maximizes their benefits while minimizing their costs. Additionally, strong monitoring and enforcement mechanisms are needed to ensure that tax subsidies are used appropriately and do not result in abuse or fraud.

=== Transport subsidies ===
Some governments subsidise transport, especially rail and bus transport, which decrease congestion and pollution compared to cars. In the EU, rail subsidies are around €73 billion, and Chinese subsidies reach $130 billion.

Publicly owned airports can be an indirect subsidy if they lose money. The European Union, for instance, criticizes Germany for its high number of money-losing airports that are used primarily by low cost carriers, characterizing the arrangement as an illegal subsidy.

In many countries, roads and highways are paid for through general revenue, rather than tolls or other dedicated sources that are paid only by road users, creating an indirect subsidy for road transportation. The fact that long-distance buses in Germany do not pay tolls has been called an indirect subsidy by critics, who point to track access charges for railways.

=== Energy subsidies ===
Energy subsidies are measures that keep prices for customers below market levels, or for suppliers above market levels, or reduce costs for customers and suppliers. Energy subsidies may be direct cash transfers to suppliers, customers, or related bodies, as well as indirect support mechanisms, such as tax exemptions and rebates, price controls, trade restrictions, and limits on market access.

During FY 2016–22, most US federal subsidies were for renewable energy producers (primarily biofuels, wind, and solar), low-income households, and energy-efficiency improvements. During FY 2016–22, nearly half (46%) of federal energy subsidies were associated with renewable energy, and 35% were associated with energy end uses. Federal support for renewable energy of all types more than doubled, from $7.4 billion in FY 2016 to $15.6 billion in FY 2022.

The International Renewable Energy Agency tracked some $634 billion in energy-sector subsidies in 2020, and found that around 70% were fossil fuel subsidies. About 20% went to renewable power generation, 6% to biofuels and just over 3% to nuclear.

==== Fossil fuels ====
Fossil fuel subsidies per capita

Fossil fuel subsidies as share of GDP

Fossil fuel subsidies are energy subsidies on fossil fuels. Under a narrow definition, fossil fuel subsidies totalled around $725 billion (0.6% of global GDP) to $900 billion in 2024. Under a more expansive definition, they totalled $6.7 trillion (5.8% of GDP). Most subsidy is for oil and natural gas. Subsidies are mainly on consumption, such as a lower sales tax on natural gas for residential heating; or subsidies on production, such as tax breaks on exploration for oil. Or they may be free or cheap negative externalities; such as air pollution or climate change due to burning gasoline, diesel and jet fuel. Some fossil fuel subsidies are via electricity generation, such as subsidies for coal-fired power stations.

Eliminating fossil fuel subsidies would reduce the health risks of air pollution, and would greatly reduce global carbon emissions thus helping to limit climate change. As of 2021, policy researchers estimate that substantially more money is spent on fossil fuel subsidies than on environmentally harmful agricultural subsidies or environmentally harmful water subsidies. The International Energy Agency says: "High fossil fuel prices hit the poor hardest, but subsidies are rarely well-targeted to protect vulnerable groups and tend to benefit better-off segments of the population."

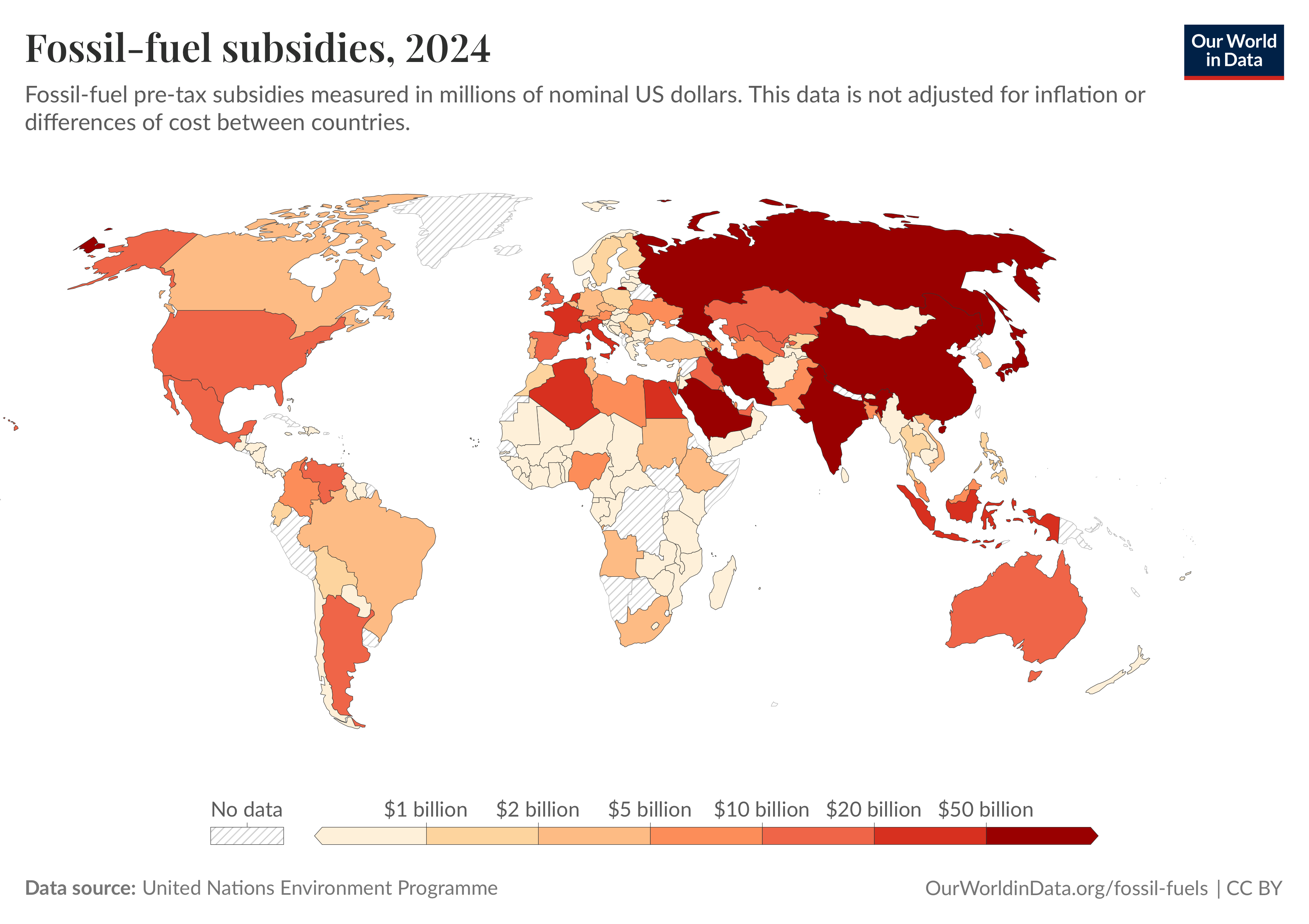
Fossil-fuel subsidies

Despite the G20 countries having pledged to phase-out inefficient fossil fuel subsidies, they continue because of voter demand, or for energy security. However the International Institute for Sustainable Development says that, done carefully, phasing-out fossil fuel subsidies would increase energy security.

=== Housing subsidies ===
Housing subsidies are designed to promote the construction industry and homeownership. As of 2018, U.S housing subsidies total around $15 billion per year. Housing subsidies can come in two types; assistance with down payment and interest rate subsidies. The deduction of mortgage interest from the federal income tax accounts for the largest interest rate subsidy. Additionally, the federal government will help low-income families with the down payment, coming to $10.9 million in 2008.

As a housing policy tool, housing subsidies also help low income individuals gain and maintain liveable residency by easing the cost burdens of housing for low income individuals and households. However, some policy makers and experts believe they are costly to implement and may even reduce incentives for beneficiaries to participate in the labour market. In the contrary, certain literatures have found that subsidy cuts do not encourage employment or participation among beneficiaries. For example, research by Daniel Borbely found that reducing housing subsidies did not increase employment and labour force participation. Though, he also added that claimants relocated to other areas of the rental market to maintain their benefits.

Nonetheless, the most common method for providing housing subsidies is via direct payments to renters by covering a part of their rent on the private rent market. This method of direct transfer of housing subsidies is often referred to as "housing vouchers". In the United States, the so-called Section 8 is a direct payment program subsidising the largest amount of money to renters for rental assistance.

== Categorising subsidies ==
=== Direct and indirect ===
The first important classification of subsidies are direct and indirect subsidies. Subsidies are categorised as direct when it involves actual cash outlays targeted towards a specified individual or household. Popular examples includes cash grants and interest-free loans. Subsidies can also be classified as indirect when they do not involve actual payments. An example would be an increase in disposable income arising from a decrease in price of an essential good or service that the government has enforced in a form of monetary support. In contrast, a decrease in the price of a good or service may lead to an increase in revenue for producers earned from the heightened demand by consumers.

The use of indirect subsidies such as price controls is widespread among developing economies and emerging markets as a necessary tool for social policy. It has proven to be effective in many cases but price controls have a potential to dampen investment activity and growth, cause heavy fiscal burdens for the government, and may even complicate the optimal performance of monetary policy. To prevent the undesirable negative effects, price control regimes may be replaced by creating social safety nets and proposing sound reforms to encourage competition and growth.

=== Production and consumption ===
Another important classification of subsidies are producer/production subsidies and consumer/consumption subsidies. Production subsidies are designed to ensure producers are advantaged by creating fluid market activity through other market control mechanisms or by providing cash payments for factors of production. Consumption subsidies benefit consumers typically through a reduction in the market price of goods and services. They are commonly used by governments of many developing countries in an attempt to secure the most basic needs for its population.

=== Broad and narrow ===
These various subsidies can be divided into broad and narrow. Narrow subsidies are those monetary transfers that are easily identifiable and have a clear intent. They are commonly characterised by a monetary transfer between governments and institutions or businesses and individuals. A classic example is a government payment to a farmer.

=== Monetary and non-monetary ===
Conversely broad subsidies include both monetary and non-monetary subsidies and is often difficult to identify. A broad subsidy is less attributable and less transparent. Environmental externalities are the most common type of broad subsidy.

== Economic effects ==
Subsidy of demand tends to increase prices.

Competitive equilibrium is a state of balance between supply and demand, in which the quantity demanded of a good is the quantity supplied at a specified price. When the price falls the quantity demand exceeds the equilibrium quantity, conversely, a reduction in the supply of a good beyond equilibrium quantity implies an increase in the price. The effect of a subsidy is to shift the supply or demand curve to the right (i.e. increases the supply or demand) by the amount of the subsidy. A demand subsidy tends to increase prices, while supply subsidy can reduce the subsidized prices.

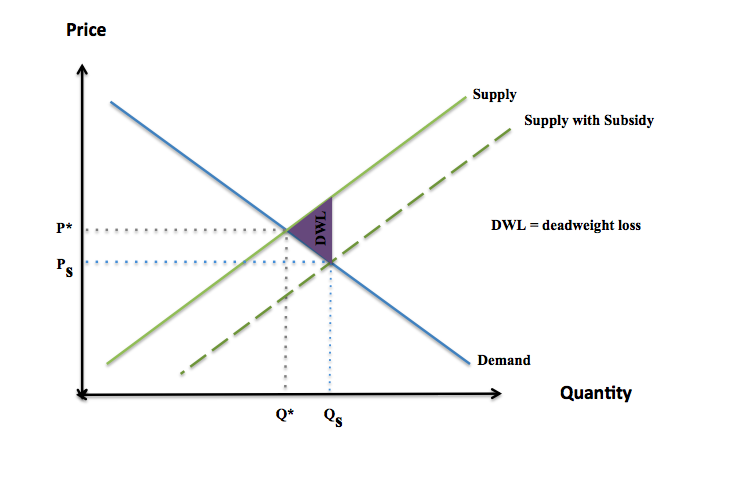
Subsidy of supply can decrease the subsidized price at cost of a deadweight loss.

Assuming the market is in a perfectly competitive equilibrium, a subsidy increases the supply of the good beyond the equilibrium competitive quantity. The imbalance creates deadweight loss. Deadweight loss from a subsidy is the amount by which the cost of the subsidy exceeds the gains of the subsidy. The magnitude of the deadweight loss is dependent on the size of the subsidy. This is considered a market failure, or inefficiency.

Subsidies targeted at goods in one country, by lowering the price of those goods, make them more competitive against foreign goods, thereby reducing foreign competition. As a result, many developing countries cannot engage in foreign trade, and receive lower prices for their products in the global market. This is considered protectionism: a government policy to erect trade barriers in order to protect domestic industries. The problem with protectionism arises when industries are selected for nationalistic reasons (infant-industry), rather than to gain a comparative advantage. The market distortion, and reduction in social welfare, is the logic behind the World Bank policy for the removal of subsidies in developing countries.

Subsidies create spillover effects in other economic sectors and industries. A subsidized product sold in the world market lowers the price of the good in other countries. Since subsidies result in lower revenues for producers of foreign countries, they are a source of tension between the United States, Europe and poorer developing countries. While subsidies may provide immediate benefits to an industry, in the long-run they may prove to have unethical, negative effects. Subsidies are intended to support public interest, however, they can violate ethical or legal principles if they lead to higher consumer prices or discriminate against some producers to benefit others. For example, domestic subsidies granted by individual US states may be unconstitutional if they discriminate against out-of-state producers, violating the Privileges and Immunities Clause or the Dormant Commerce Clause of the United States Constitution. Depending on their nature, subsidies are discouraged by international trade agreements such as the World Trade Organization (WTO). This trend, however, may change in the future, as needs of sustainable development and environmental protection could suggest different interpretations regarding energy and renewable energy subsidies. In its July 2019 report, "Going for Growth 2019: The time for reform is now", the OECD suggests that countries make better use of environmental taxation, phase out agricultural subsidies and environmentally harmful tax breaks.

Cross subsidization results in effect in a redistribution between population groups.

== Preventing fraud ==
In the Netherlands, audits are performed to verify whether the funds that have been received has indeed been spent legally (and all requirements of the subsidy provider have been attained), for the purpose intended. It hence prevents fraud.

== Perverse subsidies ==
=== Definitions ===
Although subsidies can be important, many create perverse incentives and adverse unintended consequences. To be "perverse", subsidies must exert effects that are demonstrably and significantly adverse both economically and environmentally. A subsidy rarely, if ever, starts perverse, but over time a legitimate efficacious subsidy can become perverse or illegitimate if it is not withdrawn after meeting its goal or as political goals change. Perverse subsidies are now so widespread that as of 2007 they amounted $2 trillion per year in the six most subsidised sectors alone (agriculture, fossil fuels, road transportation, water, fisheries and forestry).

=== Effects ===
The detrimental effects of perverse subsidies are diverse in nature and reach. Case-studies from differing sectors are highlighted below but can be summarised as follows.

Directly, they are expensive to governments by directing resources away from other legitimate should priorities (such as environmental conservation, education, health, or infrastructure), ultimately reducing the fiscal health of the government.

Indirectly, they cause environmental degradation (exploitation of resources, pollution, loss of landscape, misuse and overuse of supplies) which, as well as its fundamental damage, acts as a further brake on economies; tend to benefit the few at the expense of the many, and the rich at the expense of the poor; lead to further polarization of development between the Northern and Southern hemispheres; lower global market prices; and undermine investment decisions reducing the pressure on businesses to become more efficient. Over time the latter effect means support becomes enshrined in human behaviour and business decisions to the point where people become reliant on, even addicted to, subsidies, "locking" them into society.

Consumer attitudes do not change and become out-of-date, off-target and inefficient; furthermore, over time people feel a sense of historical right to them.

=== Implementation ===
Perverse subsidies are not tackled as robustly as they should be. Principally, this is because they become "locked" into society, causing bureaucratic roadblocks and institutional inertia. When cuts are suggested many argue (most fervently by those "entitled", special interest groups and political lobbyists) that it will disrupt and harm the lives of people who receive them, distort domestic competitiveness curbing trade opportunities, and increase unemployment. Individual governments recognise this as a "prisoner's dilemma" – insofar as that even if they wanted to adopt subsidy reform, by acting unilaterally they fear only negative effects will ensue if others do not follow. Furthermore, cutting subsidies, however perverse they may be, is considered a vote-losing policy.

Reform of perverse subsidies is at a propitious time. The current economic conditions mean governments are forced into fiscal constraints and are looking for ways to reduce activist roles in their economies. There are two main reform paths: unilateral and multilateral. Unilateral agreements (one country) are less likely to be undertaken for the reasons outlined above, although New Zealand, Russia, Bangladesh and others represent successful examples. Multilateral actions by several countries are more likely to succeed as this reduces competitiveness concerns, but are more complex to implement requiring greater international collaboration through a body such as the WTO. Irrespective of the path, the aim of policymakers should be to: create alternative policies that target the same issue as the original subsidies but better; develop subsidy removal strategies allowing market-discipline to return; introduce "sunset" provisions that require remaining subsidies to be re-justified periodically; and make perverse subsidies more transparent to taxpayers to alleviate the "vote-loser" concern.

=== Examples ===
==== Agricultural subsidies ====
Support for agriculture dates back to the 19th century. It was developed extensively in the EU and US across the two World Wars and the Great Depression to protect domestic food production, but remains important across the world today. In 2005, US farmers received $14 billion and EU farmers $47 billion in agricultural subsidies. Today, agricultural subsidies are defended on the grounds of helping farmers to maintain their livelihoods. The majority of payments are based on outputs and inputs and thus favour the larger producing agribusinesses over the small-scale farmers. In the US nearly 30% of payments go to the top 2% of farmers.

By subsidising inputs and outputs through such schemes as "yield based subsidisation", farmers are encouraged to over-produce using intensive methods, including using more fertilizers and pesticides; grow high-yielding monocultures; reduce crop rotation; shorten fallow periods; and promote exploitative land use change from forests, rainforests and wetlands to agricultural land. These all lead to severe environmental degradation, including adverse effects on soil quality and productivity including erosion, nutrient supply and salinity which in turn affects carbon storage and cycling, water retention and drought resistance; water quality including pollution, nutrient deposition and eutrophication of waterways, and lowering of water tables; diversity of flora and fauna including indigenous species both directly and indirectly through the destruction of habitats, resulting in a genetic wipe-out.

Cotton growers in the US reportedly receive half their income from the government under the Farm Bill of 2002. The subsidy payments stimulated overproduction and resulted in a record cotton harvest in 2002, much of which had to be sold at very reduced prices in the global market. For foreign producers, the depressed cotton price lowered their prices far below the break-even price. In fact, African farmers received 35 to 40 cents per pound for cotton, while US cotton growers, backed by government agricultural payments, received 75 cents per pound. Developing countries and trade organizations argue that poorer countries should be able to export their principal commodities to survive, but protectionist laws and payments in the United States and Europe prevent these countries from engaging in international trade opportunities.

==== Fisheries ====
Today, much of the world's major fisheries are overexploited; in 2002, the WWF estimate this at approximately 75%. Fishing subsidies include "direct assistant to fishers; loan support programs; tax preferences and insurance support; capital and infrastructure programs; marketing and price support programs; and fisheries management, research, and conservation programs." They promote the expansion of fishing fleets, the supply of larger and longer nets, larger yields and indiscriminate catch, as well as mitigating risks which encourages further investment into large-scale operations to the disfavour of the already struggling small-scale industry. Collectively, these result in the continued overcapitalization and overfishing of marine fisheries.

There are four categories of fisheries subsidies. First are direct financial transfers, second are indirect financial transfers and services. Third, certain forms of intervention and fourth, not intervening. The first category regards direct payments from the government received by the fisheries industry. These typically affect profits of the industry in the short term and can be negative or positive. Category two pertains to government intervention, not involving those under the first category. These subsidies also affect the profits in the short term but typically are not negative. Category three includes intervention that results in a negative short-term economic impact, but economic benefits in the long term. These benefits are usually more general societal benefits such as the environment. The final category pertains to inaction by the government, allowing producers to impose certain production costs on others. These subsidies tend to lead to positive benefits in the short term but negative in the long term.

==== Manufacturing subsidies ====
A survey of manufacturing in Britain found government subsidies had had various unintended dysfunctional consequences. The subsidies had usually been selective or discriminatory – benefiting some companies at the expense of others. Government money in the form of grants and awards of production and R&D contracts had gone to advanced and viable firms as well as old uneconomic enterprises. However, the main recipients had been larger, established companies – while most of the firms pioneering radical technical-product developments with long-term economic growth potential had been new small enterprises. The study concluded that instead of providing subsidies, governments wanting to benefit industrial-technological development and performance should lower standard rates of business taxation, raise tax allowances for investments in new plant, equipment and products, and remove obstacles to market competition and customer choice.

==== Others ====
The US National Football League's (NFL) profits have topped records at $11 billion, the highest of all sports. The NFL had tax-exempt status until voluntarily relinquishing it in 2015, and new stadiums have been built with public subsidies.

The Commitment to Development Index (CDI), published by the Center for Global Development, measures the effect that subsidies and trade barriers actually have on the undeveloped world. It uses trade, along with six other components such as aid or investment, to rank and evaluate developed countries on policies that affect the undeveloped world. It finds that the richest countries spend $106 billion per year subsidizing their own farmers – almost exactly as much as they spend on foreign aid.

== Short list of subsidies ==
- Agricultural subsidy
- Fisheries subsidy
- Export subsidy
- Energy subsidy
- Fossil fuel subsidies (oil subsidies, coal subsidies, gas subsidies)
- Photovoltaics subsidy
- Party subsidies
- Wage subsidy
- Artist subsidy (Netherlands)

== See also ==
- Cultural subsidy
- Subsidization of company cars
- Federal government
- Audit software in governmental procurement
- Municipal services
- Rail subsidies
- Stadium subsidy
- Tax exemption
