= Fishing fleet =

Aggregate of commercial fishing vessels

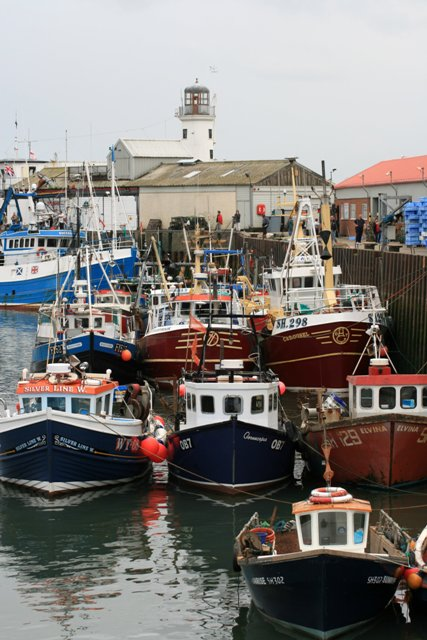
Part of the local fishing fleet moored in the harbour of Scarborough, England

A fishing fleet is an aggregate of commercial fishing vessels. The term may be used of all vessels operating out of a particular port, all vessels engaged in a particular type of fishing (as in the "tuna fishing fleet"), or all fishing vessels of a country or region.

Although fishing vessels are not formally organized as if they were a naval fleet, very often the constraints of time and weather are such that they must all leave or return together, thus creating at least the appearance of an organized body (some countries, such as the former Soviet Union, did however organise their fishing fleets partially along naval lines and used the ships to also gather naval intelligence).

Fishermen operating a particular type of vessel or in a particular port often belong to a local association which disseminates information and may be used to coordinate activities, such as how best to prevent overfishing in particular areas.

== World fishing fleet ==
In 2002 the world fishing fleet numbered about four million vessels. About one-third were decked. The remaining undecked boats were generally less than 10 metres long, and 65 percent were not fitted with mechanical propulsion systems. The FAO estimates that Asia accounts for over 80 percent of them.

The average size of decked vessels is about 20 gross tons (10–15 metres). Only one percent of the world fishing fleet is larger than 100 gross tons (longer than 24 metres). China has half (25,600) of these larger vessels.

There is no international instrument in force concerning the safety of fishing vessels. International conventions and agreements awaiting ratification which concern safety at sea are almost exclusively aimed at vessels 24 metres in length and over, and therefore do not apply to artisan vessels in developing countries. Safety regulations for all fishing vessels are left almost entirely to national discretion.

== Other uses ==
The fishing fleet was an ironic reference to the shipping of unmarried young women from the UK to India during the middle and latter years of the Raj, for the purposes of becoming married to colonial administrators, officers and plantation supervisors.
