= Fisheries subsidy =

A fisheries subsidy is a government action that confers an advantage on consumers or extractors of fish in order to supplement their income or lower their cost. Fisheries subsidy are addressed in sustainable development goal 14 where target 14.6 works on prohibiting subsidies contributing to overcapacity and over fishing, unreported and unregulated fishing and refrain from new such subsidies.

== Extent ==
The estimates on the global amounts of fisheries subsidies vary and range from US$15–35 billion annually. The range of estimates is partially due to fact that fisheries subsidies come in many shapes and forms. Fisheries subsidies include direct transfers of funds, income or price support measures, tax credits, exemptions and rebates, low-interest loans and guarantees, preferential treatment and use of regulatory support mechanisms. Not all estimates include government funding for fisheries management, such data collection and control and enforcement, or the possible absence of access fees.

An open letter by almost 300 scientists found that as of 2021 harmful fisheries subsidies have increased globally and asks the WTO to eliminate such subsidies. It did so in 2022, ordering countries to end subsidies for illegal, unreported and unregulated fishing; fishing in international waters; or fishing of overfished stocks.

== Impacts ==
It is acknowledged that some forms of fisheries subsidies can threaten the sustainability of fisheries resources by encouraging overfishing/overcapacity and excess fishing effort. Therefore, reducing the long-term viability of the fishing industries which are estimated to generate US$ 50 billion less per year than they could as a result of subsidies, while others are considered beneficial, promoting conservations and sustainable fisheries management. States committed at the 2002 World Summit on Sustainable Development (WSSD) to eliminate subsidies that contribute to illegal, unregulated, and unreported (IUU) fishing and overcapacity. Also, parties to the World Trade Organization agreed to strengthen disciplines on fisheries subsidies, including through a prohibition of certain forms of fisheries subsidies that contribute to overcapacity and overfishing.

== Society and culture ==
=== Global goals ===
The United Nations' framework for Sustainable Development Goals includes targets to end subsidies that contribute to overfishing within Goal 14, Life Below Water.

== See also ==
- Fishing subsidies in the United States
- Overfishing
- Common Fisheries Policy
