= DSCC =

DSCC can mean:

- Deep Space Communications Complex (disambiguation), various places
- Deep Sea Conservation Coalition, an international alliance of conservation organizations
- Democratic Senatorial Campaign Committee, US Senate Democratic campaign arm
- Defense Supply Center, Columbus, a military institution in Ohio
- Dyersburg State Community College, in Tennessee
- Designation and Sentence Computation Center, part of the United States' Federal Bureau of Prisons
- Dhaka South City Corporation, a local governing body in Bangladesh
