= Blue Parks =

Marine conservation initiative

Blue Parks (formerly the Global Ocean Refuge System, or GLORES) is a conservation initiative launched by the nonprofit Marine Conservation Institute in 2017. The program recognizes marine protected areas (MPAs) that meet criteria intended to promote long-term biodiversity conservation. The initiative is overseen by the Marine Conservation Institute with guidance from the Blue Parks Science Council, an international body of marine scientists.

== History ==
The idea for an international recognition program for MPAs was introduced in 2013 by Elliott Norse, founder of the Marine Conservation Institute. Norse and his colleagues consulted with marine scientists and practitioners through a series of workshops to develop the Global Ocean Refuge Criteria.

The first version of the criteria was published in 2017, and the first awards were announced that year at the 4th International Marine Protected Area Congress in Chile. In 2019 the initiative was renamed Blue Parks, and the criteria became the Blue Park Standard.

Since its launch, Blue Park Awards have been presented at international gatherings including the Our Ocean Conference (2018, 2019, 2024), the United Nations Ocean Conference (2022, 2025), and the 6th International Marine Protected Area Congress (2023).

In 2020 the Marine Conservation Institute introduced "Blue Spark" collaborations to support developing MPAs that are working toward meeting the Blue Park Standard.

The Blue Parks initiative has been endorsed by the United Nations Decade of Ocean Science for Sustainable Development (2021–2030) and included in the International Union for Conservation of Nature's Panorama Solutions for a Healthy Planet.

== Blue Park Standard ==
The Blue Park Standard establishes criteria for MPA location and design, governance, protection level, management, compliance, and capacity. It was included in a review of frameworks for evaluating marine protected area management effectiveness in Marine Policy. To earn Blue Park Awards, MPAs are evaluated against the Standard by the Blue Parks Science Council. Awards are given to MPAs that meet the required criteria.

As of 2025, 34 MPAs in 23 countries have received Blue Park Awards.

== See also ==
- Marine conservation
- Marine reserve
- Marine park
- List of marine protected areas
