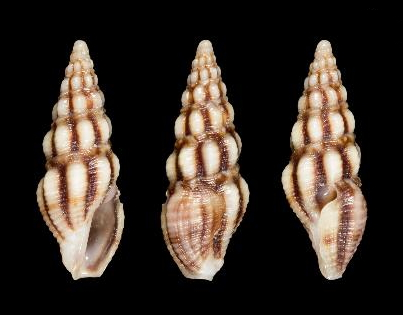
- Shell of Crassispira bruehli (holotype in MNHN, Paris)

Scientific classification
- Kingdom: Animalia
- Phylum: Mollusca
- Class: Gastropoda
- Subclass: Caenogastropoda
- Order: Neogastropoda
- Superfamily: Conoidea
- Family: Pseudomelatomidae
- Genus: Crassispira
- Species: C. bruehli

Binomial name
- Crassispira bruehli Stahlschmidt & Fraussen, 2014

Synonyms
- Drillia bottae (Valenciennes in Kiener, 1839); Pleurotoma bottae Valenciennes in Kiener, 1839 (original combination)

= Crassispira bruehli =

Species of gastropod

Crassispira bruehli is a species of sea snail, a marine gastropod mollusk in the family Pseudomelatomidae.

== Description ==
The length of the shell attains 11 mm. It has narrow, high-spired shell, and is usually light in appearance.

== Distribution ==
This marine species occurs off Palawan Island, Coron, Philippines.

== Sources ==
- Stahlschmidt P. & Fraussen K. (2014) Two new turrid species (Gastropoda: Pseudomelatomidae) from the Palawan region, the Philippines. Zootaxa 3784(1): 89–93. [26 March 2014]
