= Coron, Palawan =

Municipality in Palawan, Philippines

Coron
- Municipality
- Municipality of Coron
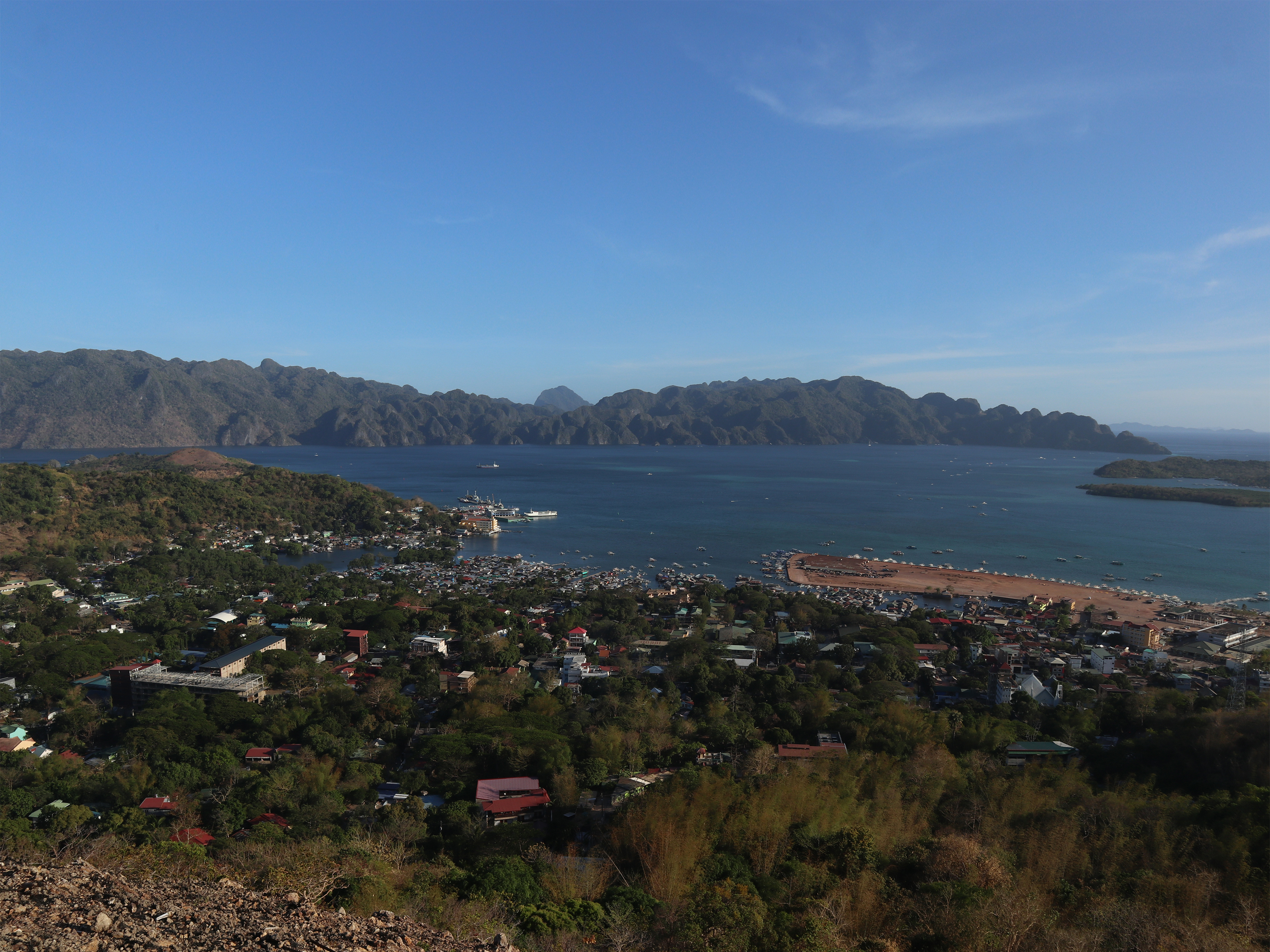
- Coron skyline

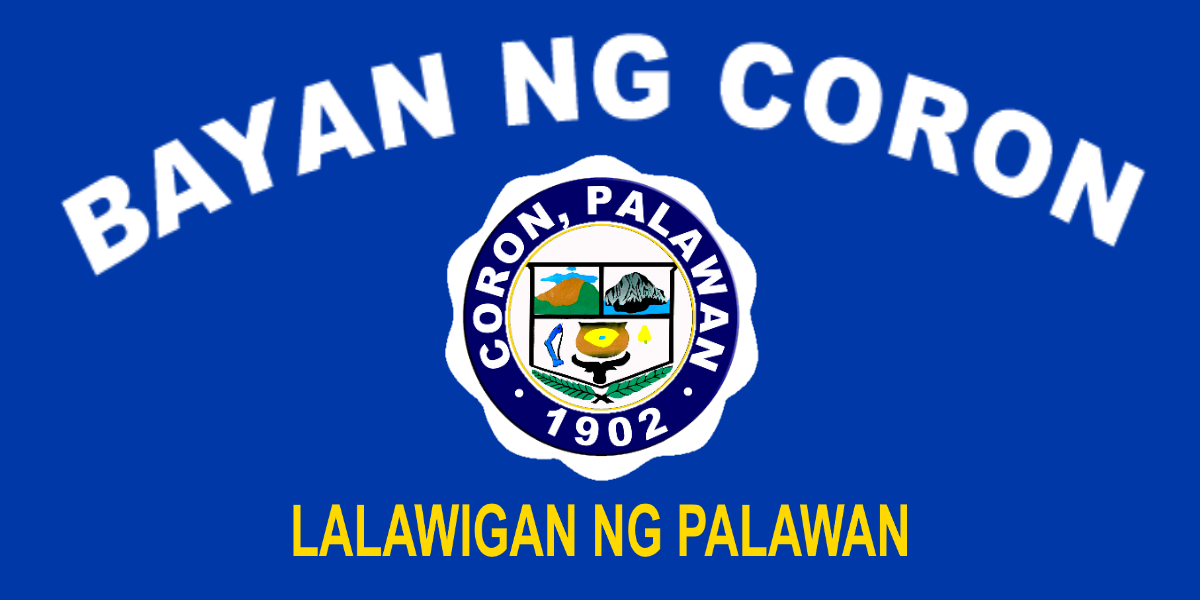
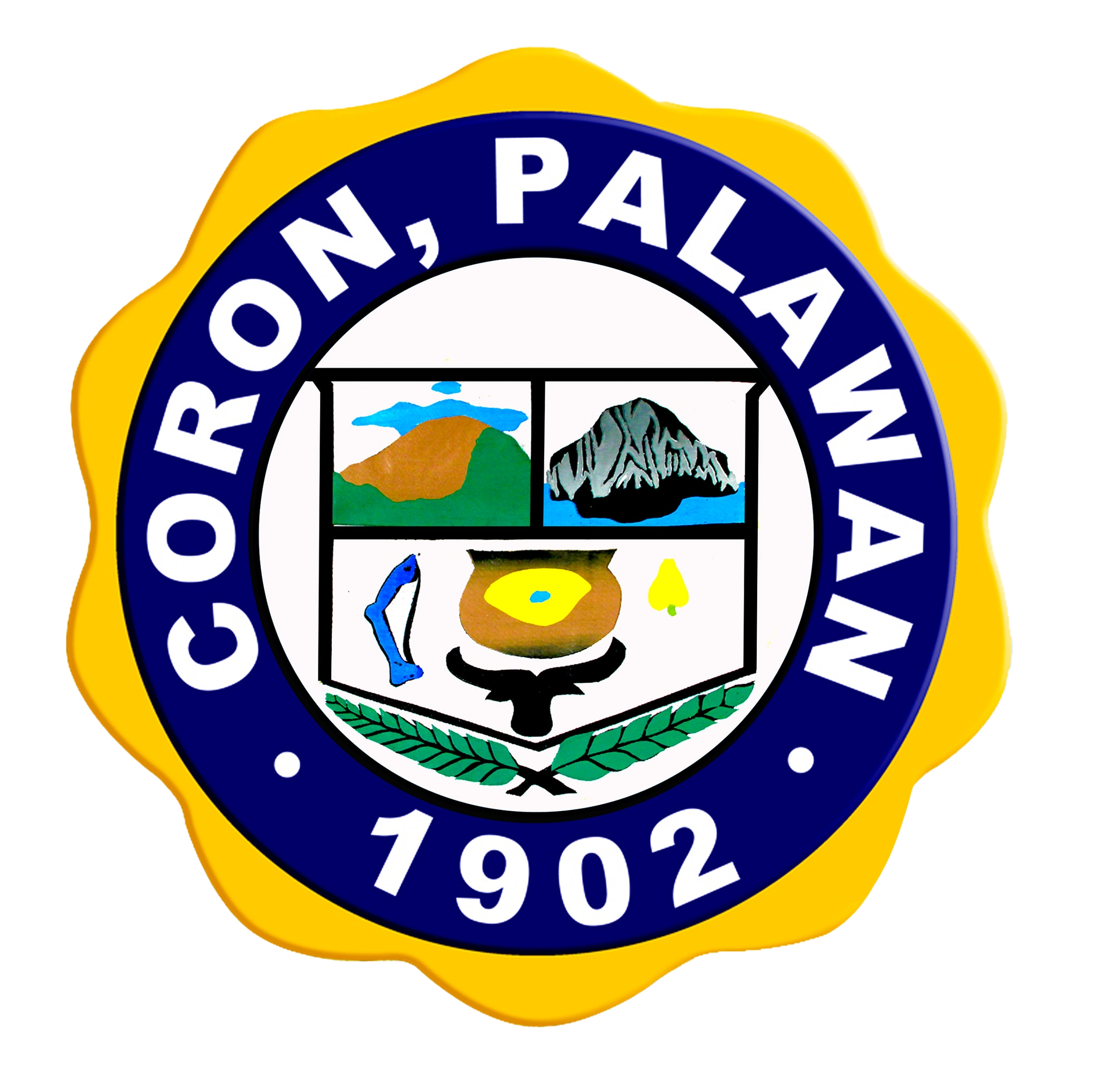
- Flag Seal

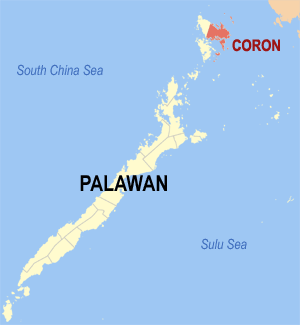
- Map of Palawan with Coron highlighted
- Interactive map of Coron
- Location within the Philippines
- Coordinates: 11°59′56″N 120°12′19″E
- Country: Philippines
- Region: Mimaropa
- Province: Palawan
- District: 1st district
- Founded: June 2, 1902
- Barangays: 23 (see Barangays)

Government
  - Type: Sangguniang Bayan
  - Mayor: Mario Tolentino Reyes Jr.
  - Vice Mayor: Asian Manasseh Lorenzo A. Palanca
  - Representative: Rosalie Salvame
  - Municipal Council: Members: Jerald R. Rodriguez; Efren D. Tejada; John Patrick S. Matta; Michael G. Sadhwani; Richard G. Badang; Philip Andrew A. Astor; Nashville M. Yong; Christian A. Palanca
  - Electorate: 41,434 voters (2025)

Area
  - Total: 689.10 km^{2} (266.06 sq mi)
- Elevation: 8.0 m (26.2 ft)
- Highest elevation: 957 m (3,140 ft)
- Lowest elevation: 0 m (0 ft)

Population (2024 census)
  - Total: 69,439
  - Density: 100.77/km^{2} (260.99/sq mi)
  - Households: 16,483

Economy
  - Income class: 1st municipal income class
  - Poverty incidence: 18.7% (2023)
  - Revenue: ₱ 496.6 million (2024)
  - Assets: ₱ 1,485 million (2024)
  - Expenditure: ₱ 880.2 million (2024)
  - Liabilities: ₱ 562.4 million (2024)

Service provider
  - Electricity: Busuanga Island Electric Cooperative (BISELCO)
- Time zone: UTC+8 (PST)
- ZIP code: 5316
- PSGC: 1705309000
- IDD : area code: +63 (0)48
- Native languages: Calamian Tagbanwa; Kagayanen; Palawano; Tagalog
- Website: https://coron-palawan.com/

Coron, officially the Municipality of Coron (Tagalog: Bayan ng Coron), is a municipality in the province of Palawan, Philippines. According to the 2024 census, it has a population of 69,439 people.

It is home to the Coron Island Natural Biotic Area, which is listed in the natural category of the UNESCO World Heritage Tentative List.

== Etymology ==
Before the present name, it was called Bancuang, named after the native name of the palm that grew abundantly along the rivers and marshes especially at the spot where the spring that was source of the town's water supply was found. When the Spaniards arrived, they named the area Peñon de Coron, after the Tagbanua word "Corong", a type of pot. In 1902, the name was changed into Coron, its present name which is used to this date.

== History ==
=== Precolonial and Spanish era ===
The Calamian Islands were originally inhabited mainly by the Cuyunon tribe and nominally by the Tagbanuas and the Calamianen. Cuyunon oral history tells that the Datu Macanas ruled the entire Busuanga Island where present-day Coron town lies. Early on Spanish exploration of the islands, Fray de la Concepcion took note of the friendliness of the people of Busuanga Island and the ferocity of the Tagbanua tribe living in Coron Island.

Early on the history of the Calamianes, Coron was directly ruled by the Spanish in Mindoro while the island of Cuyo by the Spanish authorities in Panay. In this area of the Calamianes, the first permanent Spanish settlement was Culion, with Coron as its visita. A fort and church were built in Libis (San Pedro), Culion around 1670 by the Spaniards as part of the defenses against the Muslim raids. It received almost 100 Mexican soldier-colonists in the 1670s.

Between 1730-1735, Spanish missionaries built another cotta at Culion to defend from Moro incursions. The Spaniards eventually left for Panay with the exception of priests who stayed at Camianan.

Coron (Banuang Daan) became a settlement for migrants to the Calamianes. Don Nicolas Manlavi, a Cuyonon served several years in Spanish Galleons, and an Ilonggo from Jaro, Ilo-ilo named Claudio Sandoval later wed Nicolas' only daughter Evarista. The Sandoval clan of the Calamianes came from this union.

The first settlement in Coron was established in 1749 by Don Nicolas Manlavi at Banuang Lague (the old town), now part of present-day Banuang Daan on Coron Island. Due to frequent Moro raids, many residents temporarily relocated to Tagum and Makinit. By 1800, a new town site had been established, prompting the gradual return and resettlement of the population. To protect the community from further attacks, defensive structures such as the Coron Fortress and the Ili Fort in San Miguel, Linacapan, were constructed.

In 1818, there were 2 settler Spanish families in Calamanianes. 1 Spanish family were Spaniards from Spain and the other Spanish family were Spaniards born in the Philippines. Later on, another Spanish siblings of Mexican origin from Jaro, Iloilo arrived, Doña Margarita Custodio and his brother Don Martin Custodio. From the former hailed the Custodio-Abe, Rios, and Hachero Families and from Don Martin the present day Echague Families. Enumerable gobernadorcillos and cabezas de barangay all through the American regime hailed from these roots. During the American occupation (1898–1948), the old Provincia de Calamianes was dissolved and jointly administered with the Island of Paragua as the new province of Palawan.

=== Revolutionary era ===
After the outbreak of the Philippine Revolution led by the Katipunan, the Spaniards became paranoid and convicted 200 men in both Balabac and Calamianes of being anti-Spanish propagandists and placed them in exile. At least half of them were from Busuanga. The anti-Spanish propagandists garrisoned in Culion were led by Rufo Sandoval.

In January 1899, in the aftermath of the revolution, an expedition by revolutionary general Esteban Causapin, Capitan Kilatan and Commandant Pascual Silva with about 20 soldiers arrived at Coron. They told the people that their purpose was to liberate them from the Spaniards of the Hacienda Malbate owned by Bernardo Ascano. The people were easily won over and many recruits were acquired. As a result, Bernardo Ascano and his family were imprisoned by the revolutionaries. Commandant Silva remained at Malbate and confiscated the property of a rich Chinese man named Laurente Tan.

Over time, the principales of Cuyo heard of the unlawful activities of Silva and sought the aid of the Capitan General of Iloilo. The Capitan General then sent Commandant Simeon Rodriguez and his son Captain Gregorio Rodriguez to Cuyo. The tercio civiles under Lieutenant Federico Quizon were turned over to these authorities. Gregorio remained in Cuyo while Simeon and Quizon arrived in Culion in February of the same year. Quizon made an attempt to collaborate with Silva but was caught and executed by Simeon's forces. Silva then left Malbate and proceeded to Bintuan to get more rice. He went to Juan Palanca, a rich Chinese man from the area. Palanca delayed giving help to Silva and secretly informed the authorities of Silva's presence in the area. Silva was eventually arrested, taken to Culion and executed. From this point forward, the people of Coron were able to live peacefully.

=== American era ===
In 1899, American forces arrived in the area and established a military government.

Late in the 1890s, an American naturalist, Dean Worcester, journeyed through the Calamianes collecting specimens and stayed briefly in Culion. At the turn of the century, he was appointed part of the First Philippine Commission, becoming the Secretary of the Interior. He recommended Culion as the Philippine Leper Colony. This act forced the transfer of the Sandoval clan in 1900 to the various barrios of what is now Coron and Busuanga. The Coron town was settled by the family of Claudio Sandoval, and the other Sandovals settled in what is now Bintuan, Salvacion, Concepcion, and Old Busuanga.

On June 2, 1902, a civil government was established with Don Vicente Sandoval as the first Municipal President of Coron thereby converting Coron into a municipality. Since 1905, lepers were segregated in Culion.

In 1907, a beautiful church was built at San Miguel by Capitan Gabino Perez, which remains in total ruin after World War II. However, its old foundation remains visible.

In 1937, during the tenure of Mayor Francisco Reyes, mining companies began operating in the municipality in search of manganese, especially at Malbate. The Compania Minera de Filipina were the first of these exploitative companies. On October 17, 1937, Mayor Francisco Reyes and 6 other councilors resigned due to resentment. He was succeeded by Pedro S. Echague.

=== World War II ===
==== Japanese occupation ====
At 0800 on May 4, 1942, the Imperial Japanese Army arrived in Coron without facing any resistance as its Acting Mayor Quitin Garraez surrendered immediately. Francisco Reyes was made mayor again and he became responsible for saving many lives during his tenure as a puppet mayor. In July of the same year, the Japanese occupied the mining camps. During the Japanese occupation, Filipinos were subjected to the brutality of the Kempeitai through tortures, plunder, rape and all other kinds of atrocities.

==== Filipino resistance ====
During this point, guerrilla activities intensified. On September 2, Captain Bajar with 18 Americans captured and killed 2 Japanese soldiers at Patungan. The Japanese retaliated on the 5th by massacring the people of Patungan. On the 7th, guerrilla forces launched a counterattack under Captain Carlos Amores at Singay Camp. They attacked on the 8th and the 9th where they attacked Japanese launches and massacred their forces. Another encounter occurred on the 29th between the Japanese and Filipino forces under Lt. Jesus Rañada and Lt. Simeon Macolor. By December 1942, guerrilla supplies at Coron were exhausted.

On February 26, 1943, guerrilla forces landed at Sitio Colatang and organized their headquarters at Otoy and Cobata.

On September 24, 1944, at around 0900, more than 100 American planes arrived in the skies of Coron and bombed up to 24-80 Japanese ships of different categories. Most of them were sunk at Busuanga.

==== Liberation ====
In February 1945, guerrilla forces from Palawan arrived in Culion and established their headquarters. American aircraft subsequently delivered food supplies to lepers and civilian refugees. At the same time, American PT boats bombarded the town of Coron under the command of Lt. Trinidad Vizconde, amid reports that Japanese forces remained in the area awaiting the arrival of American liberation troops. The bombardment resulted in the destruction of many houses. By March 1945, Coron had been liberated from Japanese control. American forces later utilized an airfield at Malaking Patag. In recognition of his wartime service, Captain Carlos Amores was later elected mayor of Coron, but was however replaced by Lt. Simeon Macolor after the Supreme Court, through a general resolution, discounted the inmate votes from Culion.

=== Post-war independence ===
In 1950, the town of Busuanga was created from the barrios of Concepcion, Salvacion, Busuanga, New Busuanga, Buluang, Quezon, Calawit, and Cheey which used to belong to Coron. In 1954, the islands of Linapacan, Cabunlaoan, Niangalao, Decabayotot, Calibanbangan, Pical, and Barangonan were separated from Coron to form the town of Linapacan.

On June 5, 1998, Coron Island was recognized as an ancestral domain with the issuance of CADC No. 134 to the Tagbanua people.

On September 9, 2026, the passenger-cargo ship MV June Aster caught fire offshore Coron, resulting in 76 confirmed fatalities. An investigation has been opened.

== Geography ==
The municipality of Busuanga comprises the western part of Busuanga Island, while Coron comprises the eastern part of Busuanga Island, all of Coron Island and about 50 other minor islets stretching as far as Tara Island in the north-east and Canipo Island in the south. All these islands are part of the Calamian Archipelago in northern Palawan that separates the South China Sea from the Sulu Sea.

=== Barangays ===
Coron is politically subdivided into 23 barangays. Each barangay consists of puroks and some have sitios.

- Banuang Daan
- Bintuan
- Borac
- Buenavista
- Bulalacao
- Cabugao
- Decabobo
- Decalachao
- Guadalupe (also called Binalabag)
- Lajala
- Malawig
- Marcilla
- Barangay I (Poblacion)
- Barangay II (Poblacion)
- Barangay III (Poblacion)
- Barangay IV (Poblacion)
- Barangay V (Poblacion)
- Barangay VI (Poblacion)
- San Jose
- San Nicolas
- Tagumpay
- Tara
- Turda

=== Climate ===
Climate data for Coron, Palawan (1991–2020, extremes 1950–2023)
Month	Jan	Feb	Mar	Apr	May	Jun	Jul	Aug	Sep	Oct	Nov	Dec	Year
Record high °C (°F)	36.4 (97.5)	36.1 (97.0)	37.4 (99.3)	37.6 (99.7)	37.6 (99.7)	36.5 (97.7)	35.7 (96.3)	34.7 (94.5)	34.6 (94.3)	36.6 (97.9)	37.0 (98.6)	36.0 (96.8)	37.6 (99.7)
Mean daily maximum °C (°F)	32.5 (90.5)	32.7 (90.9)	33.1 (91.6)	34.1 (93.4)	33.5 (92.3)	32.1 (89.8)	30.9 (87.6)	31.1 (88.0)	31.2 (88.2)	32.1 (89.8)	32.8 (91.0)	32.3 (90.1)	32.4 (90.3)
Daily mean °C (°F)	28.0 (82.4)	28.1 (82.6)	28.7 (83.7)	29.5 (85.1)	29.3 (84.7)	28.3 (82.9)	27.5 (81.5)	27.7 (81.9)	27.6 (81.7)	28.2 (82.8)	28.6 (83.5)	28.2 (82.8)	28.3 (82.9)
Mean daily minimum °C (°F)	23.5 (74.3)	23.6 (74.5)	24.3 (75.7)	24.9 (76.8)	25.0 (77.0)	24.6 (76.3)	24.1 (75.4)	24.3 (75.7)	24.1 (75.4)	24.2 (75.6)	24.4 (75.9)	24.1 (75.4)	24.3 (75.7)
Record low °C (°F)	12.2 (54.0)	13.3 (55.9)	13.4 (56.1)	14.0 (57.2)	18.1 (64.6)	17.6 (63.7)	17.1 (62.8)	17.0 (62.6)	17.4 (63.3)	17.2 (63.0)	16.1 (61.0)	14.7 (58.5)	12.2 (54.0)
Average rainfall mm (inches)	19.2 (0.76)	22.9 (0.90)	15.4 (0.61)	37.0 (1.46)	186.9 (7.36)	318.7 (12.55)	521.5 (20.53)	471.7 (18.57)	470.4 (18.52)	241.2 (9.50)	107.1 (4.22)	90.3 (3.56)	2,502.3 (98.52)
Average rainy days (≥ 1.0 mm)	3	2	3	4	11	17	21	19	20	14	7	6	127
Average relative humidity (%)	78	76	75	76	81	86	88	88	89	86	82	80	82
Source: PAGASA

== Demographics ==
Population census of Coron

Year	Pop.	±% p.a.
1903	5,134	—
1918	12,438	+6.08%
1939	18,682	+1.96%
1948	16,445	−1.41%
1960	14,996	−0.77%
1970	17,852	+1.76%
1975	20,828	+3.14%
1980	25,129	+3.82%

Year	Pop.	±% p.a.
1990	33,228	+2.83%
1995	27,040	−3.79%
2000	32,243	+3.84%
2007	40,007	+3.02%
2010	42,941	+2.61%
2015	51,803	+3.64%
2020	65,855	+5.18%
2024	69,439	+1.28%

Source: Philippine Statistics Authority

In the 2024 census, the population of Coron was 69,439 people, with a density of 100 inhabitants per square kilometre or 260 inhabitants per square mile.

== Economy ==
Poverty incidence of Coron (%)

Source: Philippine Statistics Authority

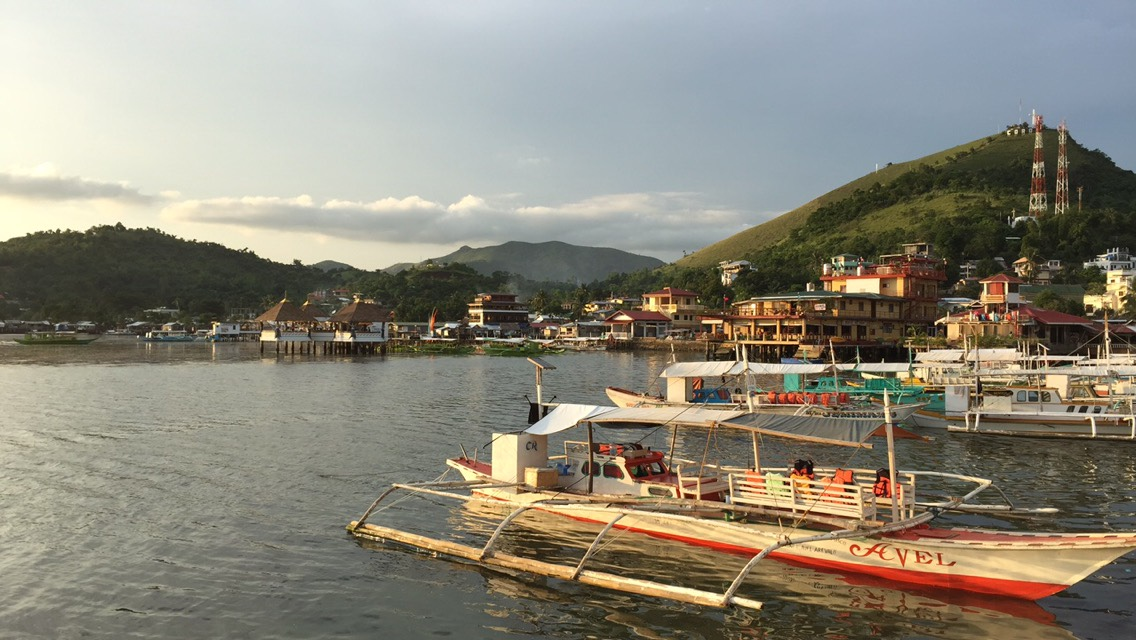
Fishing boats in Coron.

The main industries of Coron are fishing and tourism. Former industries include manganese mining at Singay Mines in Barangay San Nicolas during the Japanese Occupation period. This was followed by the fishing industry boom during the 1970s up to the 1990s which gradually dwindled due to illegal blast and sodium cyanide fishing. The rattan and basket-weaving industry which also gradually declined during the same period due to the ensuing depletion of raw materials.

Currently tourism is the top industry in Coron due to local beaches, dive sites, Lagoons and other natural tourist spots. A dozen sunken Japanese warships at depths between 10 and 40 meters (33 and 131 ft) off Coron Island is a diving destination, listed in Forbes Traveler Magazine’s top 10 best scuba diving sites in the world. A description of the diving highlights in 2021 is provided by Dive the World.

The municipality is the commercial capital of the Calamian Islands.

=== Siete Pecados Marine Park ===
On April 17, 2024, the Siete Pecados Marine Park, under Jose Mazo, manager, in Coron, as one of 3 marine protected areas, won the Blue Park Award by Marine Conservation Institute at the 9th Our Ocean Conference in Athens for its role in conservation of marine biodiversity. It is part of the Calamian Islands Network in the Philippines, within a short distance from the coast of Coron. Founded in 2005 by the United States Agency for International Development, it is currently an ecotourism landmark.

== Government ==
The main population center of the municipality is composed of Poblacion barangays 1 to 6, where the Municipal Building, the Municipal Legislative Building, and the Judicial Hall of the Municipal Circuit Trial Court are located.

== Transportation ==
Coron is served by Francisco B. Reyes Airport, which has direct flights to Manila, Cebu and Angeles.

== Culture ==
Town fiesta is held annually on August 28 in honor of Saint Augustine.

== Education ==
There are two schools district offices which govern all educational institutions within the municipality. They oversee the management and operations of all private and public, from primary to secondary schools. These are the:

- Coron Coastal Schools District
- Coron Inland Schools District

=== Primary and elementary schools ===
- Banuang Daan Elementary School
- Bayang Elementary School
- Bayo Bayo Elementary School
- Benecan Elementary School
- Bintuan Elementary School
- Borac Elementary School
- Buenavista Elementary School
- Buyot Elementary School
- Cabugao Elementary School
- Camanga Elementary School
- Canipo Elementary School
- Capayas Elementary School
- Central Fundamental Baptist Church of Coron Learning Center
- Christ Our Refuge Learning Center
- Claudio Sandoval Elementary School
- Claudio Sandoval South Elementary School
- Decabobo Elementary School
- Decalachao Elementary School
- Diandanao Elementary School
- Dipuyok Elementary School
- Guadalupe Elementary School
- Lajala Elementary School
- Lelebquen Elementary School
- Malawig Elementary School
- Malbato Elementary School
- Marcilla Elementary School
- Maricaban Elementary School
- Napuagan Elementary School
- Saint Augustine Academy
- San Jose Elementary School
- San Nicolas Elementary School
- Sta. Monica Elementary School
- Tagum Elementary School
- Tagumpay Elementary School
- Tara Elementary School
- Tulbuan Elementary School
- Turda Elementary School

=== Secondary schools ===
- Bintuan High School
- Borac National High School
- Buenavista National High School
- Bulalacao Integrated School
- Coron School of Fisheries
- Decalachao National High School
- San Nicolas National High School
- Sta. Monica High School
- Tara High School
- Turda National High School

== Gallery ==
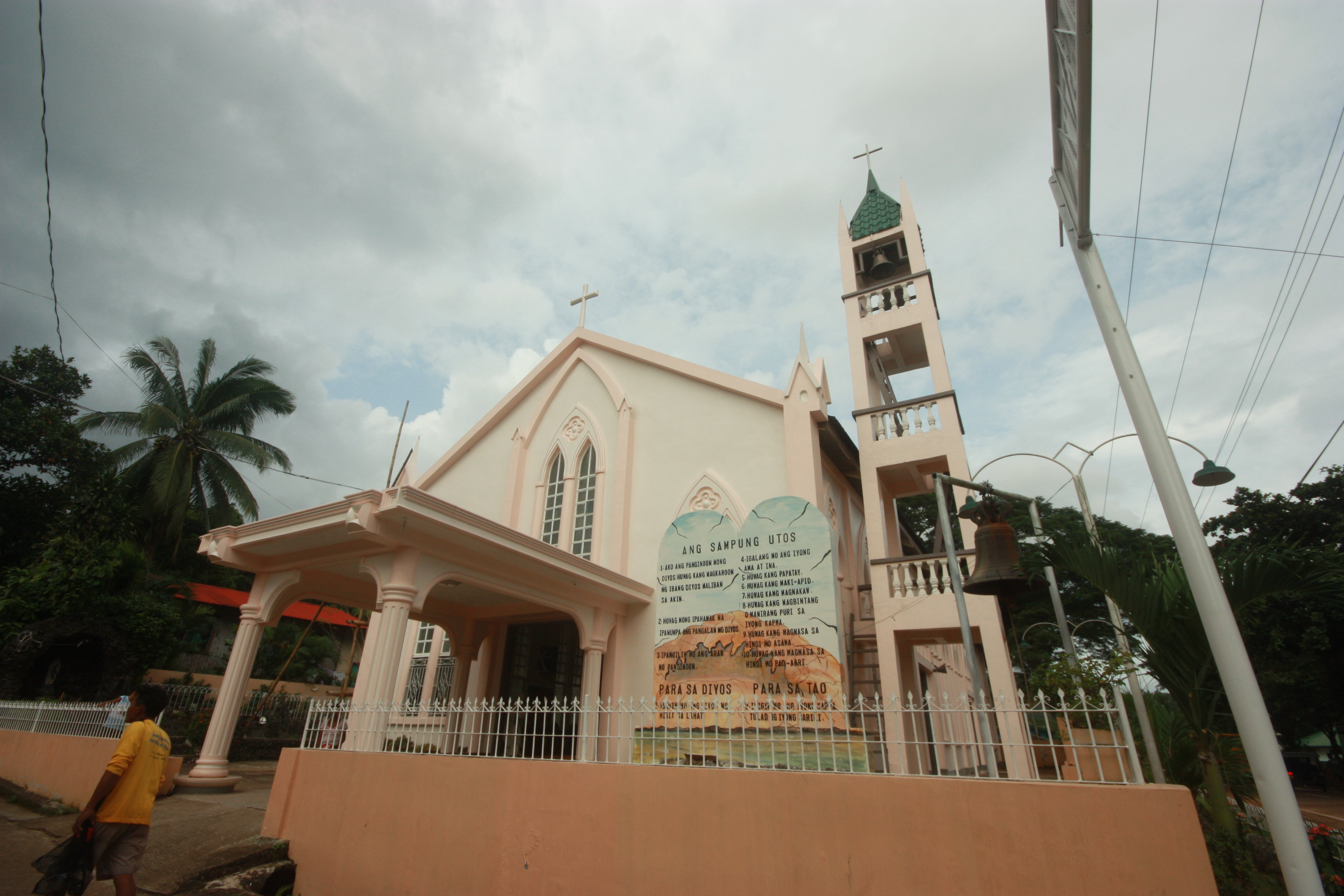
Church in Coron

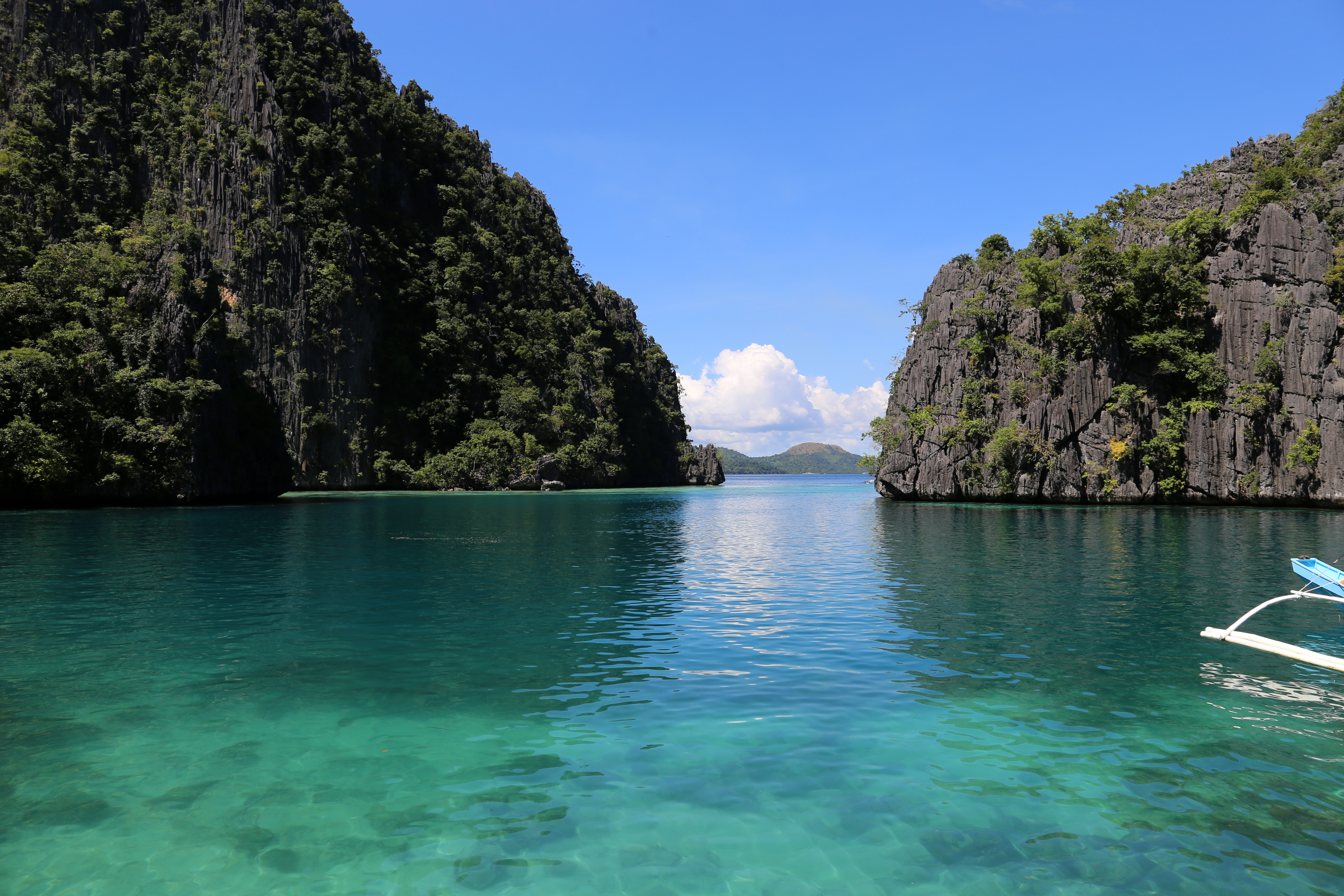
Coron Island

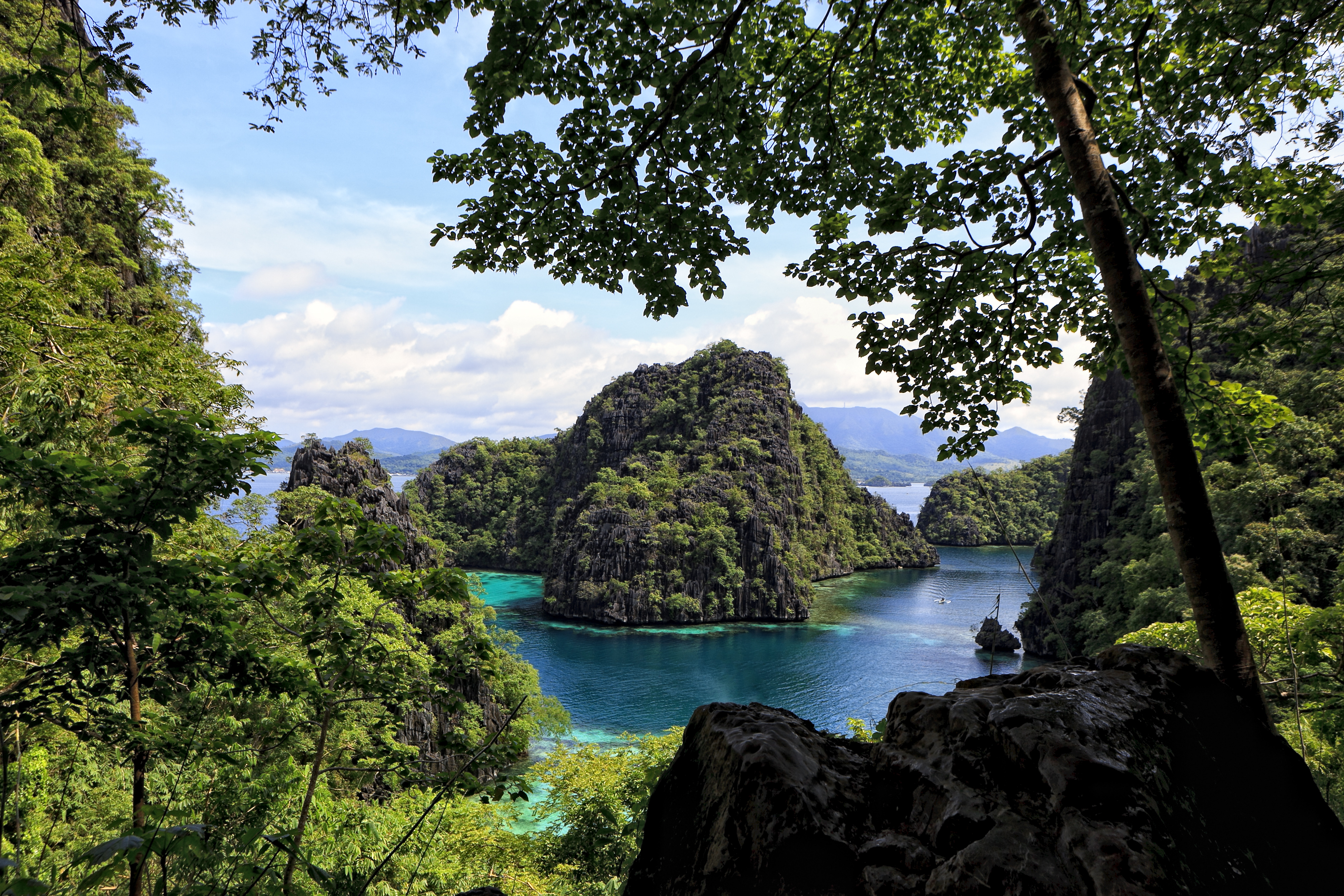
The lagoon going to Kayangan Lake

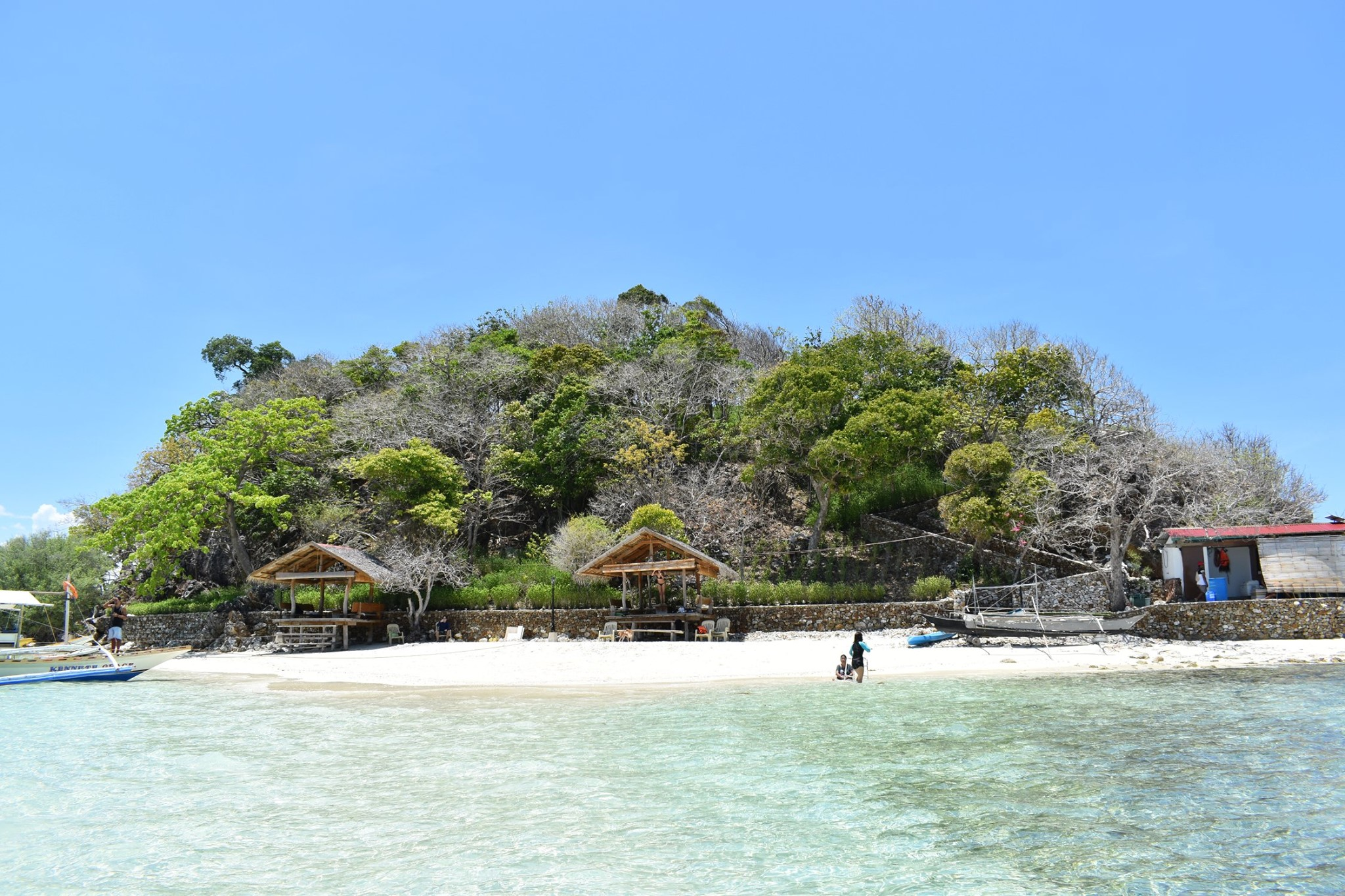
Waling Waling Island, Coron, Palawan

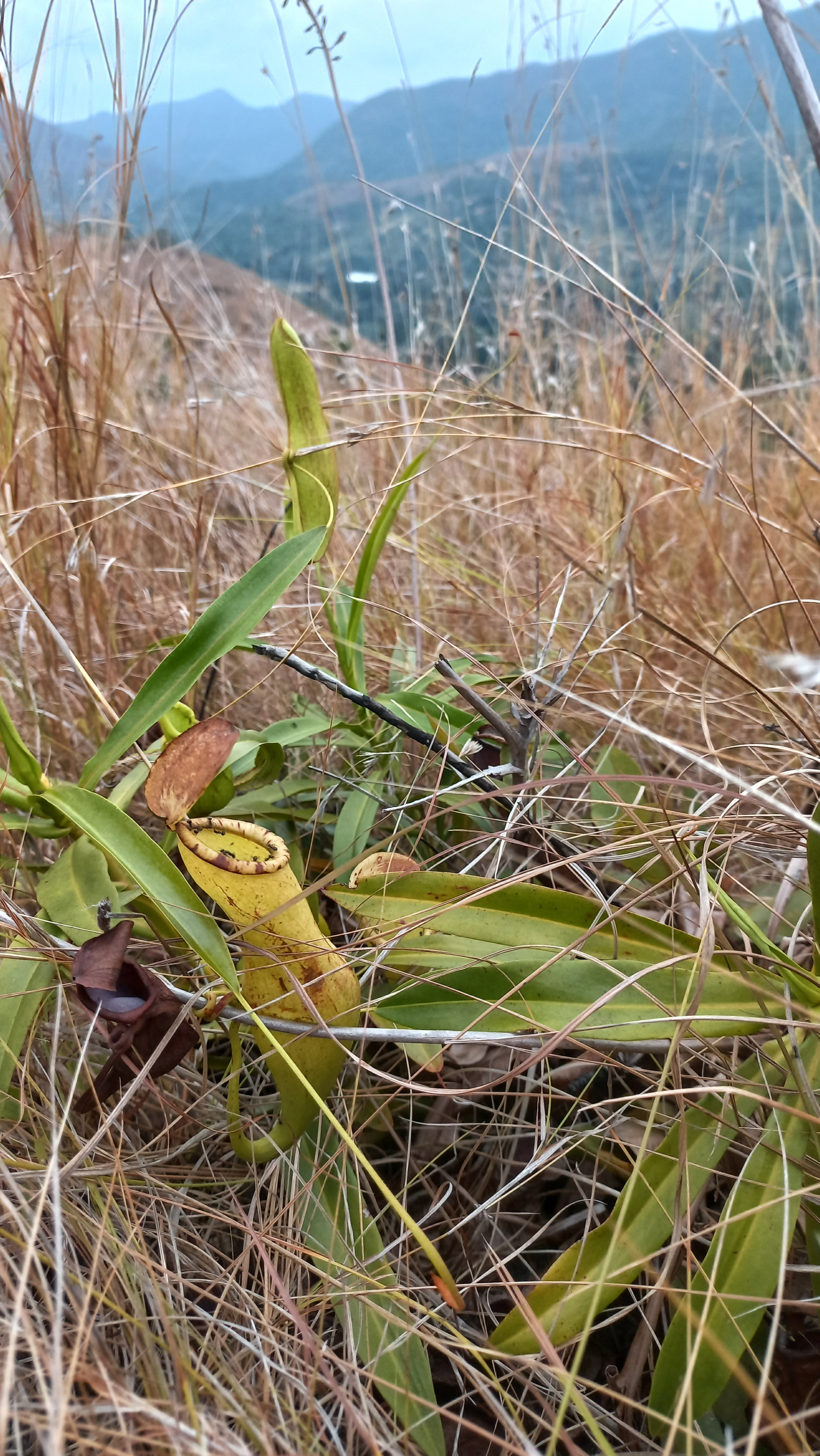
Pitcher plant along the slopes of Mt. Tapyas
