= ProtectedSeas =

American marine conservation organization

ProtectedSeas is a marine conservation organization associated with the Anthropocene Institute. The group is working to develop a visual database, in map form, of every marine protected area (MPA) in the world as well as deploy new radar systems to protect vulnerable areas from illegal activity. The project is headquartered in California.

== Mission ==
ProtectedSeas' mission is to raise awareness and protection of critical marine areas. The organization assists MPA managers in protecting vulnerable ecosystems and works to improve information and transparency around ocean conservation measures. The project's team comprises expertise within the fields of law, geography, and hardware/software design with various backgrounds. ProtectedSeas partners with many NGOs to leverage specific talents and experience.

ProtectedSeas has two sub-projects: the Marine Managed Area Map, and the Marine Monitor (M2) system.

== Marine Managed Area Map ==
ProtectedSeas developed the Marine Managed Area Map as an evolving online tool that boaters can use to track their location on the water with respect to nearby protected areas and other legally restricted zones. The map is free and designed for easy, one-click use by the public as well as those in the marine industry. Its database is also free to download. Information on each area includes which specific activities are allowed and restricted (such as diving or fishing by use of bottom trawl), as well as the protected area's boundaries.

The project began in 2015 and, as of December 2019, ProtectedSeas has mapped 50% of global MPAs and over 2/3 of the ocean by area. Completed regions include the United States, Mexico, the Caribbean, the Baltic and the high seas, with Central and South America coming soon. They have also included many areas across the globe that are species- or gear-restricted but not technically MPAs. For U.S. waters, NOAA and Anthropocene Institute collaborate in a private-public partnership.

ProtectedSeas is one of the first organizations to map marine managed areas in international waters known as the high seas, and release the data at the United Nations Ocean Conference in 2017. Their data is currently included in Navionics charting software. The data was the subject of an academic article, published in 2020, about assessing ocean protection based on marine regulations.

== Marine Monitor System (M2) ==
ProtectedSeas developed a radar surveillance system designed to track vessel movement in sensitive marine areas and successfully demonstrated their first deployment at Moss Landing Marine Labs in 2015. Rangers and other authorities can use this system--called Marine Monitor (M2)--to watch for poachers 24/7, enforce local laws against illegal fishing and potential damage to reefs. The system involves radar, a support structure, power source and internet, making it relatively low cost and a potential solution for hard-to-manage remote areas. There are currently six M2 stations operating in California. They have also been deployed in Micronesia, the Caribbean, Mexico, and Southeast Asia.

Global Conservation is planning an M2 system to monitor the waters off the coast of Isla de la Plata, Ecuador, following the implementation of a two-mile no-fishing zone in Machalilla National Park.

== See also ==
- Marine conservation
- Sustainability
- Marine protected area
