= Green Fins =

Coral reef conservation charity

- Formation: 2004
- Founder: United Nations Environmental Programme | The Reef-World foundation
- Purpose: "To protect and conserve coral reefs by establishing and implementing environmentally friendly guidelines to promote a sustainable diving and snorkelling tourism industry."
- Headquarters: Bristol, United Kingdom
- Region served: Antigua and Barbuda | Costa Rica | Dominican Republic | Egypt | Indonesia | Japan | Jordan | Malaysia | Philippines | Thailand | Vietnam | Maldives | Palau | Singapore | Timor-Leste
- Products: Green Fins membership, Green Fins e-courses, Green Fins educational materials
- Parent organization: The Reef-World Foundation
- Website: www.greenfins.net

Green Fins is an approach to sustainable marine tourism activities operating in Southeast Asia, Caribbean and the Indian Ocean that works with business operators, communities and governments. It helps to implement environmental standards for the diving and snorkelling industry through a code of conduct. The overall aim of the initiative is to mitigate damaging impacts to the marine environment from the marine tourism sector and improve sustainability. The code of conduct is a set of 15 points designed to tackle the most common and detrimental effects of scuba diving and snorkelling activities on the habitat in which they operate.

== The Green Fins Approach ==
Dive centres and snorkel tour operators sign a membership form pledging to adhere to the Code of Conduct. Trained Green Fins assessors visit members annually to assess their compliance to the Code of Conduct and provide consultations for improvement, and environmental training to all staff at the member centre to support and build the capacity of those individuals to reduce their environmental impacts. Members often receive printed materials to support their efforts to reduce impacts to the marine environment including the Green Fins icons, which visually outline best practices for divers and snorkellers. These materials are available in many different languages.

Divers coming into contact with coral

== History ==
Green Fins was established in 2004 as an initiative by the United Nations Environmental Programme (UNEP) and was first implemented by the Secretariat of the Coordinating Body on the Seas of East Asia (COBSEA). Green Fins was initiated and coordinated by COBSEA's secretariat as part of the effort to increase public awareness with an overall aim to better management practices that will contribute to the conservation of coral reefs (and other associated marine ecosystems such as seagrass beds and mangroves) and reduce current unsustainable tourism practices.

== Present ==
Currently there are 15 active member countries of the Green Fins initiative with Singapore also supporting the initiative. Thailand and the Philippines started in 2004, Indonesia in 2007 and Malaysia in 2008, the Maldives and Vietnam starting in 2013 and the Dominican Republic in 2018. Each individual country is autonomous, running the approach to their governments own targets and objectives to fulfil the mission statement. This is done under the supervision of the Network Leader with the Network Leader Assistant as a supporting role. The position of the Network Leader is usually fulfilled by government staff who work under a relevant department overseeing the protection and control of either marine habitats or tourism.

The initiative is spearheaded by the UK charity, The Reef-World Foundation. Their role as International Coordinators of the project is to assist countries with capacity-building and technical assistance under the direction of UNEP whilst helping to promote the countries various projects and successes on a global scale. In addition to this, Reef-World are also tasked with looking for additional funding to support the implementation and continued training of those that manage Green Fins in their respective countries. The Reef-World Foundation developed the Green Environmental Assessment Rating System (GEARS) to enable a results-based management approach through the Green Fins assessments that take place. The GEARS system allows a simple monitoring system that is able to measure the success of several objectives or milestones required to reach the overall goal enabling a results-based management approach. It does this with a green/yellow/red rating system, based on a weighted score for each objective, allowing for industry wide problems to be easily isolated and monitored.

In December 2012, The Reef-World Foundation in partnership with UNEP was successfully awarded a grant through the IUCN Mangroves for the Future Regional initiative. This saw the Green Fins network expand to Vietnam and the Maldives over a two-year project ending in November 2014.

In April 2013 a research paper was accepted by the scientific journal Ocean and Coastal Management titled "The Green Fins approach for monitoring and promoting environmentally sustainable scuba diving operations in South East Asia" and was published in Volume 78, June 2013, pages 35–44. The authors of this paper are from The Reef-World Foundation with co-authors from Green Fins Thailand based at the Phuket Marine Biological Centre (PMBC), Phuket, Thailand.

January 2014 saw the launch of the Green Fins website, which aims to provide a platform of information for Green Fins members, volunteers and coordinators of the initiate, government staff who help manage the project in their country and the general public who can download materials (posters, videos, leaflets, guidelines) to help provide educational information to divers, snorkellers and dive centre staff. The website also provides tourists the chance to search for Green Fins members and to view the environmental scores of diving areas as an average, helping them to decide which are the most environmentally friendly businesses and areas to dive or snorkel in.

In 2019, Egypt announced its adoption of the Green Fins initiative, in the South Sinai Governorate from September 2019 and in the Red Sea Governorate from March 2020.

The Green Fins initiative is free to join and all dive operators have the opportunity to be involved in the approach to help in battling to reduce their negative impacts. There are no costs involved in joining but members are expected to enter into the spirit that they can always improve their management policies in an effort to adhere to the Code of Conduct and protect the marine environment.

== Outreach and Environmental Activities ==
Green Fins encourages dive centres to engage staff, tourists, local businesses and communities in environmental activities such as beach and reef clean ups. Reef monitoring is also promoted, Green Fins does not endorse a particular methodology leaving it to the choice of the dive centre depending on the resources available to them.

Several spin-off projects may be run alongside the annual assessments to further promote marine conservation, these have included 'Say No to Plastic' awareness campaigns, shark awareness with local communities and schools, and marine conservation education programs with local fishing communities. In 2012, Green Fins ran the first Green Fins Ambassador Program in Puerto Galera, Oriental Mindoro, Philippines. The program works with the most enthusiastic dive guides in the area, providing them with additional environmental training and encouraging these individuals to be environmental ambassadors within the diving, and surrounding communities. The pilot program was a huge success and has now been replicated in Moalboal and Malapascua, Cebu, Philippines, with plans to reach out to other diving locations.

Green Fins flag
