= Marine conservation =

Protection and preservation of saltwater ecosystems

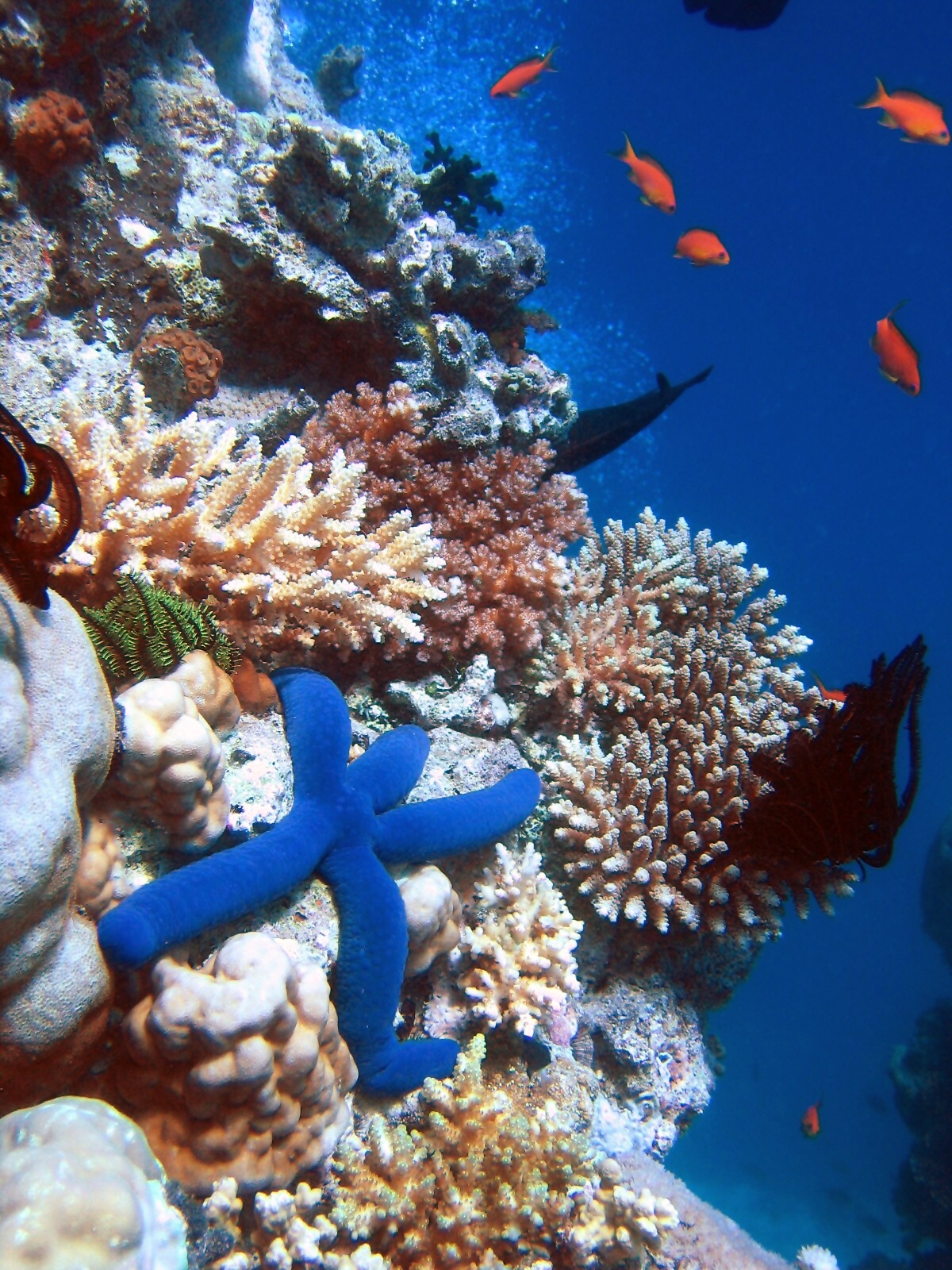
Coral reefs have a great amount of biodiversity.

Marine conservation, also known as ocean conservation, is the protection and preservation of ecosystems in oceans and seas through planned management in order to prevent the over-exploitation of these marine resources. Marine conservation is informed by the study of marine plants and animal resources and ecosystem functions and is driven by response to the manifested negative effects seen in the environment such as species loss, habitat degradation and changes in ecosystem functions and focuses on limiting human-caused damage to marine ecosystems, restoring damaged marine ecosystems, and preserving vulnerable species and ecosystems of the marine life. Marine conservation is a relatively new discipline which has developed as a response to biological issues such as extinction and marine habitats change.

Marine conservationists rely on a combination of scientific principles derived from marine biology, Ecology, oceanography, and fisheries science, as well as on human factors, such as demand for marine resources, maritime law, economics, and policy, in order to determine how to best protect and conserve marine species and ecosystems. Marine conservation may be described as a sub-discipline of conservation biology.

== History ==
Public interest in marine biology increased in the post-war years with the publication of Rachel Carson`s sea trilogy (1941–1955); which helped inspire an era known as the "marine revolution". The United States federal legislation showed its support for marine conservation by institutionalizing protected areas and creating marine estuaries. In 1969, the Coastal Maine National Wildlife Refuge was renamed the Rachel Carson National Wildlife Refuge, highlighting Carson's contribution. The refuge protects various kinds of habitat, including barrier beach, dune, tidal estuary, salt marsh, and rocky coastline.

However, it wasn't until the 1970s that the modern science of marine conservation would become first recognised, with undersea explorations equipped with new technologies, such as computers, being undertaken at the end of the decade. During these explorations, fundamental principles of change were discovered about marine ecosystems. Through this discovery, the interdependent nature of the ocean was revealed.

This led to a change in the approach of marine conservation efforts, and a new emphasis was put on restoring systems within the environment, along with protecting biodiversity. In 1972 Marine Protection, Research, and Sanctuaries Act (MPRSA) was passed, beginning the marine conservation movement. The act allowed the regulation by the United States Environmental Protection Agency (EPA) over dumping in the seas. Although the act was later amended, it was one of several key events that brought marine issues to the forefront of environmental concerns in the United States.

In 2009, Sylvia Earle received the million dollar TED prize which led to the foundation of Mission Blue (also known as the Sylvia Earle Alliance, Deep Search Foundation, and Deep Search). Mission Blue aims to establish marine protected areas (dubbed "Hope Spots") around the globe with the support of more than two hundred organisations. These supporters range from large, global companies to small, bespoke research teams.

That same year Earle also published 'The World is Blue: How Our Fate and the Ocean's Are One', widely acclaimed as being 'a Silent Spring for our era'; in which Earle reveals how just 50 years of swift and dangerous oceanic change threatens the very existence of life on Earth. Sylvia Earle life work has also been shaped directly by Rachel Carson, whose talent she rhapsodizes about in the Introduction to the 2018 edition of Carson’s 1951 best-seller, The Sea Around Us:

“Most remarkable to me is what she did imagine. Her writings are so sensitive to the feelings of fish, birds and other animals that she could put herself in their place, buoyed by the air or by water, gliding over and under the ocean’s surface. She conveyed the sense that she was the living ocean…”

In 2010, over 100 scientists, business leaders, philanthropists, and entertainment icons came together to support Dr. Sylvia Earle’s Mission Blue wish, and the following year, Gigi Brisson founded a group of Ocean Elders with the goal of unifying scientists with government and entertainment leaders.

== Notable people ==
- Rachel Carson: Marine biologist, Writer, Environmental Campaigner
- Jacques Cousteau: Explorer, Conservationist, Researcher & Author
- Sylvia Earle: Marine Biologist, Explorer, & Author
- Steve Irwin: Naturalist, Conservationist, Zoologist, Herpetologist, & Television Personality

"Although man’s record as a steward of the natural resources of the earth has been a discouraging one, there has long been a certain comfort in the belief that the sea, at least, was inviolate, beyond man’s ability to change and to despoil. But this belief, unfortunately, has proved to be naïve".

— Rachel Carson, The Sea Around Us,(1951)

== Human impacts on marine ecosystems ==
If the oceans die, we all die. – Paul Watson

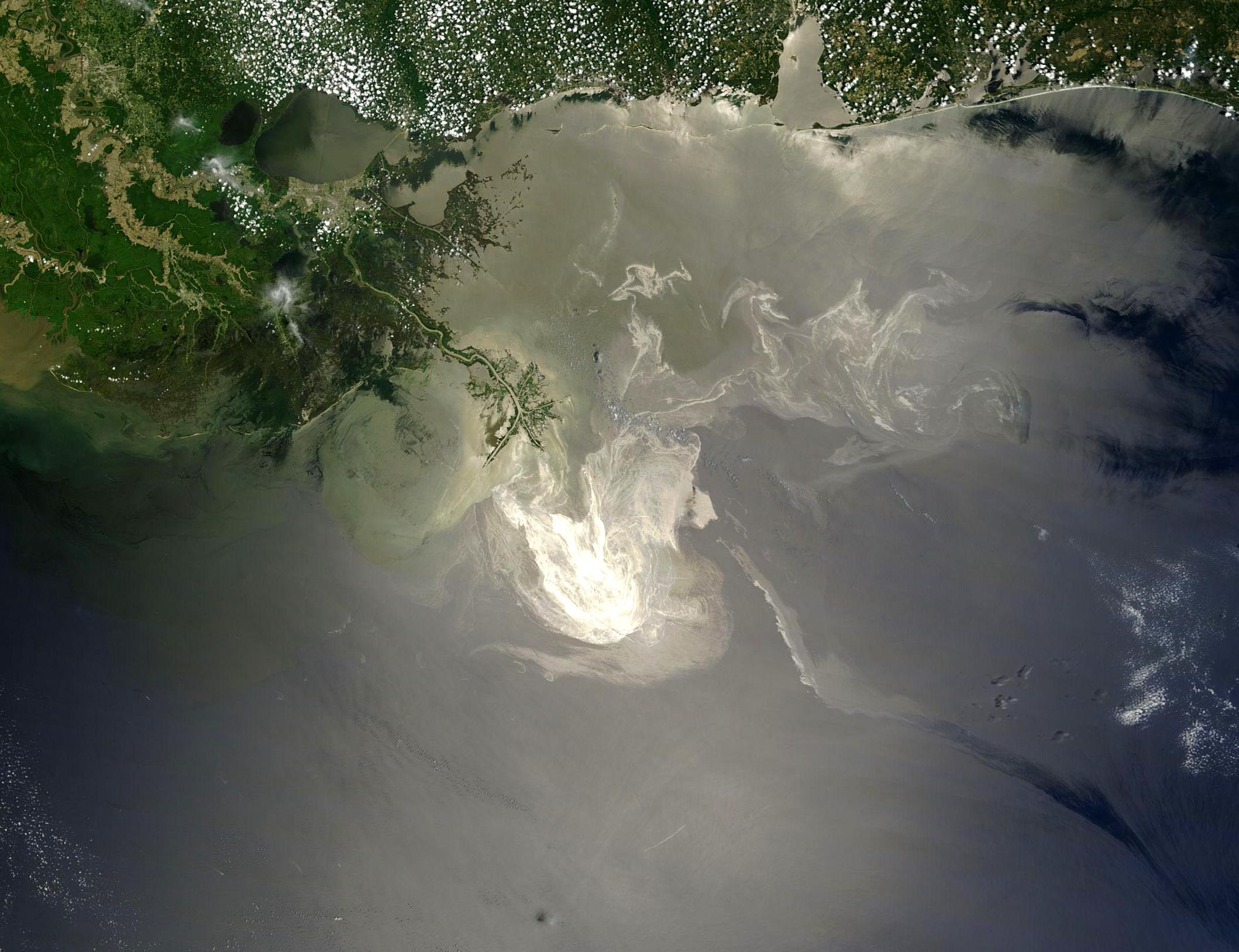
Oil spills have a significant impact on the marine environment such as this image from space of the Deepwater Horizon oil spill in the Gulf of Mexico.

Increasing human populations have resulted in increased human impact on ecosystems. Human activities has resulted in an increased extinction rate of species which has caused a major decrease in biological diversity of plants and animals in our environment. These impacts include increased pressure from fisheries including reef degradation and overfishing as well as pressure from the tourism industry which has increased over the past few years. The deterioration of coral reefs is mainly linked to human activities – 88% of reefs are threatened through various reasons as listed above, including excessive amounts of CO_{2} (carbon dioxide) emissions. Oceans absorb approximately 1/3 of the CO_{2} produced by humans, which has detrimental effects on the marine environment. The increasing levels of CO_{2} in oceans change the seawater chemistry by decreasing the pH, which is known as ocean acidification.

Oil spills also impact marine environments, contributing to marine pollution as a result of human activity. The effects of oil on marine fish have been studied following major spills in the United States.

Shipping is a major vector for the introduction of exotic marine species, some of which can become overabundant and transform ecosystems. Collisions with ships can also be fatal for whales and can impact on the viability of whole populations, including the right whale population off the east coast of the United States.

=== Coral reefs ===
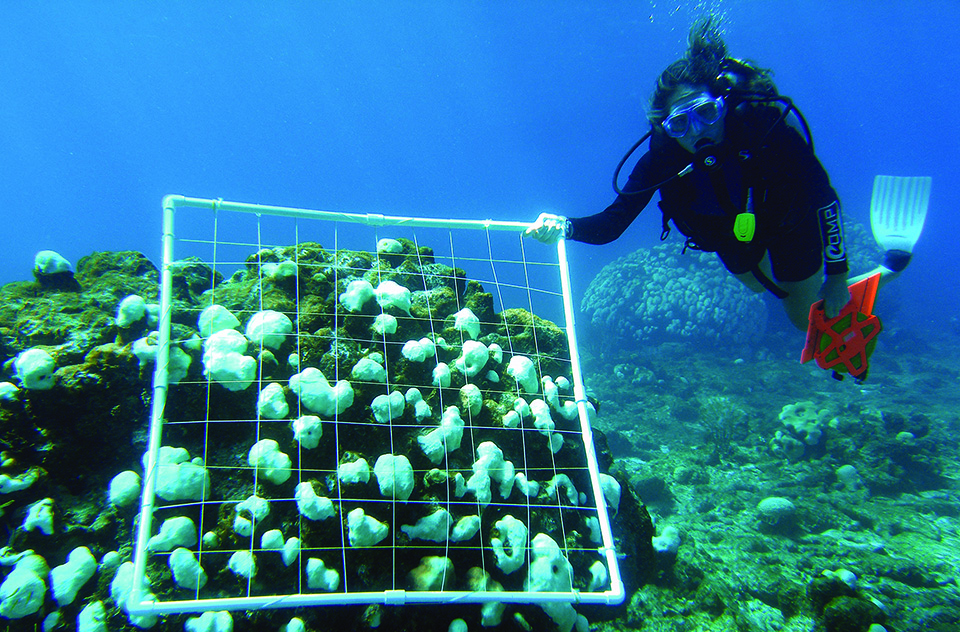
NOAA scuba diver surveying bleached corals.

Coral reefs are the epicenter of immense amounts of biodiversity and are a key player in the survival of entire ecosystems. They provide various marine animals with food, protection, and shelter which keep generations of species alive. Furthermore, coral reefs are an integral part of sustaining human life through serving as a food source (i.e., fish and mollusks) as well as a marine space for ecotourism which provides economic benefits. Also, humans are now conducting research regarding the use of corals as new potential sources for pharmaceuticals (i.e. steroids and anti-inflammatory drugs).

Because of the human impact on coral reefs, these ecosystems are becoming increasingly degraded and in need of conservation. The biggest threats include overfishing, destructive fishing practices, sedimentation, and pollution from land-based sources. This, in conjunction with increased carbon in oceans, coral bleaching, and diseases, means that there are no pristine reefs anywhere in the world. Up to 88% of coral reefs in Southeast Asia are now threatened, with 50% of those reefs at either "high" or "very high" risk of disappearing, which directly affects the biodiversity and survival of species dependent on coral.

This is especially harmful to island nations such as Samoa, Indonesia, and the Philippines, because many people there depend on the coral reef ecosystems to feed their families and to make a living. However, many fishermen are unable to catch as many fish as they used to, so they are increasingly using cyanide and dynamite in fishing, which further degrades the coral reef ecosystem. This perpetuation of bad habits simply leads to the further decline of coral reefs and therefore perpetuates the problem. One way of stopping this cycle is by educating the local community about why the conservation of marine spaces that include coral reefs is important.

=== Overfishing ===
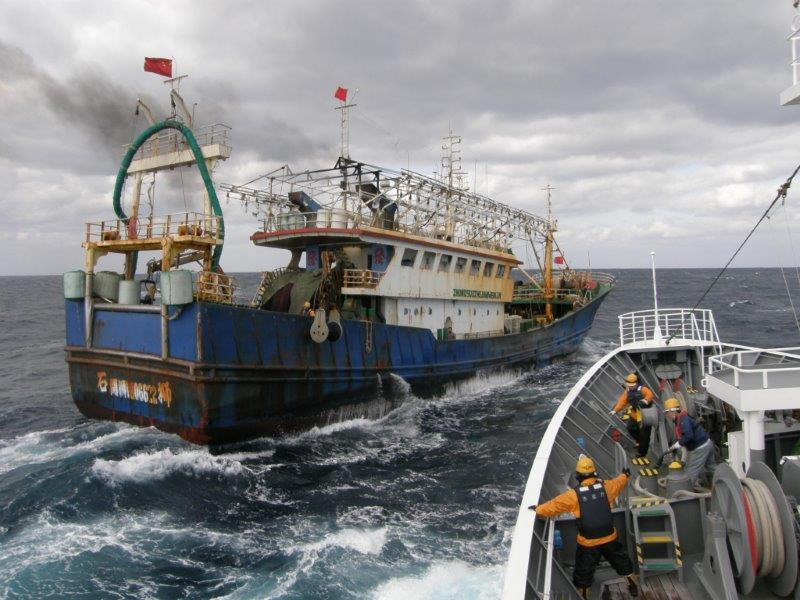
Illegal, unreported and unregulated fishing (IUU) being prevented by a Japanese fisheries patrol.

Overfishing is one of main causes of the decrease in the ocean's wildlife population over the past years. The Food and Agriculture Organization of the United Nation reported that the percentage of the world's fish stocks that are at biologically sustainable levels have decreased from 90% in 1974 to 65.8% in 2017. The overfishing of these large fisheries destroys the marine environment and threatens the livelihood of billions who depend on fish as protein or as a source of income for catching and selling.

According to the World Wildlife Fund, illegal, unreported, and unregulated fishing is a major factor in overfishing. Illegal fishing is estimated to account for up to 30% of the catch for some high-value species, and the industry is estimated to be worth $36 billion per year.

According to The Hidden Nursery: How Baby Great White Sharks Are Revitalizing New York’s Marine Ecosystem, while the great white sharks baby population is increasing from New York City to the tip of Long Island, recent overfishing has started to cause the young vulnerable sharks to swim into dangerous waters off Martha Vineyard and Cape Cod where adult Great Whites are picking them off before they can mature. If Overfishing continues, we may see a population drop again soon.

=== Overabundance ===
Overabundance can occur when the population of a certain species cannot be controlled naturally or by human intervention. The domination of one species can create an imbalance in an ecosystem, which can lead to the demise of other species and of the habitat. Overabundance occurs predominately among invasive species.

Overfishing can contribute to overabundance due to eliminating an ecosystem's natural predator. This disrupts the natural food chain and allows species to grow without regulation. Not only does this create overpopulation with specific species, but it also makes changes within the structure of the environments ecosystem.

==== Introduced species ====
The international shipping trade has led to the establishment of many marine species beyond their native ranges. Some of these can have adverse consequences, such as the North pacific seastar which was introduced to Tasmania, Australia. Vectors for the translocation of organisms include hull biofouling, the dumping of ballast water and dumping of water from marine aquaria. A tank of ballast water is estimated to contain around 3,000 non-native species. Once established, it is difficult to eradicate an exotic organism from an ecosystem.

The San Francisco Bay is one of the places in the world that is the most impacted by foreign and invasive species. According to the Baykeeper organization, 97 percent of the organisms in the San Francisco Bay have been compromised by the 240 invasive species that have been brought into the ecosystem. Invasive species in the bay such as the Asian clam have changed the food web of the ecosystem by depleting populations of native species such as plankton. The Asian clam clogs pipes and obstructs the flow of water in electrical generating facilities. Their presence in the San Francisco Bay has cost the United States an estimated one billion dollars in damages.

Conservation practices have been put in place in order to address these invasive species. In order to diminish the impact humans have had to the environment, countries established stronger policies and regulations, particularly within their shipping practices like ballast water discharge. These practices can allow non-native species to disperse into new environments and disrupt the already established ecosystems.

== Extinct and endangered species ==
=== Marine mammals ===
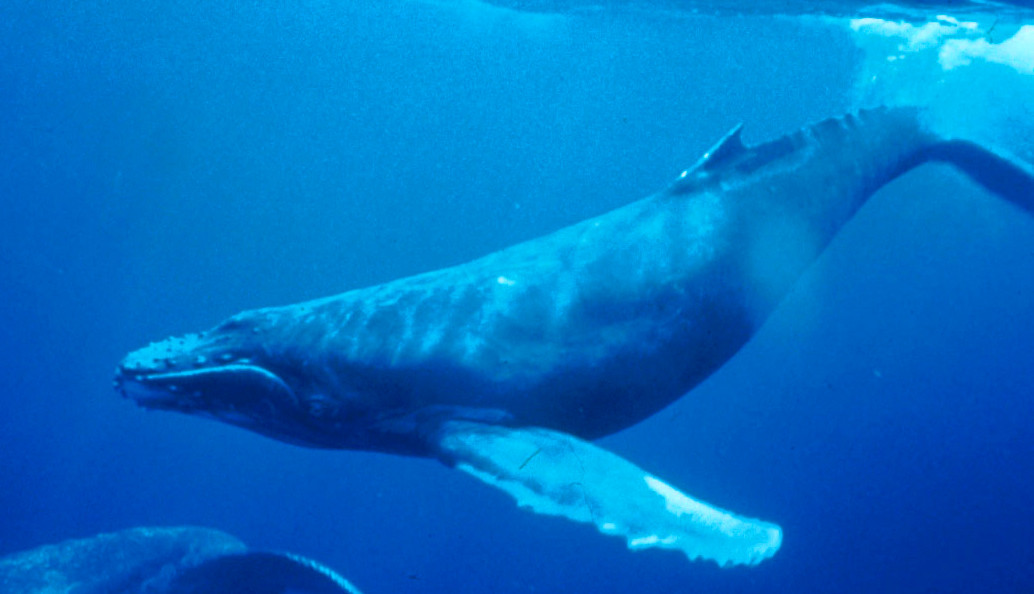
Whales were close to extinction until legislation was put in place.

Baleen whales were predominantly hunted from 1600 through the mid-1900s, and were nearing extinction when a global ban on commercial whaling was put into effect in 1986 by the IWC (International Whaling Convention). The Atlantic gray whale, last sighted in 1740, is now extinct due to European and Native American whaling. Since the 1960s the global population of monk seals has been rapidly declining. The Hawaiian and Mediterranean monk seals are considered to be one of the most endangered marine mammals on the planet, according to the NOAA. The last sighting of the Caribbean monk seal was in 1952, and it has now been confirmed extinct by the NOAA. The vaquita porpoise, discovered in 1958, has become the most endangered marine species. Over half the population has disappeared since 2012, leaving 100 left in 2014. The vaquita frequently drowns in fishing nets, which are used illegally in marine protected areas off the Gulf of Mexico.

=== Sea turtles ===
In 2004, the Marine Turtle Specialist Group (MTSG), from the International Union for Conservation of Nature (IUCN), ran an assessment which determined that green turtles were globally endangered. Population decline in ocean basins is indicated through data collected by the MTSG that analyzes abundance and historical information on the species. This data examined the global population of green turtles at 32 nesting sites, and determined that over the last 100–150 years there has been a 48–65 percent decrease in the number of mature nesting females. The Kemp's ridley sea turtle population fell in 1947 when 33,000 nests, which accounted for 80 percent of the population, were collected and sold by villagers in Racho Nuevo, Mexico. In the early 1960s only 5,000 individuals were left, and between 1978 and 1991, 200 Kemp's Ridley Turtles nested annually. In 2015, the World Wildlife Fund and National Geographic Magazine named the Kemp's ridley the most endangered sea turtle in the world, with 1000 females nesting annually.

=== Fish ===
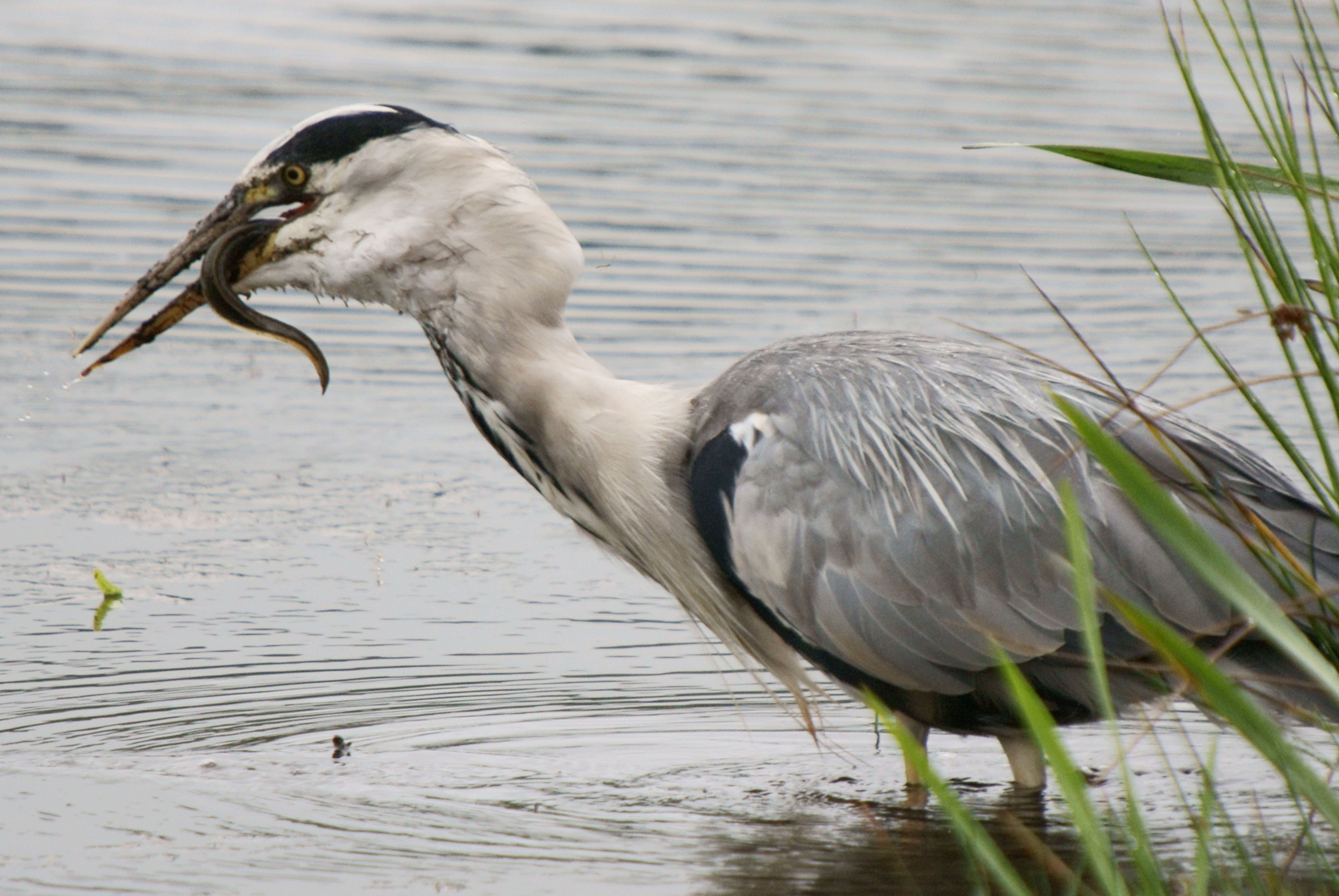
The European eel being critically endangered impacts other animals such as this Grey Heron that also eats eels.

In 2014, the IUCN moved the Pacific bluefin tuna from "least concerned" to "vulnerable" on a scale that represents level of extinction risk. The Pacific bluefin tuna is targeted by the fishing industry mainly for its use in sushi. A stock assessment released in 2013 by the International Scientific Committee for Tuna and Tuna-Like Species in the North Pacific Ocean (ISC) shows that the Pacific bluefin tuna population dropped by 96 percent in the Pacific Ocean. According to the ISC assessment, 90 percent of the Pacific bluefin tuna caught are juveniles that have not reproduced.

Between 2011 and 2014, the European eel, Japanese eel, and American eel were put on the IUCN red list of endangered species. In 2015, the Environmental Agency concluded that the number of European eels has declined by 95 percent since 1990. An Environmental Agency officer, Andy Don, who has been researching eels for the past 20 years, said, "There is no doubt that there is a crisis. People have been reporting catching a kilo of glass eels this year when they would expect to catch 40 kilos. We have got to do something."

=== Marine plants ===
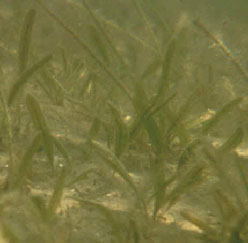
Seagrass, like Johnson's seagrass, provides a balance and stability to ecosystems within marine life.

Johnson's seagrass, a food source for the endangered green sea turtle, reproduces asexually, which limits its ability to populate and colonize habitats. This seagrass was formerly the only marine plant to be listed under the US Endangered Species Act, and in 1998, it was granted protection as an endangered species. It is now known to be a clone of the widespread Halophila ovalis and protection was withdrawn. Data on this plant is limited, but it is known that since the 1970s there has been a 50 percent decrease in abundance. There are many reasons behind the decline in the seagrass's proliferation, such as degradation of water quality, careless boating activities, anchoring. In addition to that hurricane activity caused by climate change, increase the risk of extinction.

Seagrass habitats play an essential role with keeping balance in marine life. It gives stability to the ecosystem by providing a habitat for species and sustaining the water's quality. However, while these habitats create a balance to ecosystems, they continue to experience a decline due to human interaction like pollution, climate change, and destruction of habitats. These human interactions are a contributing factor as to why marine life has been declining throughout the years.

== Techniques ==
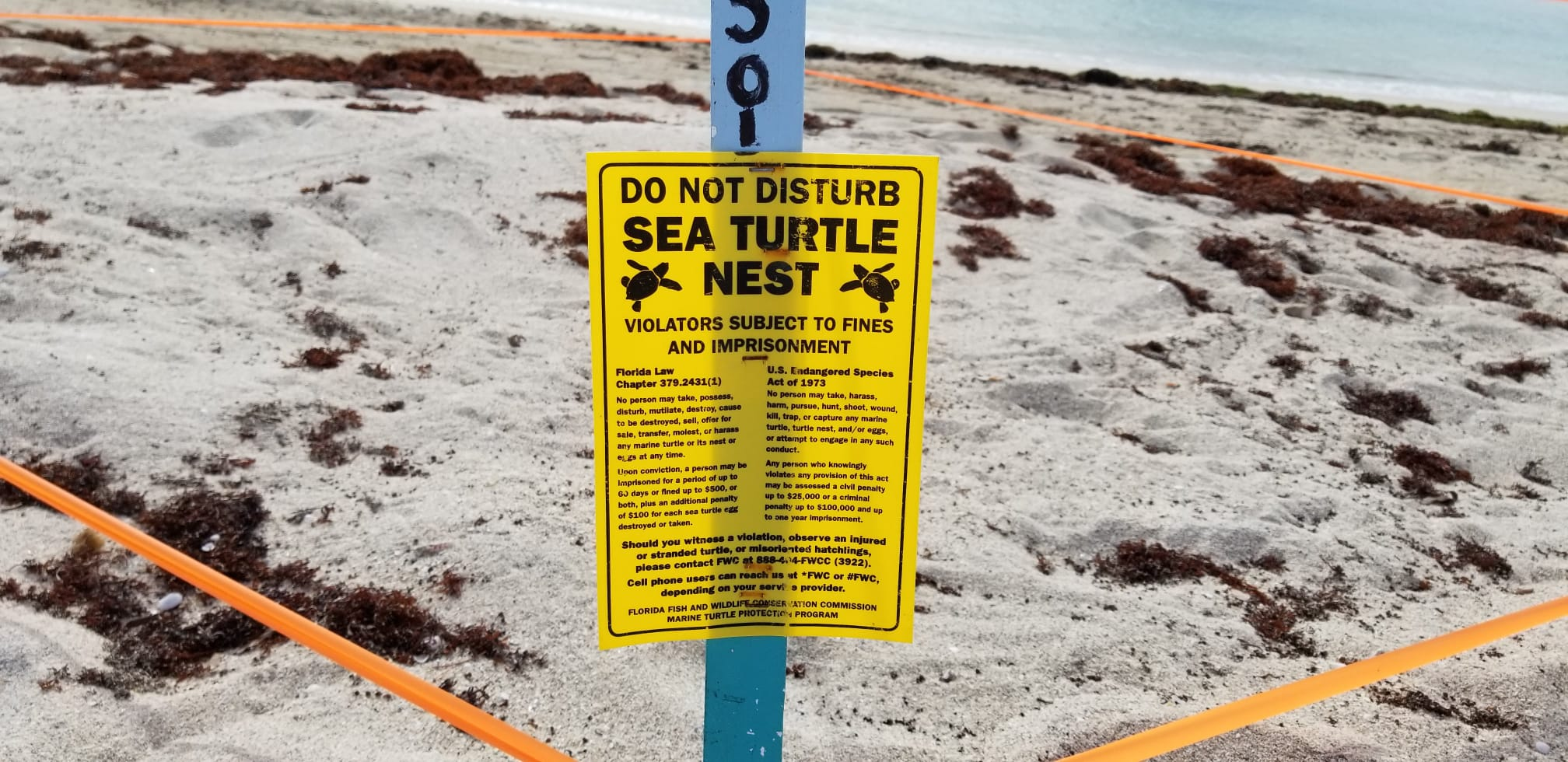
A protected sea turtle area that warns of fines and imprisonment on a beach in Miami, Florida.

Strategies and techniques for marine conservation tend to combine theoretical disciplines, such as population biology, with practical conservation strategies, such as setting up protected areas, as with marine protected areas (MPAs) or Voluntary Marine Conservation Areas. These protected areas may be established for a variety of reasons and aim to limit the impact of human activity. These protected areas operate differently which includes areas that have seasonal closures and/or permanent closures as well as multiple levels of zoning that allow people to carryout different activities in separate areas; including, speed, no take and multi-use zones. Other techniques include developing sustainable fisheries and restoring the populations of endangered species through artificial means.

Another focus of conservationists is on curtailing human activities that are detrimental to either marine ecosystems or species through policy, techniques such as fishing quotas, like those set up by the Northwest Atlantic Fisheries Organization, or laws such as those listed below. Recognizing the economics involved in human use of marine ecosystems is key, as is education of the public about conservation issues. This includes educating tourists that come to an area who might not be familiar with certain regulations regarding the marine habitat. One example of this is a project called Green Fins based in Southeast Asia that uses the scuba diving industry to educate the public. This project, implemented by UNEP, encourages scuba diving operators to educate their students about the importance of marine conservation and encourage them to dive in an environmentally friendly manner that does not damage coral reefs or associated marine ecosystems.

Scientists divide the process by a few parts, and there are various techniques in each part of it. In marking and capturing, the normal techniques include techniques for restraint in pinnipeds, chemical restraint and immobilization in pinnipeds, techniques for capture-release of cetaceans and techniques for restraint and handling. Recently, some novel approaches include remote sensing techniques to model exposure of coastal-marine ecosystems to riverine flood plumes and advanced iconography.

Techniques also include many social science-based methods. Many researchers have found the effectiveness of marine conservation through change caused by social events and encourage sustainable tourism development to raise the public awareness of it. Researchers suggest integrating customary management into marine conservation and emphasize that practical and conceptual differences exist between customary management and contemporary conservation which have often led to failed attempts to hybridize these systems. Others have suggested to integrate marine conservation and tourism, the establishment of conservation areas can help reduce conflicts. Zoning the protected areas enables the grouping of compatible areas into specific zones and the separation of incompatible areas. Common techniques to raise the general public's attention also include exposure to the concept of the carbon footprint and to educate people to make sustainable food choices and use fewer plastic products.

== Technology and halfway technology ==
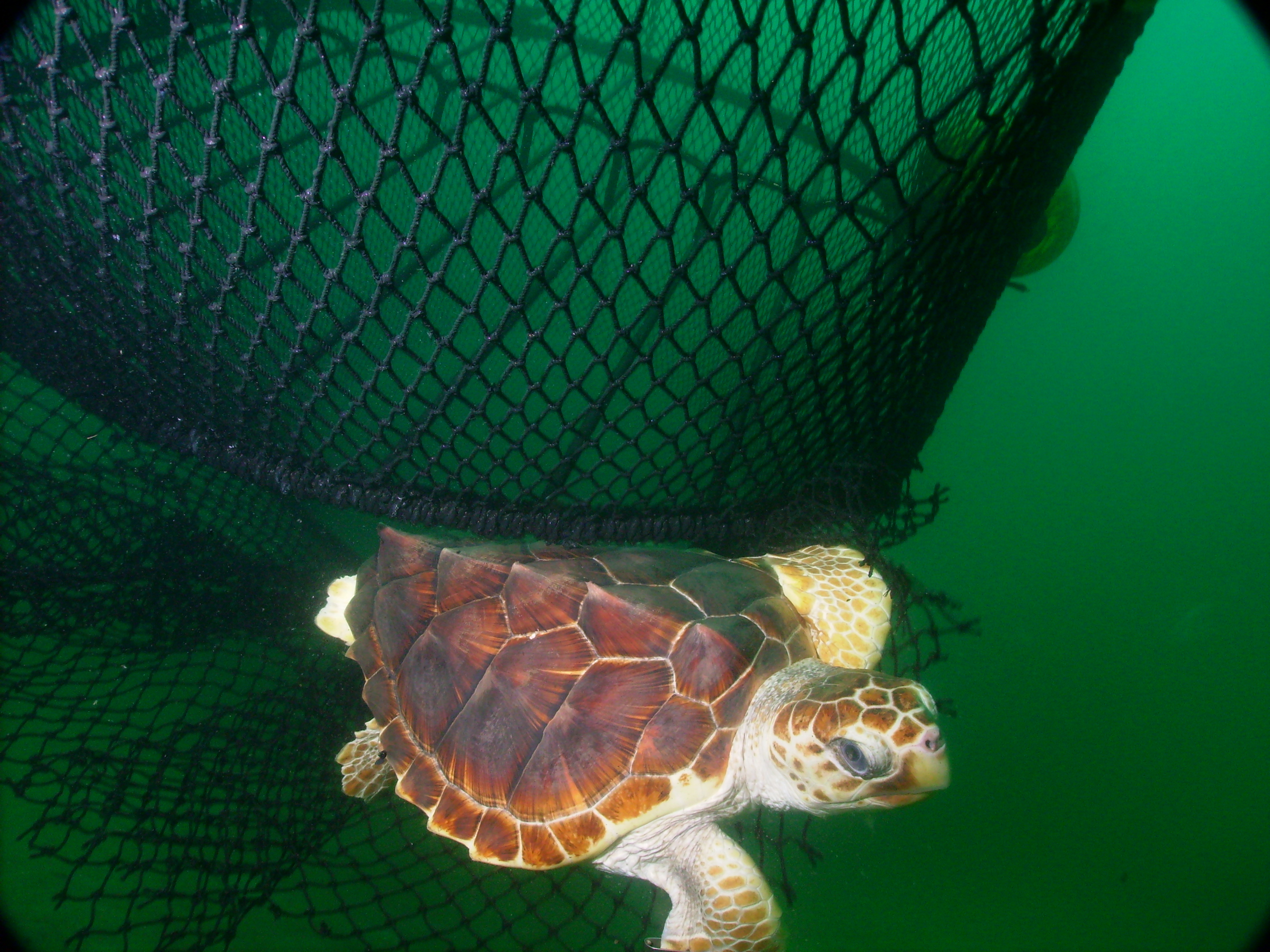
Technology such as this turtle excluder device (TED) allows this loggerhead sea turtle to escape.

Marine conservation technologies are used to protect endangered and threatened marine organisms and/or habitat. These technologies are innovative and revolutionary because they reduce by-catch, increase the survivorship and health of marine life and habitat, and benefit fishermen who depend on the resources for profit. Examples of technologies include marine protected areas (MPAs), turtle excluder devices (TEDs), autonomous recording unit, pop-up satellite archival tag, and radio-frequency identification (RFID). Commercial practicality plays an important role in the success of marine conservation because it is necessary to cater to the needs of fishermen while also protecting marine life.

Pop-up satellite archival tag (PSAT or PAT) plays a vital role in marine conservation by providing marine biologists with an opportunity to study animals in their natural environments. These are used to track movements of (usually large, migratory) marine animals. A PSAT is an archival tag (or data logger) that is equipped with a means to transmit the collected data via satellite. Though the data are physically stored on the tag, its major advantage is that it does not have to be physically retrieved like an archival tag for the data to be available, making it a viable independent tool for animal behavior studies. These tags have been used to track movements of ocean sunfish, marlin, blue sharks, bluefin tuna, swordfish and sea turtles. Location, depth, temperature, and body movement data are used to answer questions about migratory patterns, seasonal feeding movements, daily habits, and survival after catch and release.

Turtle excluder devices (TEDs) remove a major threat to turtles in their marine environment. Many sea turtles are accidentally captured, injured or killed by fishing. In response to this threat the National Oceanic and Atmospheric Administration (NOAA) worked with the shrimp trawling industry to create the TEDs. By working with the industry they insured the commercial viability of the devices. A TED is a series of bars that is placed at the top or bottom of a trawl net, fitting the bars into the "neck" of the shrimp trawl and acting as a filter to ensure that only small animals may pass through. The shrimp will be caught but larger animals such as marine turtles that become caught by the trawler will be rejected by the filter function of the bars.

Similarly, halfway technologies work to increase the population of marine organisms. However, they do so without behavioral changes, and address the symptoms but not the cause of the declines. Examples of halfway technologies include hatcheries and fish ladders.

== Laws and treaties ==
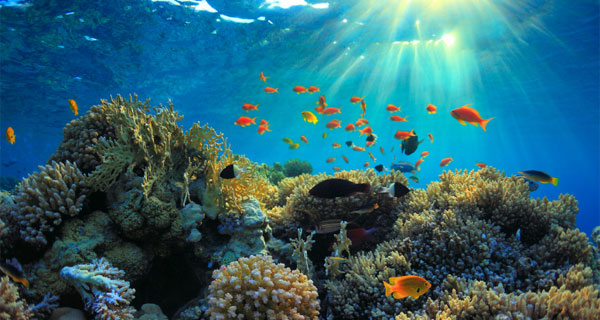
Marine protected areas are one area of legislation that helps marine ecosystems to thrive.

International laws and treaties related to marine conservation include the 1966 Convention on Fishing and Conservation of Living Resources of the High Seas. United States laws related to marine conservation include the 1972 Marine Mammal Protection Act, as well as the 1972 Marine Protection, Research and Sanctuaries Act, which established the National Marine Sanctuaries program.

In 2010, the Scottish Parliament enacted new legislation for the protection of marine life with the Marine (Scotland) Act 2010. Its provisions include marine planning, marine licensing, marine conservation, seal conservation, and enforcement.

Since 2006, United Nations introduce vulnerable marine ecosystem concept for the management of deep-sea fisheries in the areas beyond national jurisdiction. This concept has been transposed by the European parliament for Atlantic European waters.

The United Nations Convention on the Law of the Sea establishes guidelines for all uses of the oceans' resources and establishes a comprehensive regime of law and order in the world's oceans and seas. On December 10, 1982, the convention was made available for signature at Montego Bay, Jamaica. More than 150 nations representing all world regions, all legal and political systems, and the full range of socio-economic development participated. The Convention introduced new legal concepts, addressed new issues, and combined the conventional norms for the usage of the oceans into one document. The convention also established the framework for furthering the study of particular facets of maritime law. On November 16, 1994, the Convention came into effect in line with article 308. Today, it is the widely acknowledged system in charge of resolving all matters regarding the law of the sea. The Convention regulates all facets of ocean space, including delimitation, environmental control, marine scientific research, economic and commercial activity, transfer of technology, and the resolution of disputes pertaining to ocean issues. It has 320 articles and nine annexes.

The UN Environment Programme (UNEP) works to safeguard oceans and seas and encourage the wise use of marine resources, particularly through its Regional Seas Program. The sole international legal foundation for regional ocean and sea protection is the Regional Seas Conventions and Action Plans. The Global Programme of Action for the Protection of the Marine Environment from Land-based Activities was also established by UNEP. The relationship between terrestrial, freshwater, coastal, and marine ecosystems is directly addressed by it, which makes it the only international intergovernmental instrument to do so. Through the Intergovernmental Oceanographic Commission, the United Nations Educational, Scientific and Cultural Organization (UNESCO) organizes programs in marine research, observation systems, hazard mitigation, and better managing ocean and coastal ecosystems. The Organization is the originator of the Convention on the protection of the Underwater Cultural Heritage, the Global Ocean Observing System and UNESCO global geoparks. Around 1 800 quantifiable and monetary pledges totaling $108 billion have been obtained since 2017 for the UN Ocean Conference and the Our Ocean Conference.

At the 1998 Oslo and Paris Convention for the Protection of the Marine Environment of the North-East Atlantic, environmental ministers from 15 Northeast Atlantic states and members of the European Commission agreed to identify marine species, habitats, and ecosystems that need protection and to "promote the establishment of a network of marine protected areas to ensure the sustainable use, protection, and conservation of marine biological diversity.”

In June 2023, the High Seas Treaty was adopted by the UN to better protect marine environment and ecosystems in international waters. It needs ratification by at least 60 member states to enter into force.

=== Global goals ===
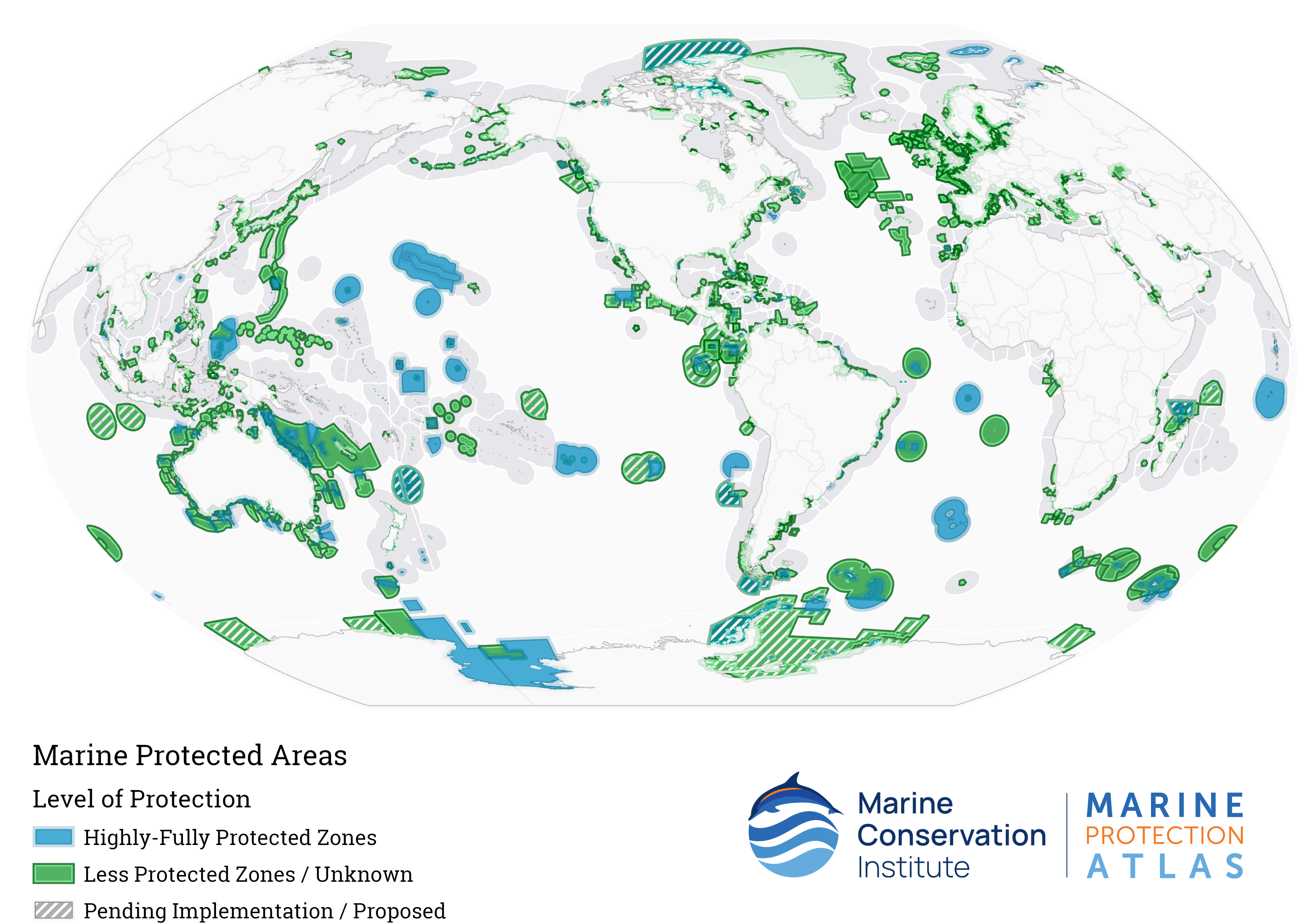
Areas around the world that focus on protecting biodiversity and population recovery.

Marine conservation is included in the United Nations framework of Sustainable Development Goals (SDGs), most notably in SDG 14 ("Life below water"). The text of Target 14.5 is: "By 2020, conserve at least 10 per cent of coastal and marine areas, consistent with national and international law and based on the best available scientific information". This target has one indicator: Indicator 14.5.1 is the "coverage of protected areas in relation to marine areas". The term "Marine Protected Areas" include marine reserves, fully protected marine areas, no-take zones, marine sanctuaries, ocean sanctuaries, marine parks, locally managed marine areas and other. Each area has a specific level of protection and a specific allowed range of activities.

Marine protected areas are a strategy used for marine conservation purposes due to their role in supporting biodiversity and recovery in populations. This strategy provides stability within ecosystems and contributes to their longevity by preventing destructive human impact. The United Nations addresses efforts towards marine conservation through their Sustainable Development Goals, with Sustainable Development Goal 14 particularly highlighting a target that's focus is to conserve around 10 percent of coastal and marine areas.

== Organizations ==
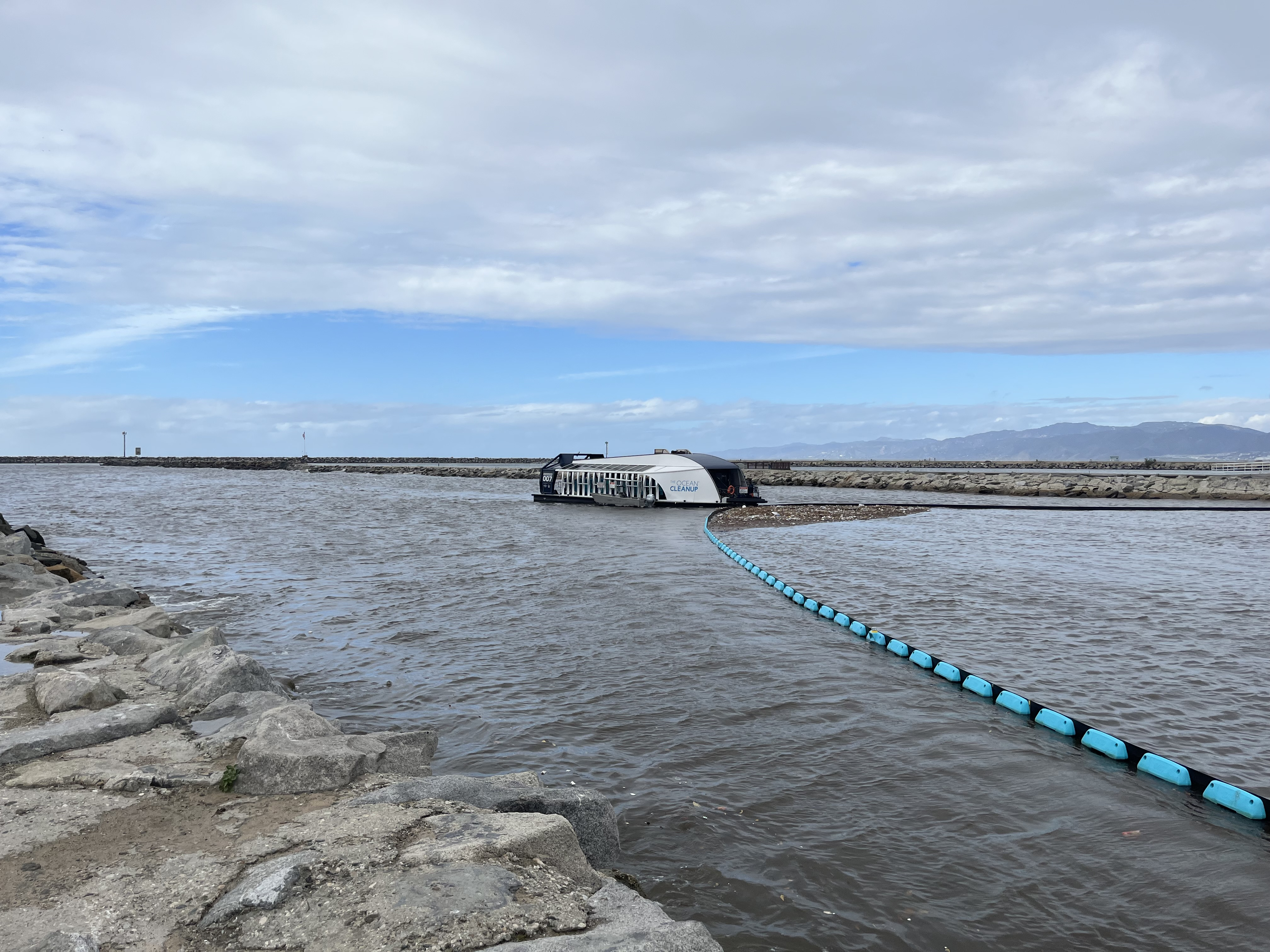
The Ocean Cleanup is one of many organizations working toward marine conservation such at this interceptor vessel that prevents plastic from entering the ocean.

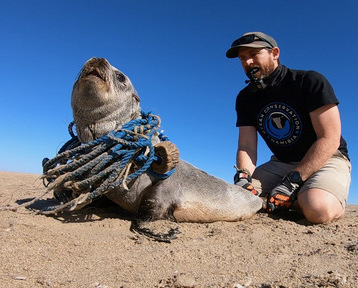
Ocean Conservation Namibia rescuing a seal that was entangled in discarded fishing nets.

There are marine conservation non-governmental organizations throughout the world that focus on funding conservation efforts, educating the public and stakeholders, and lobbying for conservation law and policy. Examples of these include:

- Ocean Wise (Canada)
- Oceana
- Blue Ventures
- Marine Conservation Society (United Kingdom)
- Fauna and Flora International
- Marine Conservation Institute (United States)
- Blue Frontier Campaign (United States)
- Sea Shepherd Conservation Society (international)
- Community Centered Conservation (C3)
- Reef-World Foundation (United Kingdom)
- Reef Watch (India)
- Marinelife Alliance (Bangladesh)
- Live Ocean (New Zealand)
- ProtectedSeas (United States)
- TerraMar (United States)
- Australian Marine Conservation Society
- Mission Blue, which leads the Hope Spots initiative
- Zoox (United Kingdom) is an example of an organization that provides both marine conservation training and professional career development to volunteers who are also working on marine conservation projects such as Green Fins.

On a regional level, PERSGA, the Regional Organization for the Conservation of the Environment of the Red Sea and the Gulf of Aden, is a regional entity which serves as the secretariat for the Jeddah Convention-1982, one of the first regional marine agreements. PERSGA member states are Djibouti, Egypt, Jordan, Saudi Arabia, Somalia, Sudan and Yemen.

=== Prominent campaigns ===
There have been a number of organized efforts from marine conservation groups such as those aforementioned in this article to raise awareness of the human impact on the situation and inspire people to take action. Some groups take on more public facing campaigns that directly attempt to get civilians engaged with the issue compared to other groups who encourage donations from civilians which goes towards lobbying and advocacy towards the government.

Ocean Conservancy and its International Coastal Cleanup is an example of a public-facing campaign that aims to increase participation in conservation efforts among every day civilians. On a predetermined date every year, Ocean Conservancy promotes The International Coastal Cleanup to rally communities to volunteer to collect trash from the coastlines across the globe. The campaign has expanded originally from its two founders and has now reached over 100 countries.

Oceana is an example of an advocacy/lobbying group that encourages donations as a means to enact legislation and protect the laws of the ocean. Specifically, Oceana is currently lobbying to prevent the expansion of offshore drilling with emphasis in areas such as the Arctic and Belize. Oceana is currently mentioned in a wide range of bills in the US Congress regarding issues such as anti-drilling protections on the Atlantic coast and the penalty for buying, selling, possessing, or transporting shark fins.

Greenpeace is another non-profit organization that seeks to campaign for a healthier environment and more sustainable environmental practices. While the organization addresses a wide range of topics outside of ocean conservation, it is currently focusing in on plastic pollution, sustainable seafood, and protecting the Arctic. They provide information online on their website regarding their current efforts which can help people get connected to the correct resources to make a difference in their community.

== Events and initiatives ==
There have been a wide variety of different events and initiatives to spread the message about the issue.

=== Events ===
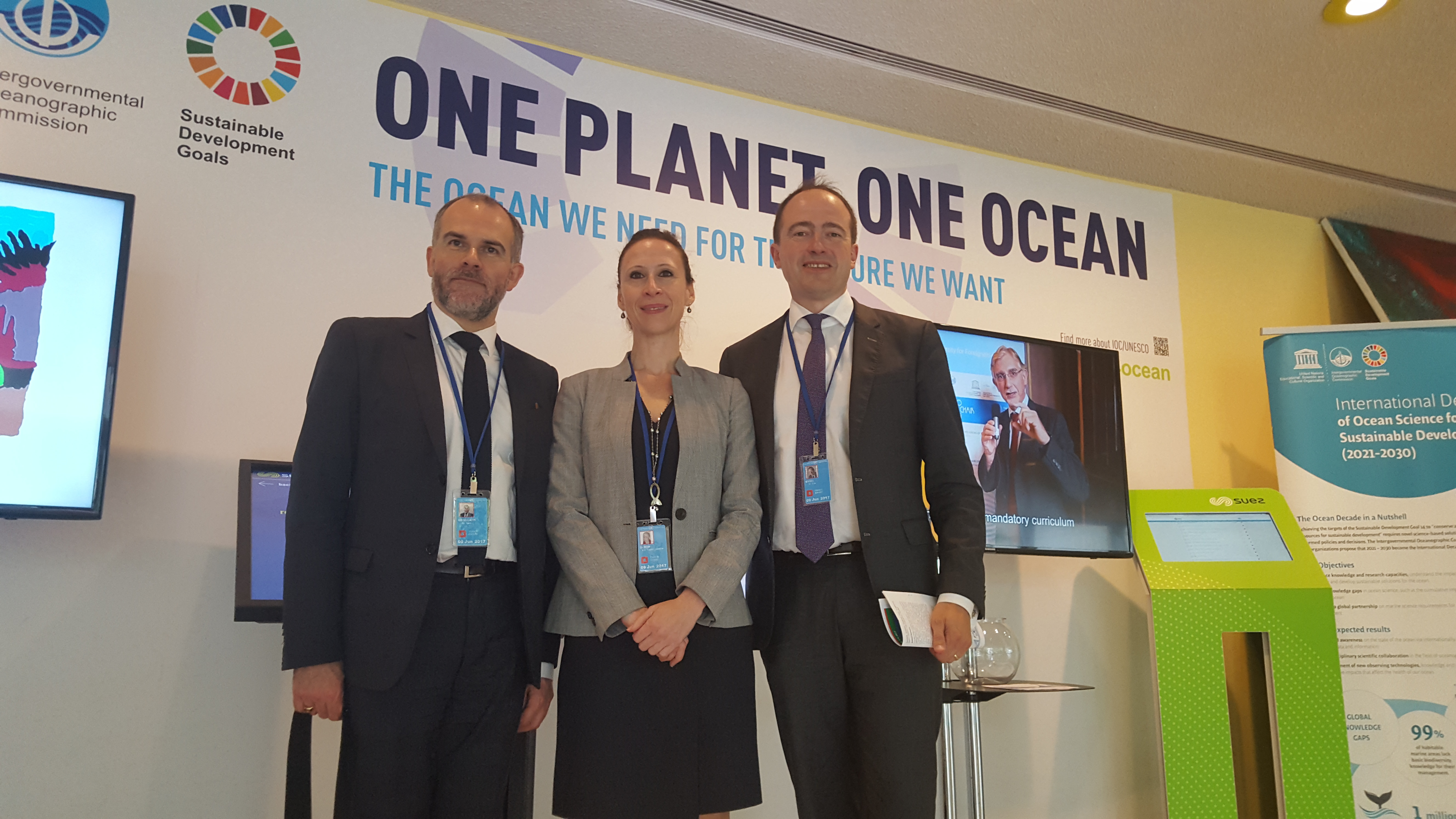
Conference events, such as the events hosted by the United Nations, help to bring together many stakeholders for awareness and action.

==== International Ocean Film Festival ====
This film festival is the largest ocean destination event according to the MCI. Also known as the IOFF, this event is a four-day film festival that includes over 50 films related to ocean-life around the globe. This event is made to educate viewers and the audience on the environmental issues that are negatively impacting the ocean. Films also include potential solutions to help protect the ocean and environment as well.

==== Rising Tide Summit ====
This summit is led by Boardriders Foundation, XPRIZE Foundation, and Marisla Foundation. The summit is more interactive as it provides a panel of speakers as well as a portion for questions and answers. Towards the latter half of the event, companies and individuals are able to participate in a workshop so they can learn more about the benefits of a “blue economy”. This event is centered towards the California population

=== Initiatives ===
#SaveOurOceans is a social media campaign that draws NGOs and social media platforms together in the form of a TikTok contest. TikTok has partnered with Conservation International to protect marine life. The #SaveOurOceans campaign was able to reach globally due to influencers spreading the message to a wide audience. Local and global influencers alike played a role in spreading the campaign. TikTok declared that they would donate $2 for every video uploaded with the hashtag, up to $100,000, towards protecting oceans and marine life by reducing plastic waste.

#SuitUpToCleanUp is another social media campaign centered around promoting marine conservation. Launched in August and September 2018 by Ocean Conservancy, the campaign was intended to inspire participants to clean up pollution in their local waterways. The campaign was meant to coincide with Ocean Conservancy's 33rd Annual International Coastal Cleanup (ICC) on September 15, 2018. The phrase #SuitUpToCleanUp was a way for people to share their stories of how they helped clean up in unique ways.

The Clean Oceans Initiative declared its intention to increase its financing aim to €4 billion by the end of 2025 during the One Ocean Conference in February 2022, at which the European Bank for Reconstruction and Development (EBRD) joined as the initiative's sixth member.

The Clean Oceans Initiative has contributed more than €2.7 billion in finance for 63 projects as of June 2023, accounting for more than 68% of its €4 billion objective. It is estimated that 20 million people or more will benefit from the projects under the initiative As of December 2023, the number grew to almost €3.2 billion, exceeding 80% of its €4 billion objective. Projects include better wastewater treatment in Sri Lanka, China, Egypt, and South Africa, solid waste management in Togo and Senegal, and stormwater management and flood protection in Benin, Morocco, and Ecuador.

== See also ==
- List of vulnerable arthropods
- List of critically endangered arthropods
- List of vulnerable invertebrates
- List of critically endangered invertebrates
- List of vulnerable fishes
- List of critically endangered fishes
