= Marine Conservation Institute =

US nonprofit organization

- Founded: 1996
- Purpose: Oceans, Marine protected area, habitat destruction, pollution, Coral Reefs, Seamounts, Blue Parks, Ocean Acidification, High Seas
- Location: Glen Ellen, California, United States
- Region served: Global
- Method: Scientific Research and Policy Advocacy
- Key people: Elliott Norse, Ph.D., Founder and Chief Scientist; Lance Morgan, Ph.D., President and CEO; Sylvia Earle, Ph.D., Board member
- Revenue: $1,792,140 (2011)
- Website: marine-conservation.org

Marine Conservation Institute (formerly Marine Conservation Biology Institute) is an American tax-exempt nonprofit ocean conservation organization working to identify and protect vulnerable ocean ecosystems worldwide. The organization is headquartered in Seattle, Washington, with an additional office in Glen Ellen, California.

Marine Conservation Institute is a U.S. based nonprofit organization. Marine Conservation Institute is a three-star Charity Navigator rated organization and a platinum-level participant at Guidestar.

== Previous names ==
Marine Conservation Biology Institute, 1996–2011

== History ==
Marine Conservation Institute was founded under the name Marine Conservation Biology Institute (MCBI) in 1996 by Dr. Elliott Norse, a biologist who had previously worked at the Council on Environmental Quality and the Ocean Conservancy.

MCBI's focus was initially to make connections between scientists and policymakers. In 2000 letter written to President Clinton, a request was made to establish a national system of marine protected areas (MPAs), which led to Executive Order 13158 on Marine Protected Areas. In 2004, MCBI co-founded the Deep Sea Conservation Coalition and released the Scientists' Statement on Protecting the World's Deep Sea Coral and Sponge Ecosystems, signed by 1,136 scientists from 69 countries. (The statement was later reopened to signing, and the number of signers increased to 1,452 in 2006.)

In 2005, Elliott Norse was the lead editor and co-author of Marine Conservation Biology: The Science of Maintaining the Sea's Biodiversity, the first textbook focused on the science of marine conservation, published by Island Press.

A consistent theme of the organization was the threat of deep-sea bottom trawling fisheries to coral habitats and other sensitive sea floors. In 2007 MCBI led a joint statement at the American Association for the Advancement of Science meeting calling for the abolition of subsidies that permit deep-sea trawling, which built on the previous scientists' statement.

In January 2009, MCBI was praised for its work in the designation of three large marine national monument in the U.S. territories of the Pacific Ocean by President George W. Bush. In "Green Bush: The departing president tries to burnish his environmental halo," The Economist wrote, "much of the scientific donkey-work and lobbying behind Mr Bush's reserves was done by ... the Marine Conservation Biology Institute, in Washington. Congratulations."

In 2011, MCBI shortened its name to Marine Conservation Institute. A paper in Marine Policy expanded on the organization's long-term emphasis on threats posed by bottom trawling, generated substantial media attention. In the Washington Post, the paper generated the headline "Scientists call for end to deep-sea fishing," citing the evidence of extensive damage to bottom habitats.

In 2012 Dr. Norse resigned as President, becoming Chief Scientist, and Dr. Lance E. Morgan took the role of President. On World Oceans Day in June 2012, Marine Conservation Institute announced the launch of the Marine Protection Atlas (MPAtlas), a global searchable database of marine protected area sites funded by the Waitt Foundation, headed by Ted Waitt.

In May 2013, Marine Conservation Institute and Sylvia Earle's organization Mission Blue released "SeaStates.US 2013: How Well Does Your State Protect Your Coastal Waters?" a report on US states and territories and the percentage of the state marine waters that are established as a "no-take" marine reserve, in which no fishing, energy extraction, or other uses are permitted. The report showed that 15 of the 23 US coastal states and territories had zero square kilometers as "no-take" reserves, and that only one state - Hawaii exceeded 20% as no-take reserves. California and the US Virgin Islands were the only other states or territories that exceeded 5%.

In October 2013, Marine Conservation Institute initiated the Global Ocean Refuge System (renamed to Blue Parks), a strategic, science-based way to safeguard marine ecosystems on a global scale. Blue Park recognition is awarded to outstanding marine protected areas that effectively limit damaging human activities and can demonstrate design, management, monitoring and enforcement that leads to biodiversity conservation.

In 2017, the first three Blue Parks were awarded at the International Marine Protected Areas Congress in Chile; Papahānaumokuākea Marine National Monument in the USA, Santuario de Flora y Fauna Malpelo in Colombia, Tubbataha Reefs Natural Park in the Philippines. In February 2023, three marine protected areas (MPAs) won prestigious Blue Park Awards for exceptional marine wildlife conservation at the 5th International Marine Protected Area Congress (IMPAC5) (Pitcairn Islands Marine Protected Area [Pitcairn Islands, UK], Cordillera de Coiba Managed Resources Area [Panama], and Tupinambás Ecological Station & Alcatrazes Archipelago Wildlife Refuge [Brazil]). The growing Blue Parks network now includes 27 protected areas that have met the highest science-based standards for conservation effectiveness. The Blue Parks network now covers a total of 3,502,090 sq. km (2,176,098 sq. mi) of ocean effectively protected in the waters of 23 countries.

Through the Marine Protection Atlas, the Marine Conservation Institute seeks to provide an understanding of global marine protection in terms of the strength and quality of protections afforded to marine life and the stage of implementation of individual protected areas. MPAtlas' primary goal is to identify and track fully and highly protected areas. Based on The MPA Guide Framework as published in Science on September 10, 2021, coauthored by four Marine Conservation Institute staff and other marine scientists and conservation practitioners, MPAtlas now hosts the world's first global database of science-based MPA assessments. These assessments use standardized frameworks that categorize MPAs by their stage of establishment and the strength of their regulations (protection level). These metrics help estimate the expected conservation outcomes of an MPA and identify areas that achieve the greatest conservation benefits - fully and highly protected areas.

== Funding sources ==
Marine Conservation Institute draws funding from private foundations, individual donors, corporations, and government agencies. In 2011, according to its IRS Form 990, the organization had $1,792,140 in revenue.

== Programs ==
Marine Conservation Institute's work falls under three broad themes, Identifying Vulnerable Marine Ecosystems, Advocating for Healthy Oceans, and Protecting Wild Places. In this way, Marine Conservation Institute bridges the gap between marine science and policy – with an aim toward achieving the oceans' biological diversity and sustainable productivity.

Following are the current focus areas of Marine Conservation Institute.

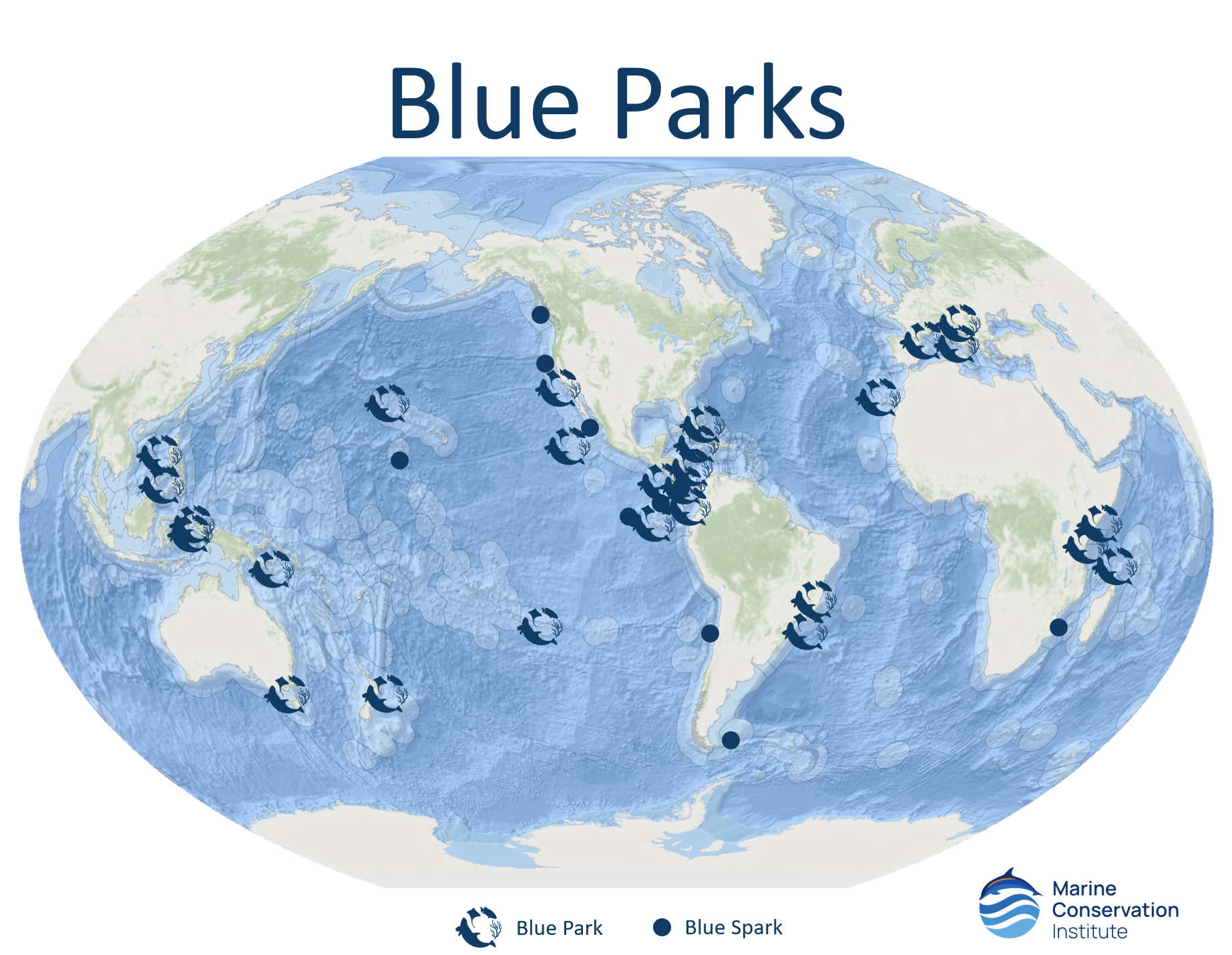
Map of Blue Parks Network as of February 2023

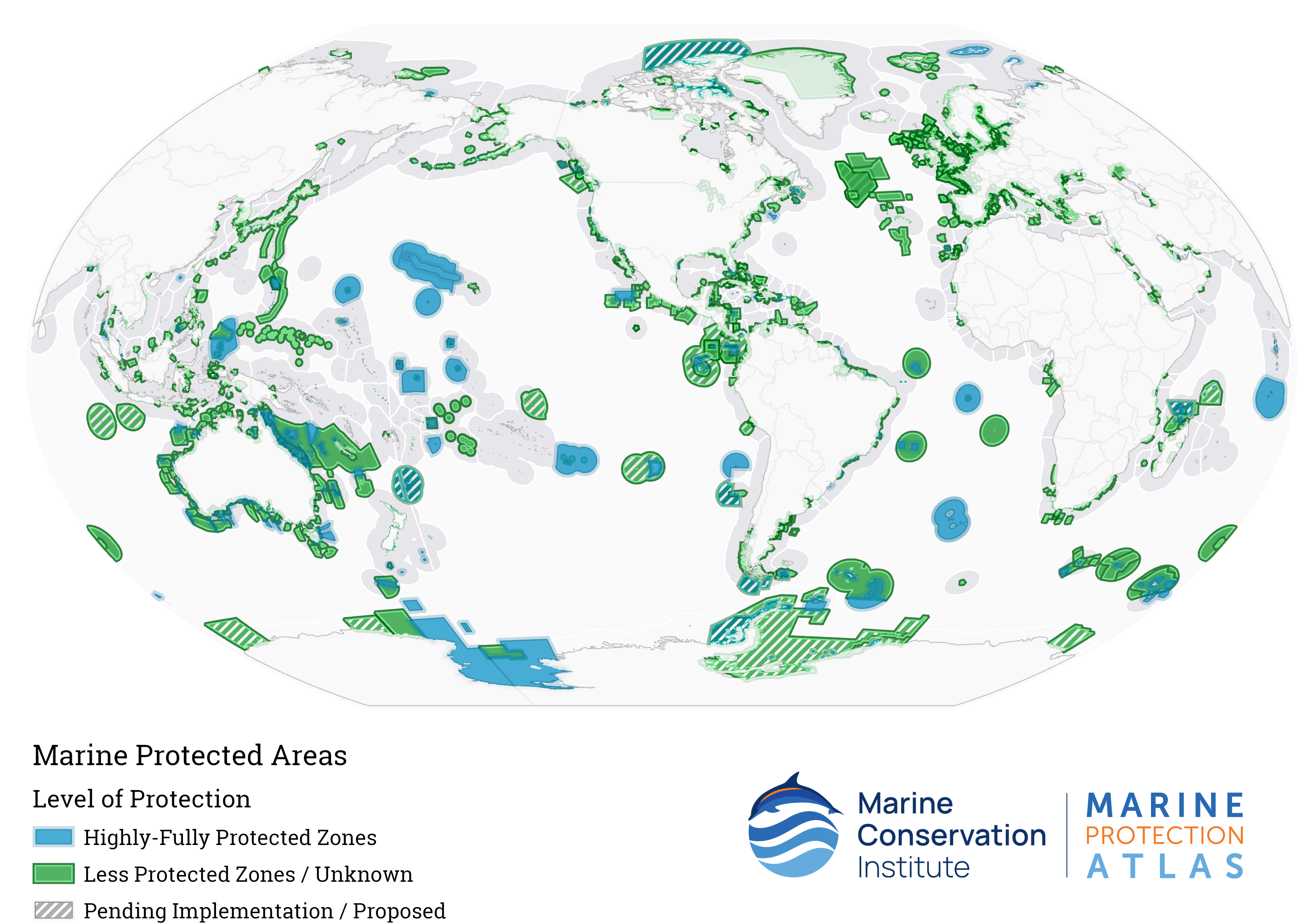
Global marine protected areas as of November 2022

- Blue Parks initiative
- Marine Protected Area (MPA) effectiveness
- Marine Protection Atlas
- Coral Conservation
- Sustainable Fishing
- High Seas Conservation
- Marine Protected Areas (MPAs)
- Ocean Acidification
- Ocean Governance
- Enforcement

== Board of directors ==
- Chair, Nathalie Udo
- Vice Chair, Cariad Louis
- Treasurer, Jeff Smith
- Secretary, Yonel Grant
- Sam Dakin
- David Johns
- Steve Olson, Ph.D.
- Nandita Parker
- Michelle Scobie
- Everett Seymour
- Justin Xavier
- President, Lance E. Morgan, Ph.D.
- Founder, Elliott A. Norse, Ph.D.
- Emeritus, Sylvia Earle, Ph.D.
- Emeritus, James C. Greenwood
- Advisor, Michael Sutton
- Advisor, Gail Osherenko
- Advisor, Diana Parker

== See also ==
- Sustainability
- Marine conservation
