= Deep Space Communications Complex =

Deep Space Communications Complex can refer to:

- The Canberra Deep Space Communications Complex located at Tidbinbilla, Australian Capital Territory near Canberra, Australia
- The Goldstone Deep Space Communications Complex located about 35 miles north of Barstow, California on the Fort Irwin Military Reservation
- The Madrid Deep Space Communication Complex located in Madrid, Spain
- The Indian Deep Space Network located in Byalalu, India
