= Deep Sea Conservation Coalition =

International alliance of groups to protect deep sea environment

The Deep Sea Conservation Coalition (DSCC) is an alliance of over 100 international organizations working to promote the conservation of biodiversity on the high seas. The coalition is calling for a moratorium on destructive deep-sea mining and on the United Nations General Assembly to institute a moratorium on high seas bottom trawling in order to protect seamounts, cold-water corals and vulnerable deep-sea ecosystems.

DSCC members include local, regional, national and international conservation and environmental organizations. Steering Group members include Conservation International, Greenpeace, Marine Conservation Institute, Natural Resources Defense Council, Oceana (non-profit group), Pew Charitable Trusts, and Seas at Risk. Supporters of the coalition include oceanographers, environmental lawyers and conservationists such as Dr. Sylvia Earle, Dr. Callum Roberts, Dr. Elliott Norse, Dr. Alex Rogers, Matthew Gianni, Kelly Rigg (DSCC Coordinator), Karen Sack, Bill Chandler, Arlo Hemphill, Lisa Speer, Charles Fox, Duncan Currie, Dorthea Hangaard, Steven Lutz, Peggy Kalas, Lyn Goldsworthy, and Mirella von Lindenfels. Others who have spoken on behalf of the coalition include Sigourney Weaver, Dr. Jeffrey Sachs, Dr. Ellen Pikitch and Dr. David Suzuki.
