= Blue economy =

Economy based on exploitation and preservation of the marine environment

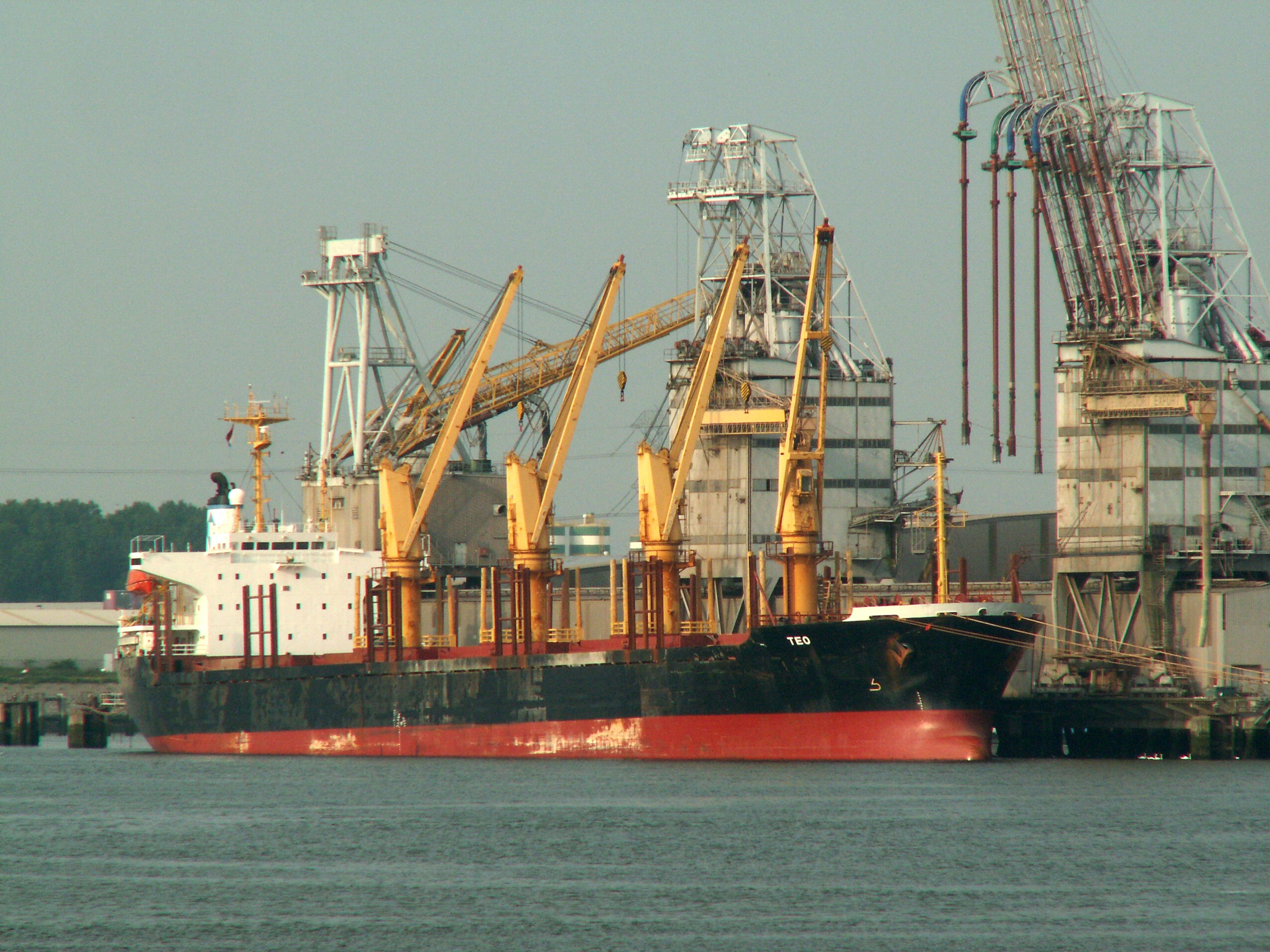
Maritime transport is a part of the blue economy.

In economics, blue economy refers to the economic exploitation of aquatic ecosystems such as oceans, lakes, and rivers, and their coasts. Similarly to green economy, which focuses mostly on land-based activities, blue economy emphasises sustainability in the use of natural resources. Other concepts that refer to partly overlapping areas but usually lack the aspects of sustainability include ocean economy, marine economy, coastal economy, and maritime economy.

The interpretations of what constitutes the blue economy vary among organizations. However, the term is generally used in the scope of international development when describing a sustainable development approach to coastal resources and ocean development. This can include a wide range of economic sectors, from the more conventional fisheries, aquaculture, maritime transport, coastal, marine and maritime tourism, or other traditional uses, to more emergent activities such as coastal renewable energy, marine ecosystem services (i.e. blue carbon), seabed mining.

Similarly to greenwashing, the term bluewashing has been proposed to describe false or misleading claims regarding an action's environmental impact on aquatic environments.

== Definitions ==
There is no universally agreed definition of what comprises the blue economy. The umbrella of blue economy includes a wide range of economic sectors and activities including marine transport, offshore renewable energies, ship building, cruise tourism and fishing. Generally, it has come to refer to sustainable use of ocean resources for economic growth, improved livelihood and jobs, and the health of the ocean ecosystem.

=== By international organisations ===
According to the World Bank, the blue economy is the "sustainable use of ocean resources for economic growth, improved livelihoods, and jobs while preserving the health of ocean ecosystem."

European Commission defines it as "all economic activities related to oceans, seas and coasts. It covers a wide range of interlinked established and emerging sectors."

The Commonwealth of Nations considers it "an emerging concept which encourages better stewardship of our ocean or 'blue' resources."

Conservation International adds that "blue economy also includes economic benefits that may not be marketed, such as carbon storage, coastal protection, cultural values and biodiversity."

According to the United Nations, the blue economy consists of "range of economic sectors and related policies that together determine whether the use of ocean resources is sustainable." They also connect the term to the Sustainable Development Goals (SDG), particularly SDG 14, which focuses on life below water. The term was popularized by the Rio+20 UN Conference on Sustainable Development in 2012.

The Organisation for Economic Co-operation and Development (OECD) uses the term ocean economy to describe any economic activity taking place on, using, or being connected in any way to the ocean.

The World Wildlife Fund proposed defining a sustainable blue economy through a set of principles. These state that the blue economy should:

- provide long-term social and economic benefits for current and future generations,
- restore and protect marine ecosystems,
- rely on clean technologies, renewable energy, and reusing and recycling materials,
- be led by inclusive, accountable, and transparent governance.

== Related concepts ==
=== Blue finance ===
Blue finance refers to financial processes which reduce the carbon footprints of ocean-related economic activities and affect the marine environment positively. It is part of the broader framework of sustainable finance.

According to the World Economic Forum, US$175 billion of annual investment in blue finance would be needed to achieve the Sustainable Development Goal (SDG) most relevant to the blue economy (SDG 14, 'Life Below Water'). However, the current investment is far below what is needed for a sustainable use of oceans, and number 14 is the most underfunded one of the 17 SDGs. Blue finance can also be directed at funding approaches which harness the ocean for climate change mitigation and adaptation. These include developing marine renewable energies (for example offshore wind turbines) and zero-emissions shipping, protecting and restoring coastal ecosystems (including mangrove forests, seagrass meadows).

=== Blue justice ===
Blue Justice is a critical approach examining how coastal communities and small-scale fisheries are affected by blue economy and "blue growth" initiatives undertaken by institutions and governments globally to promote sustainable ocean development. The blue economy is also rooted in the green economy and the UN Sustainable Development Goals. Blue Justice acknowledges the historical rights of small-scale fishing communities to marine and inland resources and coastal space; in some cases, communities have used these resources for thousands of years. Thus, as a concept, it seeks to investigate pressures on small-scale fisheries from other ocean uses promoted in blue economy and blue growth agendas, including industrial fisheries, coastal and marine tourism, aquaculture, and energy production, and how they may compromise the rights and the well-being of small-scale fisheries and their communities.

== Sectors ==
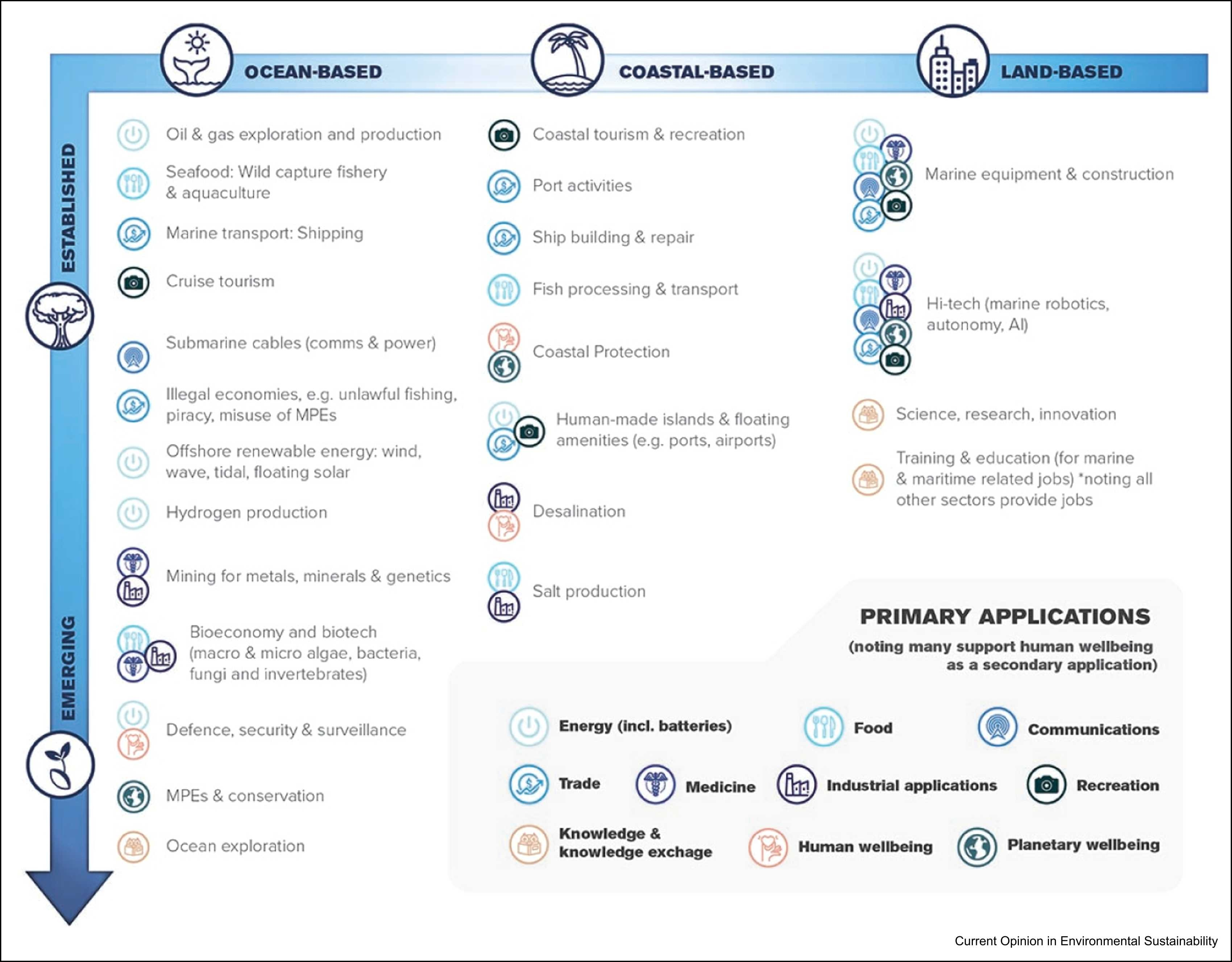
Established and emerging sectors in the blue economy

The blue economy encompasses a wide range of economic sectors. The European Commission has grouped these sectors into 12 categories:

- Blue biotechnology (for example cultured seafood)
- Coastal tourism (cruise and maritime tourism)
- Desalination (converting saltwater to freshwater)
- Infrastructure and robotics (port automation, submarine cables, autonomous ships)
- Marine living resources (aquaculture, fishing industry, fish processing)
- Marine non-living resources (offshore oil and gas industry, deep sea mining)
- Marine renewable energy (offshore wind power, marine energy)
- Maritime defence
- Maritime transport
- Port activities
- Research and innovation
- Shipbuilding and repair

=== Blue biotechnology ===
Blue biotechnology involves using advanced technologies to extract and process biological materials from marine plants and animals and produce commercial goods such as pharmaceuticals, cosmetics, and food. In the European Union, the sector was estimated to account for 2,500 jobs, producing a gross value added of 317 million euros in 2023.

==== Algaculture ====
Algae species, which include macroalgae (seaweeds) and microalgae (single-cell organisms such as spirulina), play a crucial role in aquatic ecosystems. They support underwater life by acting as a food source, producing oxygen, and providing a habitat for animals to live in. Humans use algae for a variety of purposes, including as food, in nutritional supplements, pharmaceutical and biomedical products. Algae as food is also explored as a sustainable protein alternative that could contribute to global food security. Seaweed grows 10 times faster than land plants which makes algae farming (algaculture) an ideal food alternative to traditional agriculture.

From an economic perspective, the algae sector is part of the blue bioeconomy. In member states such as France, Spain and Portugal, which produce the highest amount of algae, farming generated more than 10 million euros in 2022. The EU Algae Initiative set out the goal of producing 8 million tonnes of seaweed yearly by 2030.

=== Coastal and maritime tourism ===
Shark watching, or looking at sharks in their natural habitat, is estimated to generate over US$314 million annually and create over 10,000 jobs globally. Ecotourism, including shark diving, can benefit local communities economically by increasing the number of tourists and duration of visits. Tensions exist between shark ecotourism and shark fisheries as both sectors compete for the same resource, and overfishing makes shark sightings less likely.

== Environmental aspects ==
=== Ecosystems ===
The blue economy harnesses the resources of a number of ecosystems, which are complex interactions of animals and plants in a specific landscape, for example the oceans. The benefits humans derive from these are known as ecosystem services.

==== Mangrove forests ====
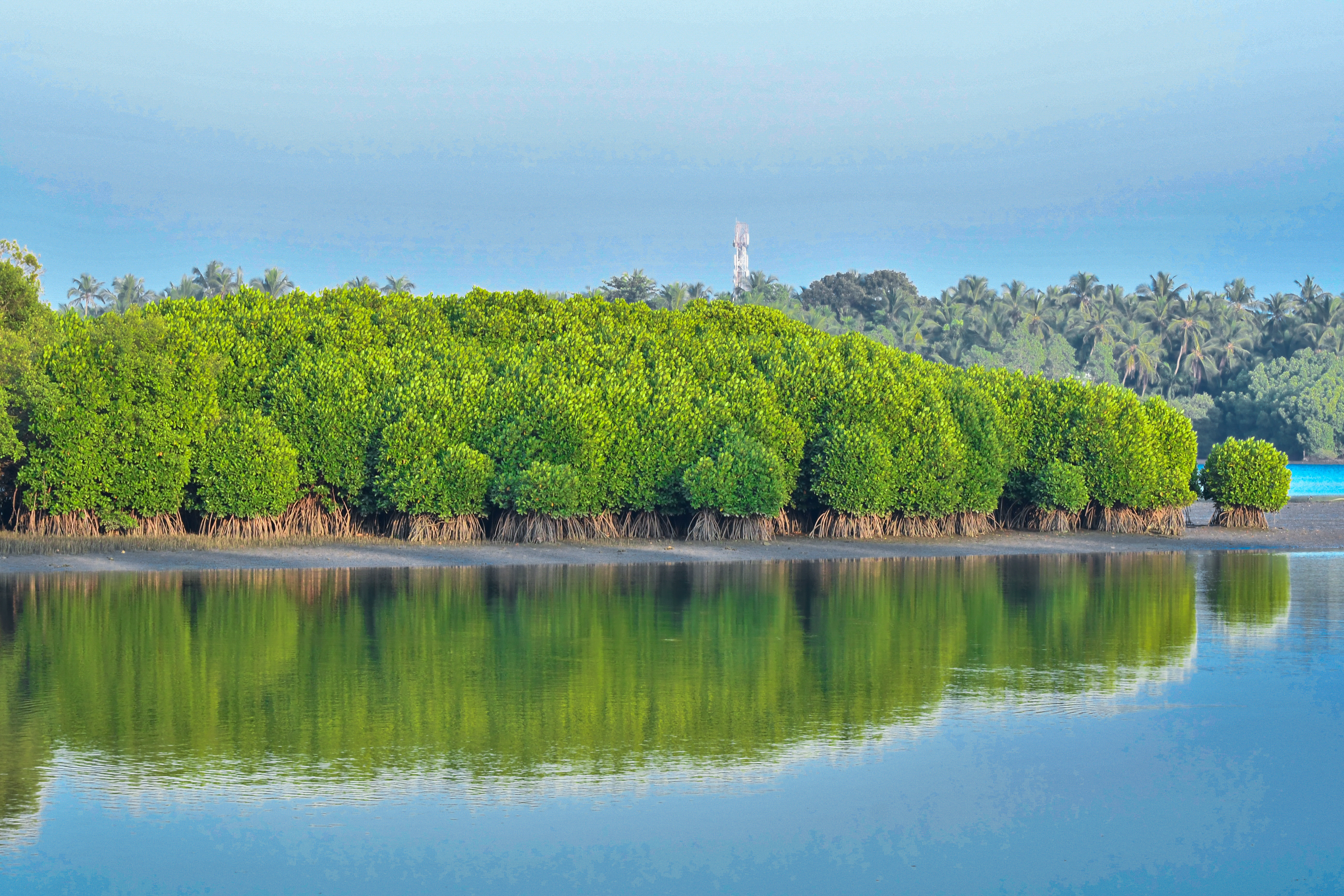
Mangrove forests play an important role in sustainable blue economy.

Mangrove forests are made up of trees and shrubs that grow in coastal areas which are above water level during low tide but are submerged during high tide (known as intertidal zones). Mangrove forests provide a wide range of benefits to coastal communities and the local blue economies. By providing food and shelter, mangroves function as breeding and nursery grounds for fish. In effect, this leads to a higher abundance of fish, crustaceans, and shellfish around these areas which local small-scale fisheries rely on for food and livelihood. With more than 4 million mangrove fishers around the world, mangrove forests are crucial for the food security of multiple countries. Mangrove forests also help mitigate climate change by absorbing carbon from the atmosphere, offer protection from natural hazards such as tsunamis and tropical cyclones, and reduce coastal erosion by strengthening the soil. Despite their beneficial properties, mangrove forests have been shrinking around the world. Since the 2000s, 0.5% of mangrove forests have been lost each year on average.

== Potential ==
Beyond traditional ocean activities such as fisheries, tourism and maritime transport, blue economy entails emerging industries including renewable energy, aquaculture, seabed extractive activities and marine biotechnology and bioprospecting. Blue economy also encompasses ocean ecosystem services that are not captured by the market but provide significant contribution to economic and human activity. They include carbon sequestration, coastal protection, waste disposal, and the existence of biodiversity.

There have been various methodologies proposed on how to estimate the contribution of the blue economy to GDP and the labor market at a regional level.

== Around the world ==
=== China ===
China's concept of blue economy has a domestic focus on maritime industrial development and innovation.

Particularly since 2017, blue economy has been a part of Xi Jinping's diplomacy in the context of the Belt and Road Initiative (BRI) and the Maritime Silk Road.In the context the BRI, China describes its blue economy initatives as:

- Forging a "blue engine" for sustainable development;
- Promoting the sustainable use of marine resources;
- Implementing marine spatial planning;
- Conserving marine biodiversity and resiliance;
- Keeping the ocean healthy and clean;
- Strengthening ocean-based climate action;
- Deepening marine science and technology cooperation;
- Providing maritime public services;
- Improving ocean literacy for all; and
- Building a blue partnership.

China incorporates blue economy concepts into various aid programs, investments, memoranda of understanding, and other cooperation documents as part of the Maritime Silk Road. For example, the Plan of Action to Implement the ASEAN-China Strategic Partnership for Peace and Prosperity seeks to promote a partnership on blue economy between ASEAN and China.

=== European Union ===
In 2023, the EU's blue economy provided jobs for nearly 4.9 million people and contributed to the GDP by €263 billion in gross value added.

=== Philippines ===
As an island country, the Philippines relies heavily on the blue economy. Relevant sectors in the country include fisheries, shipping, renewable energy, and tourism. The blue economy made up nearly 4% of gross domestic product (GDP) of the country in 2024. It is largely financed through foreign aid. However, only 2% of all development aid received by the country is used to fund the blue economy.

=== United States of America ===
The USA uses the term "blue economy" but more frequently describes its view of the concept as "ocean economy." Among the earliest USA documents to use the term "ocean economy" was a commission report in 2004 which discussed environmental sustainability and advocated for the development of a National Oceans Policy.

== See also ==
- Blue carbon
- Sustainable fishery
- Climate change and fisheries
- Blue food
- Green economy
