= Ocean development =

Establishing of human activities at sea and use of the ocean

Ocean development is the establishment of human activities at sea, the use of the ocean, and its governance.

== Politics ==
Ocean development has been a central regulatory issue of the law of the sea. Particularly in regard of marine conservation, ocean development has been critically analyzed as engulfed in colonialist logic, broadening contemporarily regulatory discussion and measures.

The main international bodies of ocean governance are the International Maritime Organization, International Tribunal for the Law of the Sea and International Seabed Authority of the United Nations Convention on the Law of the Sea.

=== India ===
There was a Ministry of Ocean Development in the Government of India, until 2006 when it became part of a larger Ministry of Earth Sciences.

== Outline ==
- Coastal management – Preventing flooding and erosion of shorelines
  - Coastal engineering – Branch of civil engineering
    - Port – Maritime facility where ships may dock to load and discharge passengers and cargo
    - Dock – Human-made structure involved in the handling of boats or ships
- Tsunami warning system – System used to detect and warn the public about impending tsunamis
- Marine weather forecasting – Forecasts of weather conditions at sea
  - Weather ship – Ship used to aid weather forecasting
- Oceanography – Scientific study of the ocean
  - Ocean exploration – Part of oceanography describing the exploration of ocean surfaces
  - Deep-sea exploration – Investigation of ocean conditions beyond the continental shelf
  - Offshore survey – Discipline of hydrographic survey largely concerned with the oil industry
  - Ocean observations – List of currently feasible essential observations for climate research
    - Ocean observatory – List of currently feasible essential observations for climate research
- Underwater diving – Descending below the surface of the water to interact with the environment
- Whale watching – Viewing cetaceans in their habitats
- Marine conservation – Protection and preservation of saltwater ecosystems
  - Human impact on marine life
    - Sea level rise – Rise in sea levels due to climate change
    - Oceanic carbon cycle – Ocean/atmosphere carbon exchange process
    - Marine pollution – Harmful effects to oceans caused by discarded substances or emitted energy
    - Toxic colonialism – Concept in environmental sociology
    - Environmental dumping – Shipment of waste from one country to another
    - Marine debris – Human-created solid waste in the sea or ocean
    - Garbage patch – Gyre of marine debris
    - Plastic pollution – Accumulation of plastic in natural ecosystems
    - Overfishing – Removal of any species of fish from water at a rate that the species cannot replenish
    - Holocene extinction – Ongoing extinction event caused by human activity
    - World Oceans Day – Observance day on or around June 8
- Ocean governance – Policy, actions and affairs regarding the world's oceans
  - Admiralty law – Law of the oceans and their use
  - Maritime migration
  - Seasteading – Concept of creating permanent dwellings at sea
  - Ocean colonization – Type of ocean claim
- Blue economy – Economy based on exploitation and preservation of the marine environment
  - Blue justice
- Deep sea mining – Mineral extraction from the ocean floor
  - Deepwater drilling – Using a drilling rig to bore holes for petroleum extraction in deep sea
- Wild fisheries – Area containing fish that are harvested commercially
  - Dolphin drive hunting – Method of hunting dolphins
  - Whaling – Hunting of whales
- Maritime transport – Transport of people or goods via waterways
  - Sea lane – Regularly used navigable route through a large body of water
- Shipbuilding – Construction of ships and floating vessels
  - Hydrogen-powered ship – Ship fueled by hydrogen
  - Hydrogen tanker – Tank ship designed for transporting liquefied hydrogen
  - Tanker (ship) – Ship designed to transport liquids or gases in bulk
  - Container ship – Ship that carries cargo in intermodal containers
  - Dry dock – Basin drained to allow work on a vessel
  - Hovercraft – Air cushion vehicle
  - Semi-submarine – Boat with underwater windows
  - Semi-submersible naval vessel – Warship that uses water ballast to minimise above-water profile
  - Submersible – Small watercraft able to navigate under water
  - Submarine – Watercraft capable of independent underwater operation
  - Heavy-lift ship – Vessel designed to move very large loads
  - Floating building – Building created to float on water
    - Floating dock (jetty) – Type of dock supported by pontoons
    - Houseboat – Boat used as a home
    - Jackup rig – Type of mobile platform
  - Seabasing – Naval ability to operate at sea without land-based support
    - Icebreaker – Ship that is able to navigate through ice-covered waters
    - Cruise ship – Passenger ship used for pleasure voyages
    - Hospital ship – Ship designated as a medical treatment facility
    - Spy ship – Ship intended to gather intelligence
    - Landing ship – Ship used in amphibious warfare
      - Air-cushioned landing craft – Military hovercraft designed for landing troops and equipment in amphibious operations
      - Amphibious warfare ship – Ship used in amphibious warfare
      - Amphibious assault ship – Type of warship
      - Amphibious assault submarine – Theoretical submarine equivalent of an amphibious assault ship
    - Aviation-capable naval vessel – Ship capable of supporting aircraft activities
    - Aircraft carrier – Warship that serves as a seagoing airbase
      - Submarine aircraft carrier – Submarine equipped with aircraft for observation or attack missions
    - Drillship – Vessel fitted for offshore drilling
    - Crane vessel – Ship with a crane specialized for lifting heavy loads
    - Very large floating structure – Artificial islands used as infrastructure in aquatic environments
      - Floating airport – Infrastructure concept
      - Mobile offshore base – Naval self-propelled moving platform
- Floating island – Island (natural or artificial) made of floating plants, mud, and peat
- Offshore construction – Installation of structures and facilities in a marine environment
  - Mariculture – Marine System (specific Aquaculture – Farming of aquatic organisms)
    - Offshore aquaculture – Fish farms in waters some distance away from the coast
  - Offshore wind power – Wind turbines in marine locations for electricity production
  - Floating solar – Solar panels mounted on a structure that floats
  - Offshore platform – Platform for offshore work, typically petroleum production
    - Fixed platform – Type of offshore platform used for the extraction of petroleum or gas
    - Spar (platform) – Marine structure used for floating oil/gas platforms
    - Tension-leg platform – Type of offshore platform used in production of oil or gas
    - Floating production storage and offloading – Vessel used by offshore oil and gas industry (FPSOs)
    - Oil platform – Offshore ocean structure with oil drilling and related facilities
    - Semi-submersible platform – Marine vessel used in offshore roles with good stability and seakeeping
    - Sea fort – Measures to protect against a military attack by a coastline
    - Accommodation platform – Platform designed to provide living quarters for people
  - Offshore geotechnical engineering – Sub-field of engineering concerned with human-made structures in the sea
    - Offshore drilling – Mechanical process where a wellbore is drilled below the seabed
    - Land reclamation – Creating new land from oceans, seas, riverbeds or lakes
    - Artificial island – Island constructed by people
  - Subsea (technology) – Technology of submerged operations in the sea
    - Submarine pipeline – Pipeline that is laid on the seabed or below it inside a trench
    - Underwater habitat – Human habitable underwater enclosure filled with breathable gas

== See also ==
- Economic development – Process and policies to improve economic well-being
- International development – Concept concerning the level of development on an international scale
- Human development (economics) – Concept in economics
- Law and development – Interdisciplinary study of law and economic and social development
- Sustainable development – Mode of human development
- Space development – Physical presence of human activity in outer space
- Land development – Landscape alteration
