= Ocean colonization =

Type of ocean claim

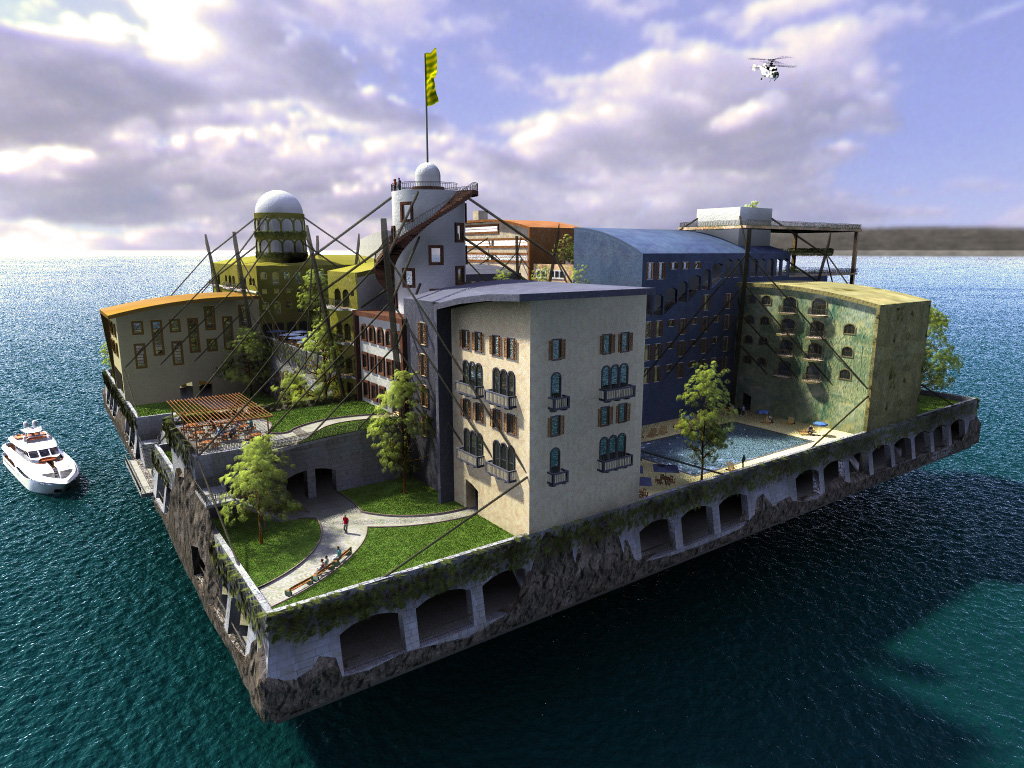
Artist's impression of an imagined settlement in the ocean

Ocean colonization (also blue colonization or ocean grabbing) is the exploitation, settlement or territorial claim of the ocean and the oceanic crust.

Ocean colonization has been identified critically as a form of colonization and colonialism, particularly in the light of growing exploitive and destructive blue economy ocean development, such as deep sea mining, calls for blue justice have been made.

Ocean colonization as ocean settlement, or seasteading, being the extending of human settlement to the ocean, has been identified as settler colonial "tech-colonialism" at sea. Such settlements have been suggested to be established with floating accommodation platforms, such as very large cruise ships or artificial islands, establishing seasteads, or with underwater habitats, employing offshore construction, with arguments for floating structures, as they are generally less impacted by natural disasters. Ocean settlement with the construction of artificial structures in aquatic environments though can also be disruptive to natural marine ecosystems.

Territorial claims are another and continuing international issue, with sovereign states advancing claims through developing and claiming uncontrolled islands, such as in the South China Sea and ocean settlements possibly establishing sovereign states.

Ocean colonization has been advocated for and compared to space colonization, particularly as a proving ground for the latter. In particular, the issue of sovereignty may bear many similarities between ocean and space colonization; adjustments to social life in harsh circumstances would apply similarly to the ocean and to space; and many technologies may have uses in both environments.

== Law ==
The law of the sea internationally negotiated in the latter half of the 20th century states that the ocean is the "common heritage of humanity". From this the need for an international regulation regime has been identified and negotiated for. As the ocean was seen as a technologically optimistic futurist reservoir for economic growth, a model of internationally shared exploitation through a body called the "Enterprise" clashed with private commercial exploitation perspectives.

In addition to this economic dimension, environmental protection considerations have produced calls for rights of nature for the ocean.

== Construction technologies ==
=== Underwater ===
Underwater habitats are examples of underwater structures.

Submerged structures are sunken, air-tight vessels that either sit at an intermediate position or attached to the ocean floor that create an underwater metropolis for residences and businesses.

Ocean Spiral City is a US$26 billion Japanese project, with research and design under way to potentially house 5,000 people; this may be a reality by 2030.

=== Offshore ===
Offshore construction, in which humans live over oceans in locations open to the atmosphere, is an intensive area of focus compared to underwater habitats due to much lower costs and greater safety.

== Land reclamation ==
Land reclamation is the process of relocating rock or placing cement in a sea, ocean or river bed, to extend or create a new area of livable land in the ocean. This process involves creating a solid base on the sea floor and further building upon it with materials such as clay, sand and soil to form a new island-like structure above the water surface. It therefore expands the area for potential development, supporting the erection of buildings or other necessary urban developments in response to support human activities, by utilizing this otherwise untouched space for more "productive" uses. This ocean colonization technique is the most developed in terms of planning and implementation.

=== Examples ===
==== Palm Jumeirah ====
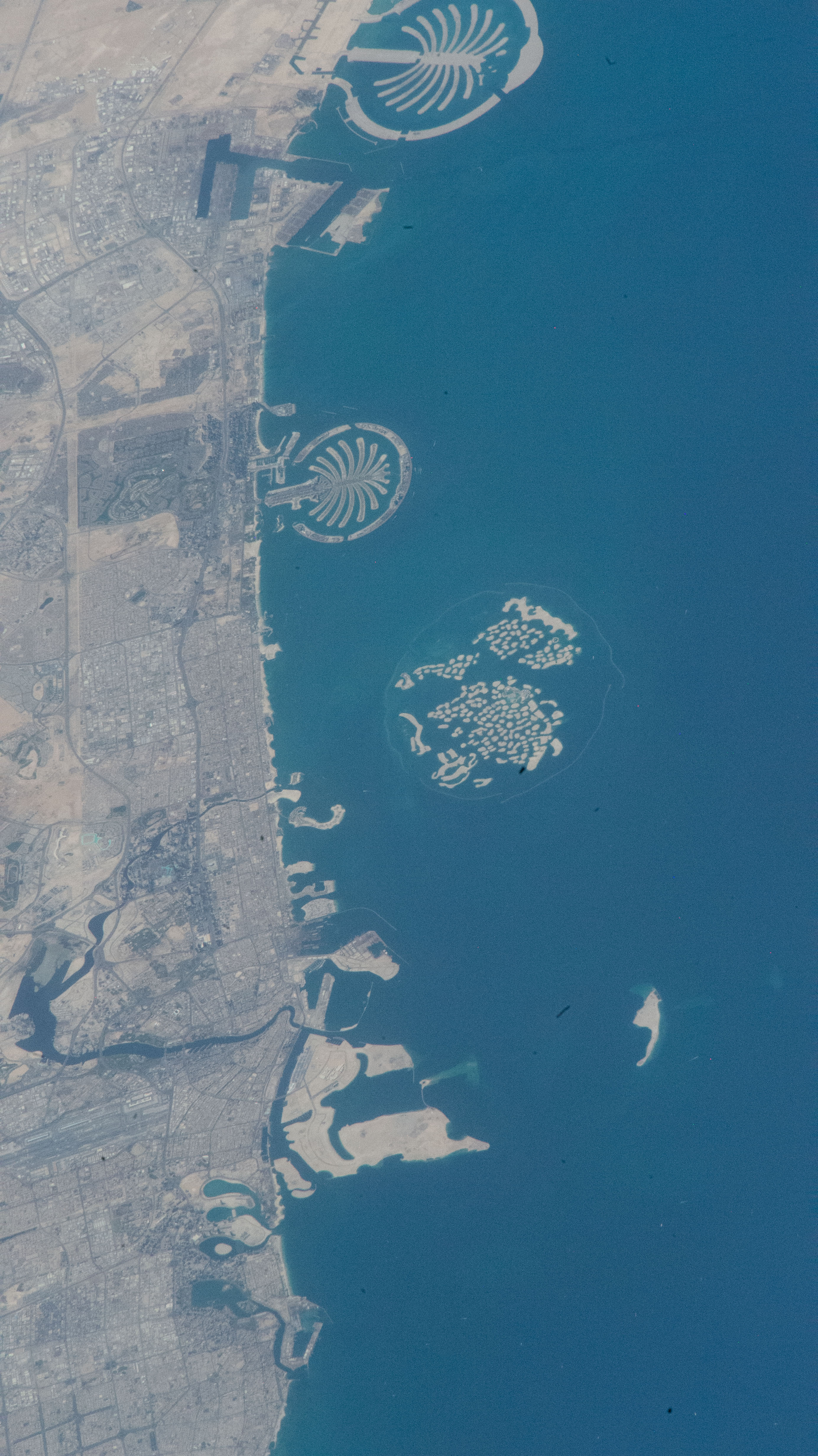
Dubai water front with several artificial islands, including the most developed at the image center Palm Island, Dubai (image taken from the International Space Station)

Palm Jumeirah is the main of three artificial islands in Dubai, United Arab Emirates, to be developed. The name is due to its resemblance to a palm tree when viewed aerially, and is both culturally and symbolically relevant to the coastal city. This land reclamation project began in 2001 and involved the movement of 94 million cubic metres of sand and 5.5 million cubic metres of rock offshore in the Persian Gulf, to allow the development of luxury beachfront villas for both residential and commercial purposes.

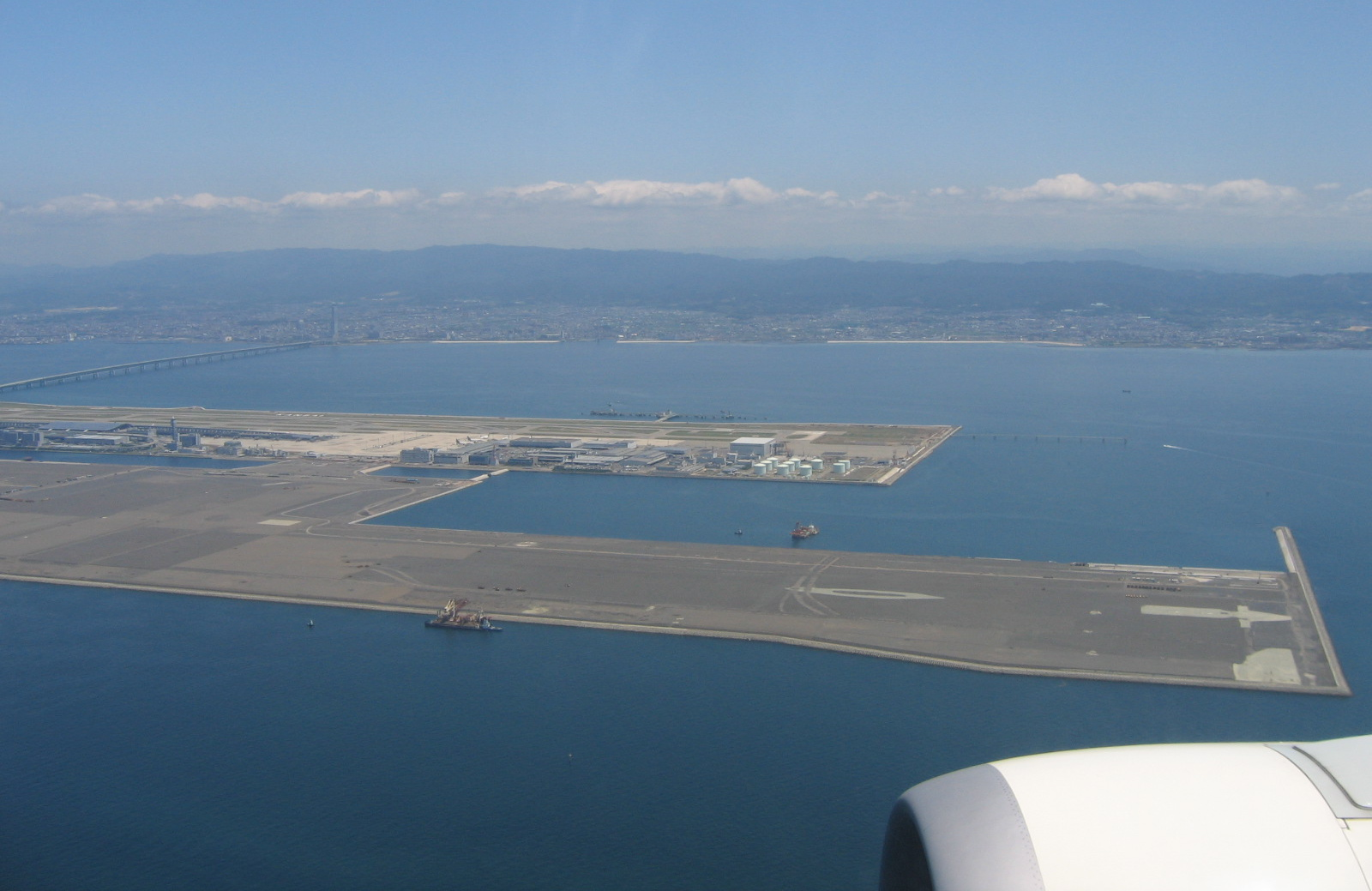
Kansai Airport located off the coast of Osaka Bay

==== Kansai International Airport ====
Kansai International Airport located in Osaka Bay, Japan was created in 1987, due to overcrowding at the nearby Osaka Airport. Developers suggested Japan's mountainous terrain is not conducive to the development of the flat space required for an airport, and thus developed an artificial island in the bay, with a connecting bridge to support both travel and freight arrivals and departures.

==== Portier Cove ====
Portier Cove is an ecodistrict extended off the coast of Monaco and designed to reduce greenhouse gas emissions in the area. The 125 m-long extension project restarted in 2011 and plans to provide a hectare of space for retail, parks, offices, apartments and private villas, to support the nation's growing population.

== Floating structures ==
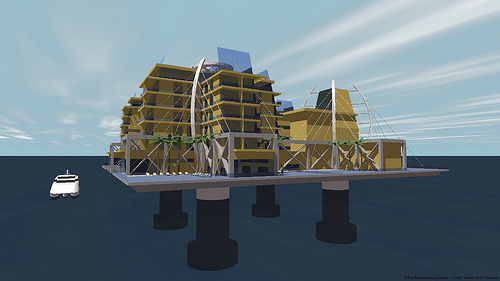
Artist impression of a floating residence

Very large floating structures (VLFS) or seasteads are platforms on pontoons, designed to float on the surface of the ocean or sea to house permanent residents. They have a large surface area and are designed not to be bound to a certain government but rather to form their own communities through clusters of floating structures. This type of technology has only been theorized and is yet to be developed, however, a variety of companies have investment project plans underway.

=== Proposed designs ===
==== Seasteading ====
Seasteading refers to building buoyant, permanent structures built to float on the ocean's surface to support human settlements and colonies.

The idea, developed by Friedman and Gramlich who founded The Seasteading Institute, is now defined in the Oxford English Dictionary. The pair received $500k in funding from PayPal founder Peter Thiel, to begin designing and constructing their idea in 2008.

==== Oceanix City ====
Architecture company BIG proposed a design called Oceanix City, involving a series of inhabitable floating villages clustered together to form an archipelago that could house 10,000 residents. The design was developed in response to the effects of climate change, such as rising sea levels and an increase in hurricanes in Polynesia, that threaten to eradicate many tropical island nations. The design also outlines its intention to incorporate predominantly renewable energy sources such as wind and water.

=== Cruise ships ===
The idea of cruise ships as part of the theory of ocean colonization surpasses the typical modern-day cruise ships. This technology imagines a large-scale vessel, supporting permanent residence on board that can freely move about the world's oceans and seas. These ships would include residential, retail, sport, commercial and entertainment areas on board.

==== Freedom Ship ====
The Freedom Ship concept by US engineer Norman Nixon would be a 4000 ft long vessel with the capability to house 60,000 residents and 15,000 personnel, with an estimated cost of $10 billion.

==== MS The World ====
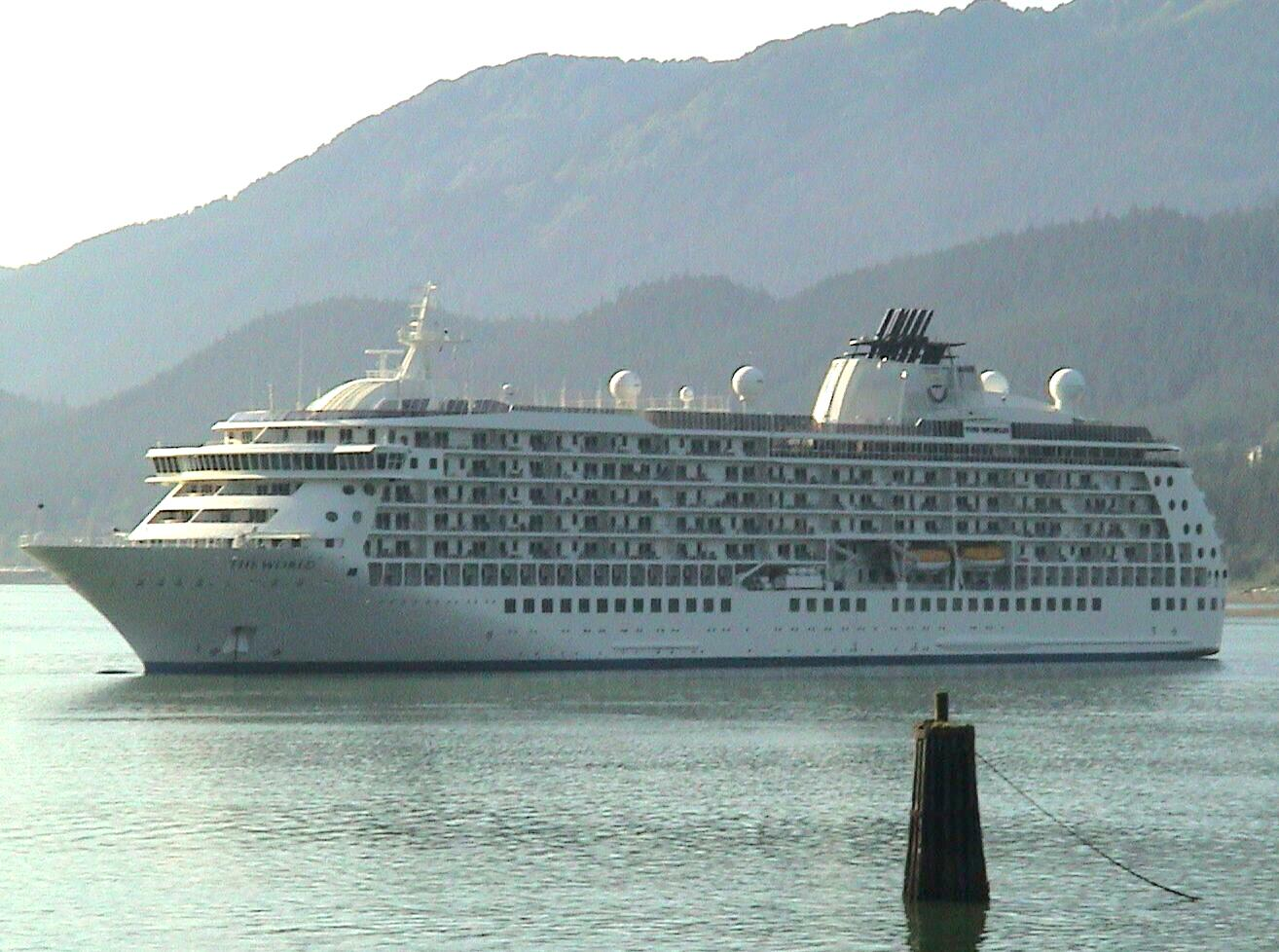
The World is the largest residential floating vessel

MS The World debuted in 2015, sitting at 644 feet (196 m) long, and is presently the largest residential cruise ship in the world. This vessel is the closest existing ship to the Freedom Ship design and hopes to support permanent life on board. Permanent residency on the ship costs between $3 and 15 million per room.

== Ocean robots ==
Ocean robots are unmanned vehicles used in marine science to collect data and conduct exploration.

=== Autonomous underwater vehicles ===
Autonomous underwater vehicles (AUVs) can drift, drive, or glide through the ocean without human control. They often communicate using satellite signals or underwater acoustic beacons, transmitting collected data to scientists in near real-time. Some AUVs are equipped with environmental sensors and can autonomously adjust their missions based on the data they gather.

==== Long-range AUVs ====
Long-range AUVs (LRAUVs) enable rapid-response research in remote ocean regions. For example, a LRAUV developed by WHOI's Scibotics Lab in collaboration with the Monterey Bay Aquarium Research Institute can follow a preprogrammed route within an 1,800-kilometer radius. It can operate under ice at depths of up to 300 meters for weeks, detecting chemical anomalies and capturing images, which it sends back to land via acoustic signals, ocean buoys, and satellites.

==== Gliders ====
Gliders are low-power, winged AUVs that move by altering their buoyancy and glide angle, diving and surfacing in a vertical pattern. As they travel through the water column, gliders collect oceanographic data such as salinity and temperature. Some gliders are also capable of detecting phytoplankton, whales, and sound-producing fish like cod. Designed for long-term missions, gliders can operate for up to six months and periodically surface to transmit data via satellite.

=== Remotely operated vehicles ===
Remotely operated vehicles (ROVs) are controlled by scientists aboard a ship and are connected via long tethers, usually reinforced fiber-optic cables. These vehicles receive power and commands from the surface and send back real-time data and video imagery. Advanced ROVs like Jason are equipped with sonar, imaging systems, lights, and sampling tools such as robotic arms to collect rocks, sediments, and marine organisms. They typically operate for a few hours but can also support multi-day missions.

=== Hybrid ROVs ===
Hybrid ROVs (HROVs) combine the capabilities of AUVs and ROVs. Vehicles like Nereid Under Ice or Mesobot can operate autonomously or remain tethered, offering researchers flexibility in deployment and mission design depending on the environment and scientific needs.

== Possible impact ==
=== Environmental ===
==== Climate change ====
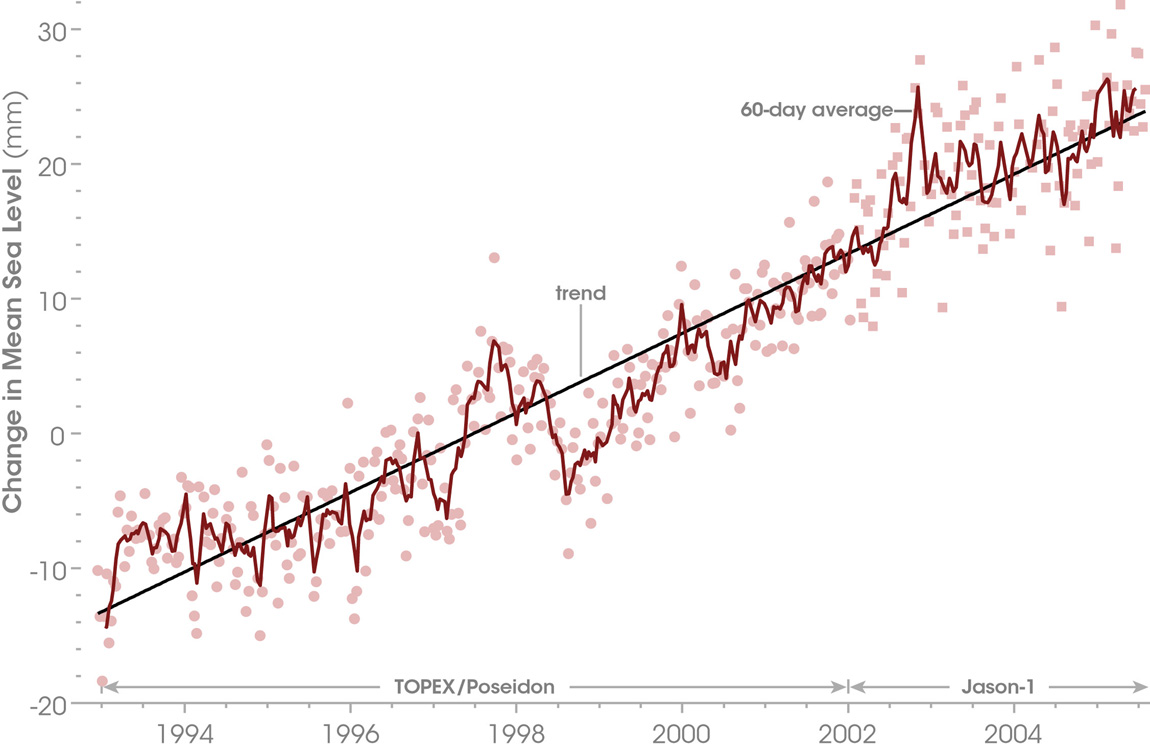
Gradual rise of sea levels since 1992

It is predicted that by 2100, sea levels will have risen by 1–3 metres as a result of global warming, and by 2050 sea level rise is estimated to impact 90% of the world's coastal cities. Theorists who support ocean colonization hope to face the issue and provide a solution for groups and nations worldwide that are most at risk.

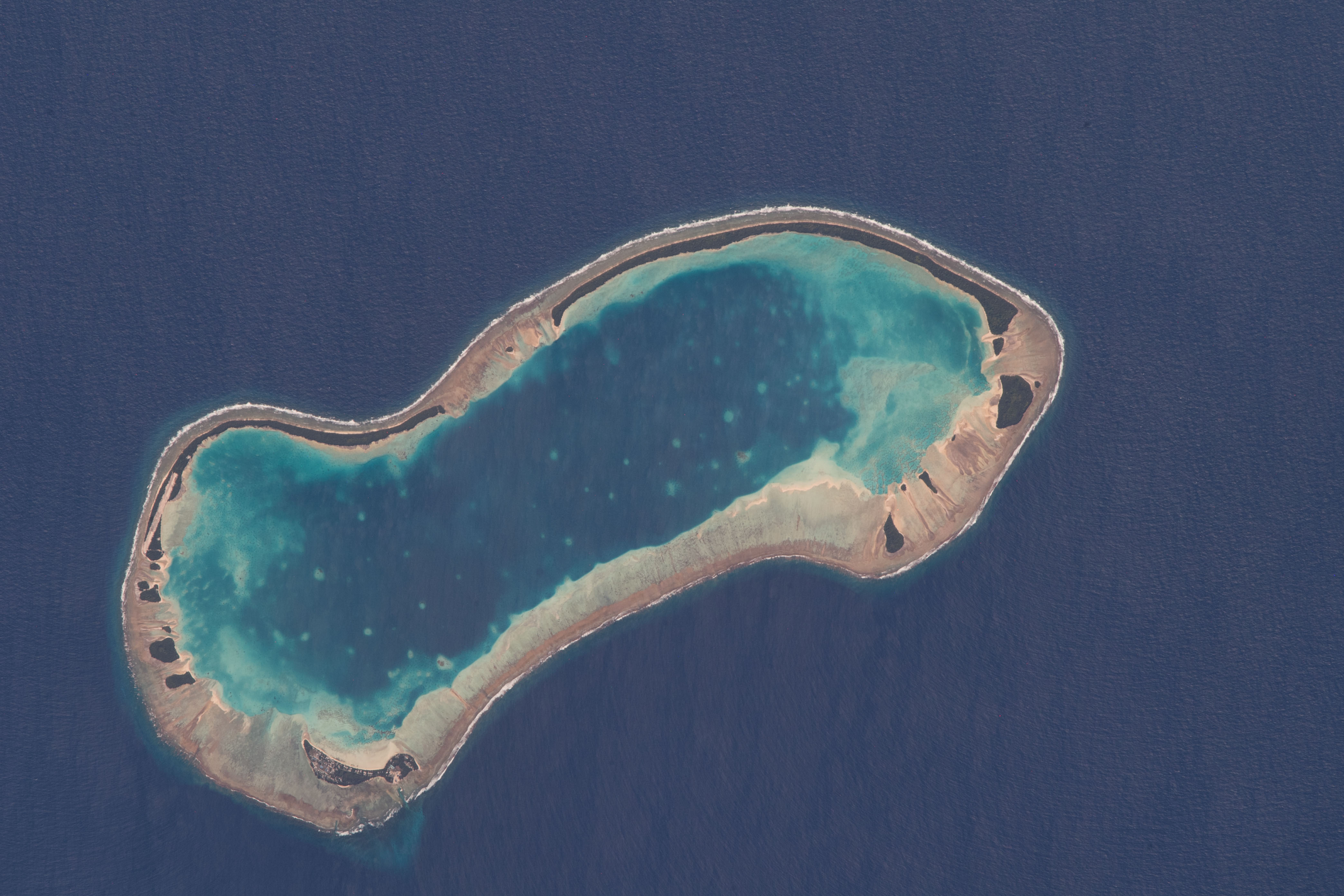
Populated area of Niuoko Islet in Tuvalu

For example, Polynesian island nations such as Tuvalu with a population of 10,000 are expected to be fully submerged by water in approximately 30–50 years.

Entrepreneurs who have devised these technologies to support the colonization of the seas suggest their design will have an overall minimal carbon footprint.

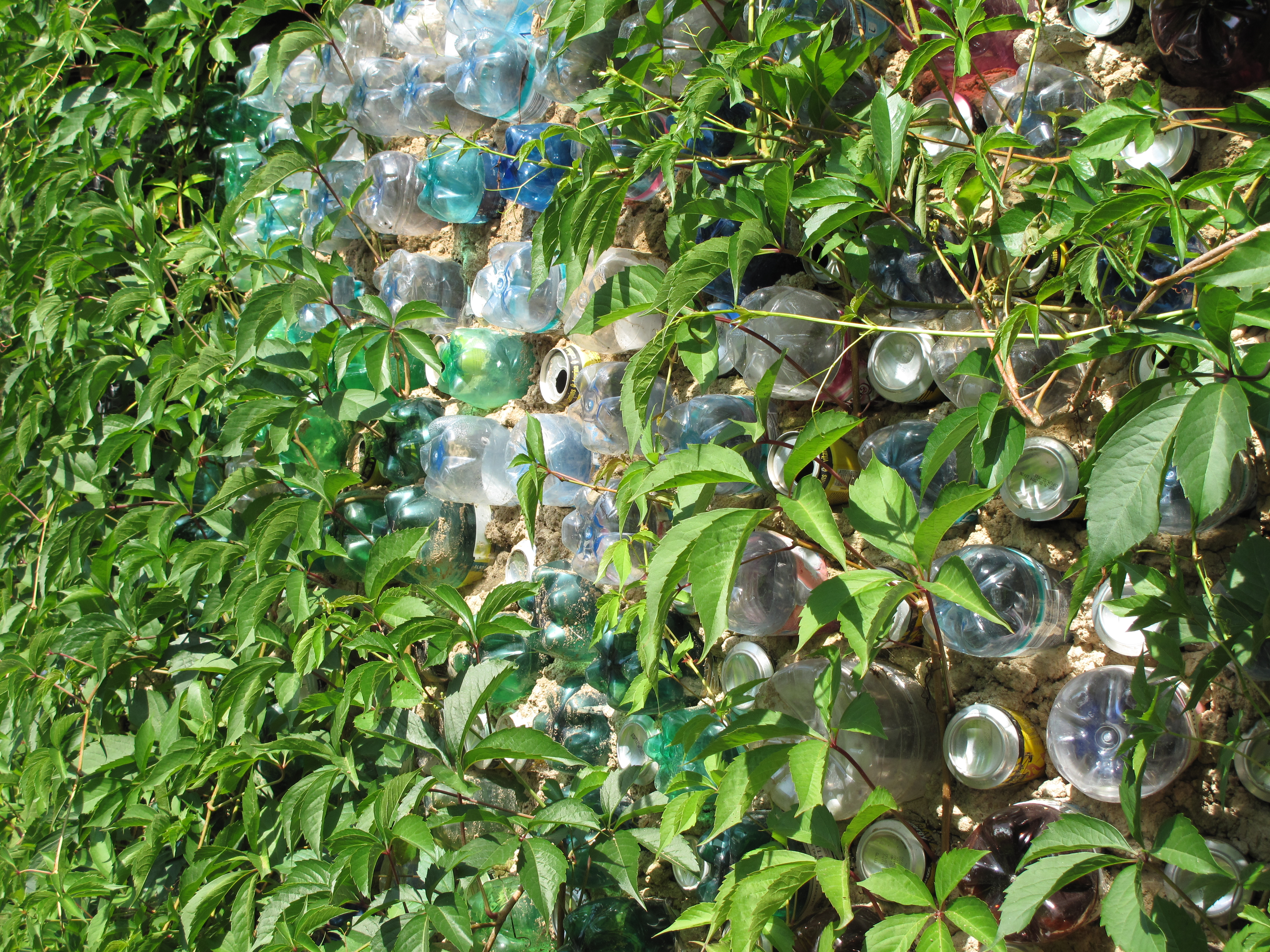
Plastic bottles utilized as building material

Recycled and environmentally-friendly materials such as recycled plastics and locally sourced coconut fibres will constitute a large proportion of building materials required for construction.

To minimize the use of polluting energy sources that contribute to global warming, designers suggest using predominantly renewable energy from sources such as water, wind, and solar power. Designers also intend to utilize bicycles, electric and hydrogen vehicles as the primary transport systems on board to prevent extra CO_{2} emissions. Ultimately, project designers, entrepreneurs, and scientists are aiming to collaborate to create a structure allowing "the formation of an eco-sustainable production and consumption cycle in the future human habitat".

The primary group impacted by the effects of climate change, Pacific island nations, are the target demographic identified for ocean colony projects to which they are still able to remain in their familiar and culturally significant island environment. In 2017, French Polynesia signed an agreement with the Seasteading Institute to utilize their land for testing of the world's first floating town.

Green Float is another example of a project hoping to develop a carbon negative city within the Equatorial Pacific Ocean, with it set to house 100,000 locals by joining multiple floating modules. They hypothesize a 40% reduction in CO_{2} emissions through more environmentally friendly and energy-efficient modes of transport and power

===== Protection from natural disasters =====
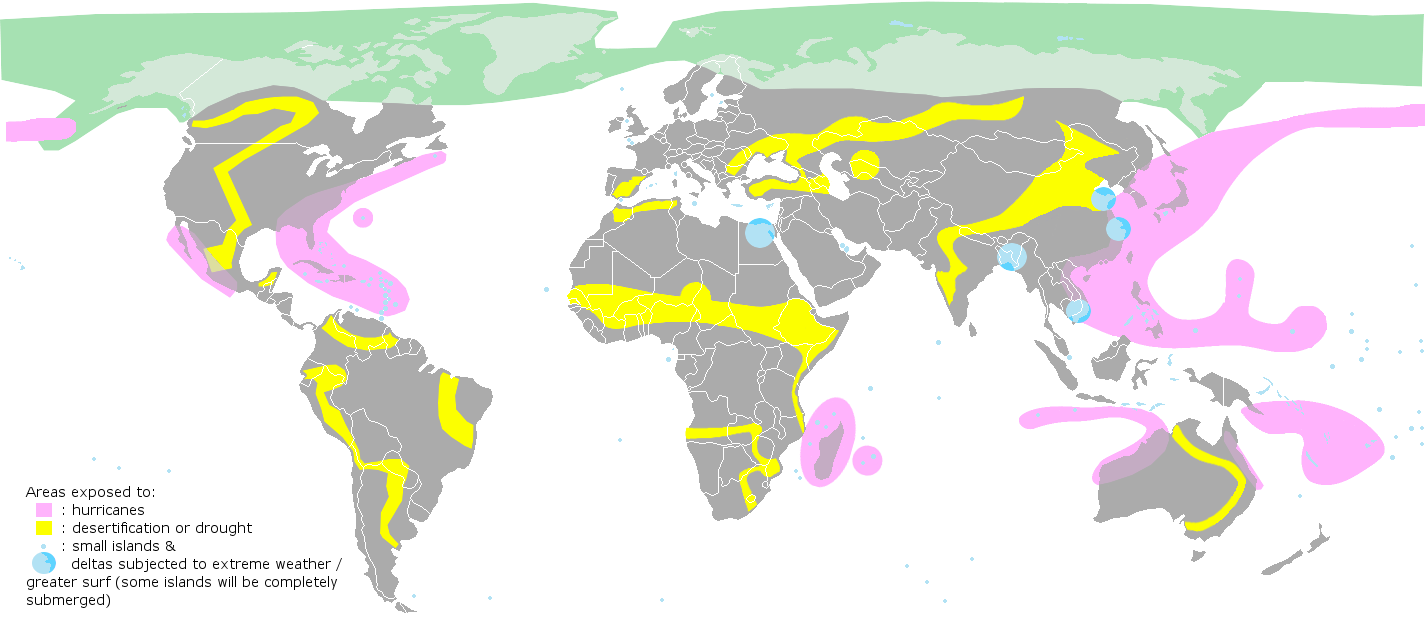
Areas of the world susceptible to natural disasters

The number of natural disasters occurring in the world has grown by 357 from 1919 to 2019, according to Our World in Data, with 90,000 people killed annually as a result of this extreme weather. According to this data, the main economic impacts have primarily come from extreme weather events, wildfires and flooding. Due to these economic effects, cities such as Boston, Miami and San Francisco are exploring the idea of ocean colonization as they try to protect their coastlines from an increase in flooding, rising sea levels and earthquakes respectively. Ocean colony technologies are said to be less impacted by common territorial natural disasters and even extreme aquatic weather such as damaging waves as they occupy more shallow waters. For example, the world's first floating hotel, the Barrier Reef Floating Resort, sat 70 km off the coast of Townsville, Australia and in 1988 withheld against a cyclone.

===== Aquatic natural disasters =====
According to theorists and scientists at the Seasteading Institute who have begun conducting research into aquatic environments as livable spaces, many of the technologies supporting ocean colonization are set to mainly be impacted by rogue waves and storms. However, other aquatic natural disasters such as tsunamis, Friedman says would have little impact on the structures yet only raise water levels.

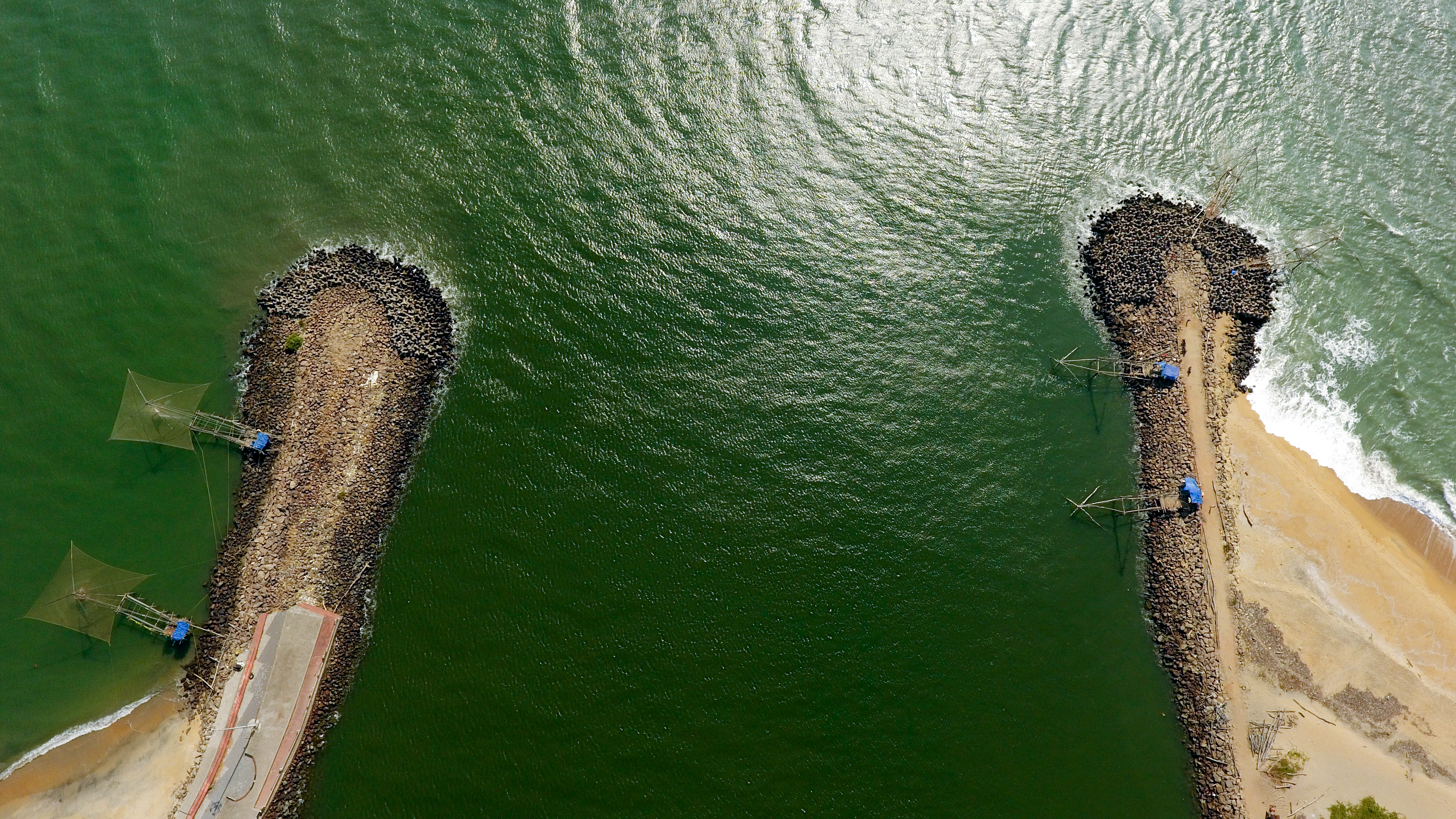
Breakwaters used to minimize wave destruction

Research in the 1990s emerged regarding the hydro-elasticity of rigid structures in the face of relentless and ongoing wave movement which led to modern scientists such as Suzuki (2006), voicing their concern of the potentially poor integrity of aquatic structures impacting by constant motion and vibration. Further modern research and design has also been situated around testing the computation fluid dynamics of resistance against vortex formations of water, such as cyclones that form and therefore threaten ocean environments.

Spar platforms, artificial and natural breakwaters and active repositioning, if applicable, of ocean structures to avoid storms are some suggestions and technologies suggested by ocean colonization supporters and scientists to combat extreme aquatic weather events. Entrepreneurs such as Friedman, have acknowledged and are aware of the care that must be taken in the engineering process of these designs.

===== Disruption to marine ecosystems =====
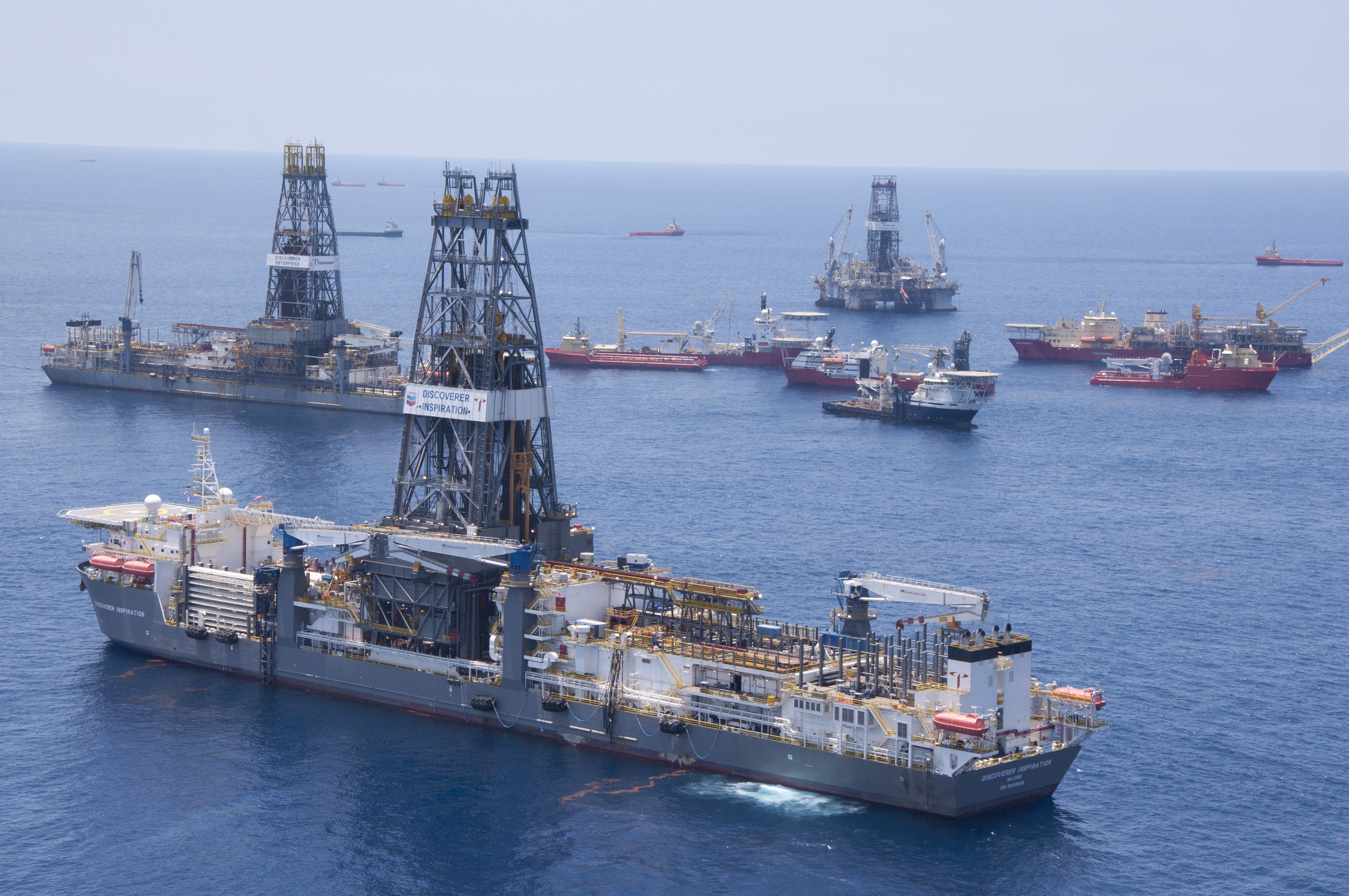
Discoverer Inspiration delivers new containment cap to the Deepwater Horizon oil spill on 10 July 2010. In the background are the Discoverer Enterprise, GSF Development Driller II, and Helix Producer I

Biologists have identified the individualized negative impacts of the technologies that support the implementation of colonization, by their effect on the disruption to the local marine ecosystem.

According to scientists, the process of land reclamation can lead to the erosion of natural soil and land, through this human-made and unnatural movement of sediment that consequently disrupts the natural geological cycle.

Scientists at Marine Insight, have conducted studies of the environmental impacts of commercial cruise ships, with these impacts predicted to be similar to the technologies allowing ocean colonization. Currently, these vessels cause air pollution through the emission of toxic gases that increase ocean acidification.

Their research also showed that noise pollution from these ships can disturb the hearing of marine animals and mammals.

Furthermore, the leaking of chemicals, greywater and blackwater into the ocean can lead to the accumulation of harmful chemicals, increasing the water concentration, that local flora and fauna are accustomed to. These studies of cruise ships and their impact of the marine environment have been incorporated by ocean colonization scientists and designers, as they are the closest, existent technology to their proposed projects.

=== Social ===
==== Overpopulation and housing shortage ====
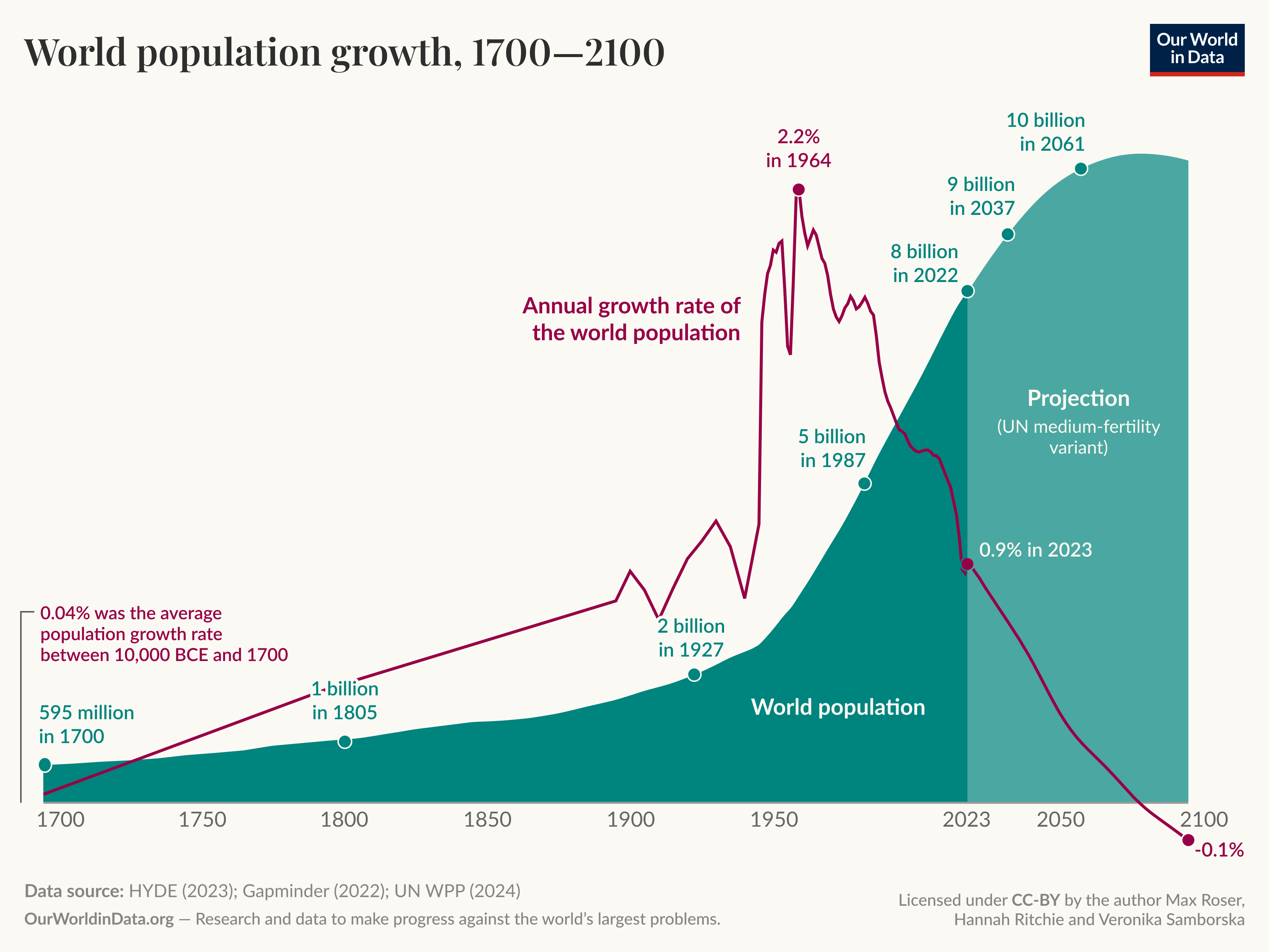
World population growth from 1700 to 2100

Ocean colonization is stated by theorists to be a potential solution to the world's growing population, with 7.78 billion people inhabiting Earth as of May 2020. The BBC claims that 11 billion people is Earth's carrying capacity even after adjusting for consumption behaviours, with the UN predicting this number to be reached by 2100. With the world's oceans covering 70% of the planet's surface, this space has been therefore seen as a viable, long-term solution to allow an expansion and extension of inhabitable space by 50%. Pioneers of this colonization theory suggest the new spaces to also cater for new and more jobs, and may be a particular solution to the moral and political dilemma of housing as well as the consequential increased number of climate refugees.

=== Political-economic ===
==== Sovereignty ====
Entrepreneurs central to this theory have suggested that it has the potential for a degree of autonomy of residences, currently operating in stricter political systems. As a result, ocean colonization has been suggested as a potential solution to poor governance, in which sovereign states may begin the formation of greater personal freedoms, little state regulation, and clearly defined state intentions. Despite critical theorists at the Seasteading Institute suggesting their design to allow people to "experiment with new forms of government", socialists criticise this idea, seeing it as a possible way to bypass tax laws in international waters. Projects such as the Freedom Ship and those by the Seasteading Institute, have proposed the installation of their designs in Polynesian water; however are exempt by a unique governing framework permitting significant autonomy from Polynesian laws.

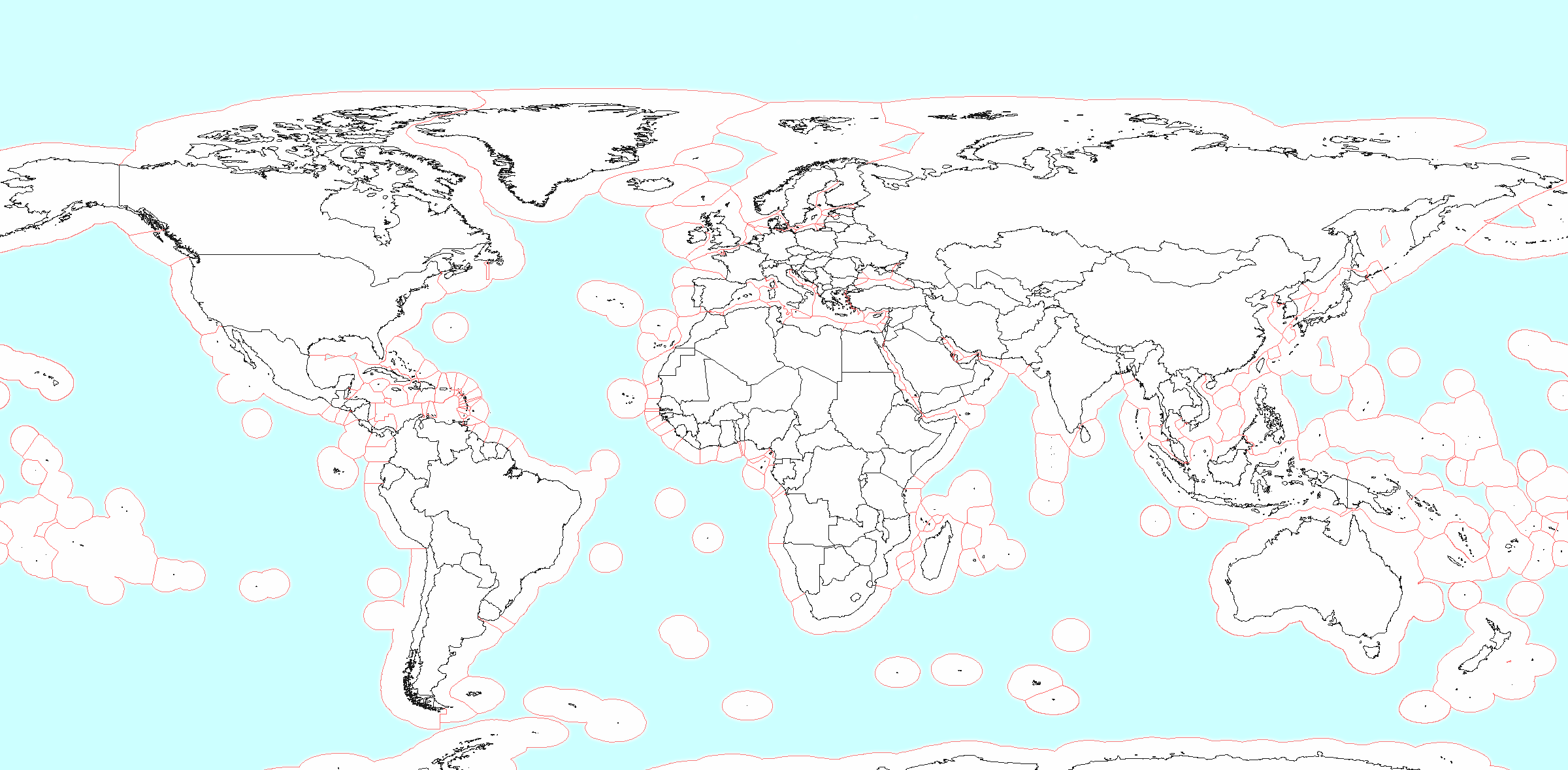
Countries and their exclusive economic zones

Under Article 60 of the United Nations Convention on Law of the Seas (UNCLOS), there is a right to build "artificial islands, installations, and structures" in exclusive economic zones adjacent to coastal nations; however, these coastal nations still hold sovereignty of the 12 nautical mile zone adjacent to their coast.

Little has been vocalized on the development of essential services i.e. schools and hospitals, within ocean colony structures, yet theorists say it is likely that the host or the closest nations will be relied upon until the initial population grows. With intentions to build beyond territorial seas in exclusive economic zones, the likelihood of the idea of pure sovereignty has been questioned by critics.

==== Expense ====
According to entrepreneurs at the Seasteading Institute, their particular technology of floating modules is said to be high, with a predicted cost of $10,000 - $100,000 per 1 acre of seastead, comprised purely by volunteers. Similarly, Friedman, co-founder of the Seasteading Institute, has estimated the entire project to cost a few hundred million. Other projects such as the Ocean Spiral City are set to cost $26 billion.

Critics have responded to these future plans; labeling them as "elitist, impractical and delusional", with "the number of people accommodated limited".

These projects will therefore rely on investors, which is acknowledged by ocean colonization theorists who state the "first people to benefit will be the privileged who can afford to invest in the project". Skeptics criticize the idea, suggesting it is ultimately designed for capitalist gain, rather than a potential solution for future society.

==== Lack of security ====
Without an overseeing government and lack of taxes, critics of ocean colonization suggest there would be little security provided in the open waters, in terms of economics and regarding human rights laws. Theorists are considered threatened of being prey to pirates, with colonies on board therefore having minimal personal protection.

There has been resistance to this seemingly capital-intensive project, as critics of the idea suggest private law cannot be embraced if it challenges that of public laws. Ocean colonization theorists have acknowledged the necessary assignment of responsibility of land and resources into private hands, to ensure that a party is liable. This assigned responsibility is suggested to rely upon existing legal frameworks regarding property, contract, and commercial laws to protect colonies. Ocean colonization theorists are currently working to balance the idea of freedom with security.

== Living adaptations ==
Developing these technologies and strategies will ultimately require changes to daily living.

=== Current progress ===
Land reclamation, followed by seasteading, are the two technologies leading the way in terms of development plans.

In 2017, the Seasteading Institute proposed to begin building the first project village by 2020 in a lagoon in Tahiti. Investor in the project, John Quirk, stated in 2018, that "we could conceivably see our first modest seastead for 300 people by 2022".

In terms of law, in 2019, plans were passed allowing a nation to host the first seastead, to which it must adhere to the regulations of that host country but is also liable for its own tailored special economic zone. Economic freedom is likely to be sought after and granted, but more gradually through a staged approach called "strategic incrementalism".

As of May 2020, both the Seastead Institute and Blue Frontiers have completed their impact assessments and are waiting for updates on their proposal.

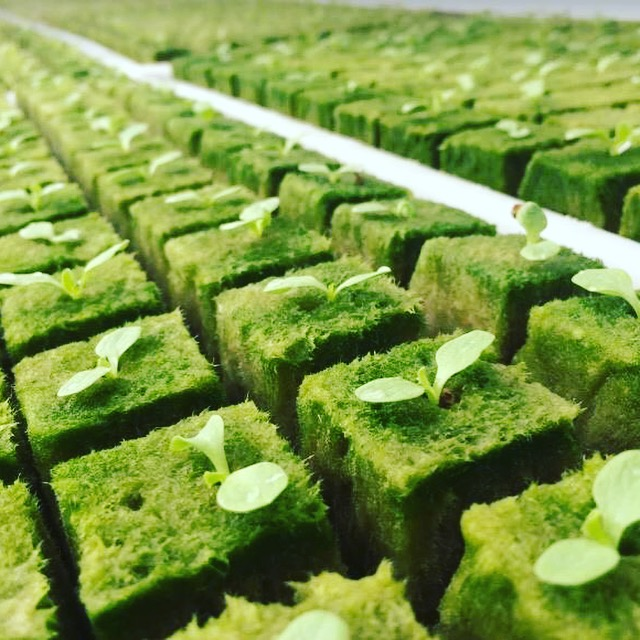
Hydroponic farms

=== Positive ===
Many aspects of living will be relatively unchanged, such as heating, lighting, and cooking. "They would require special consideration and design, however, most technologies would still be available", says Friedman.

With such proximity to water resources, there would be a reliance on hydroponics to account for the limited space on the surface, that would generate energy and support the growth of crops. Similarly, to conserve space, vertical gardens have been suggested by designers for growing and composting.

Humans are more likely to adapt to this environment, as psychologically they are more comfortable with water, with humanity gradually moving to reside to coast and have historically always operated close to waterways.

=== Negative ===
On the other hand, humans are less likely to adapt to this possible solution as the ocean is an unfamiliar territory and they are familiar with their ways on land. Life on the water would also be incredibly different, with limited personal living space and many more shared spaces instead.

There is also the threat of possible overfishing of species near the colony, and the question of waste disposal. With the limited availability of fresh water, critics and theorists suggest that ocean colonies are unable to ever be fully self-sufficient.

== See also ==
- Artificial island
- Colonization
- Colonialism
- Space colonization
- Colonization of Antarctica
- Floating cities and islands in fiction
- Freedom Ship
- List of largest cruise ships
- Ocean development
- Principality of Sealand
- Seasteading
- Terraforming
- Very large floating structure
