= Blue justice =

Blue Justice is a critical approach examining how coastal communities and small-scale fisheries are affected by blue economy and "blue growth" initiatives undertaken by institutions and governments globally to promote sustainable ocean development. The blue economy is also rooted in the green economy and the UN Sustainable Development Goals. Blue Justice acknowledges the historical rights of small-scale fishing communities to marine and inland resources and coastal space; in some cases, communities have used these resources for thousands of years. Thus, as a concept, it seeks to investigate pressures on small-scale fisheries from other ocean uses promoted in blue economy and blue growth agendas, including industrial fisheries, coastal and marine tourism, aquaculture, and energy production, and how they may compromise the rights and the well-being of small-scale fisheries and their communities.

== Definition ==
There is no one definition of Blue Justice. Below are definitions of Blue Justice offered by recent academic literature.

Moeniba Isaacs, PLAAS 2019: Blue Justice has at its core a social justice principle that recognizes the need for small-scale fisheries to have equity, access, participation, and rights within the blue economy. Therefore, the Blue Justice approach for small-scale fisheries, is to "critically examine the political, economic, and ecological processes of blue economy development initiatives."

Svein Jentoft, Life Above Water: Blue Justice for small-scale fisheries in the blue economy agenda means inclusion for small-scale fishers and community members as stakeholders with an eye towards power imbalances and equity. The basic tenets of social justice address who has a stake in the issue, and they focus on what needs to be done to restore justice for past wrongs in the marginalization of small-scale fisheries.

Philippa Cohen et al., Securing a Just Space for Small-Scale Fisheries in the Blue Economy: Securing a "just" space for small-scale fisheries in the blue economy means including human rights and the voices of the largest ocean users in the discussion. It also means that paying closer attention to the social dimensions of fisheries may allow for better governance in this arena.

== Origins ==
To address these longstanding issues, international instruments that explicitly reference human-rights principles have been adopted. The Voluntary Guidelines on the Responsible Governance of Tenure of Land, Fisheries and Forests in the Context of National Food Security and the Voluntary Guidelines for Securing Sustainable Small-Scale Fisheries in the context of Food Security and Poverty Eradication (SSF Guidelines) are instruments that have social justice backings with language that calls for "responsible governance of tenure because land, fisheries and forests are central for the realization of human rights..." (FAO 2012; Governance of Tenure, p. 6), and that "States should ensure that effective fisheries management systems are in place to prevent overexploitation driven by market demand that can threaten the sustainability of fisheries resources, food security, and nutrition." (FAO 2015; SSF Guidelines, p. 11). These instruments are necessary to secure the historical use rights and customary use rights of small-scale fisheries.

Blue Justice has social justice and human rights principles at its foundation, and it has connections to environmental justice and climate justice due to the focus of those movements on the unequal distribution of harm exerted on marginalized communities. Rawls (1999) outlined his ‘justice as fairness’ with two principles: that each person has the equal right to basic liberties, and that social and economic inequalities should be reasonable and attached to positions that are open to all.

Although the environmental justice movement has had difficulty in documenting disproportionate effects on marginalized people, the injustices faced by small-scale fishers and the communities they support have been extensively documented in the past few decades. In the blue economy context, they have faced particular pressures such as the implementation of rights-based fisheries, forms of ocean enclosure such as marine protected areas (MPAs) and marine spatial planning (MSP), which lead fisheries to run the risk of being both forced in and out.

== Blue Justice in the Blue Economy ==
Blue Justice is a social movement in response to the blue economy and blue growth agendas, which "frame the ocean as the new economic frontier" and center on the commodification of ocean resources including "entrepreneurship, technological innovation, multi-use offshore platforms, and new harvesting and cultivation strategies".

It has been argued that if the blue economy is to be sustainable in the truest sense of the word (i.e., be continued forever), then fisheries, and in particular small-scale fisheries, should be the focus. Pauly (2018) argues that small-scale fisheries have features that make them sustainable and less likely to be negatively influenced by global crises. If small-scale fisheries are to be a central focus of the blue economy—which they currently are not—then they will require equitable access to marine resources.

== See also ==
- Environmental justice
