= Subsistence fishing =

Traditional labor-intensive fishing

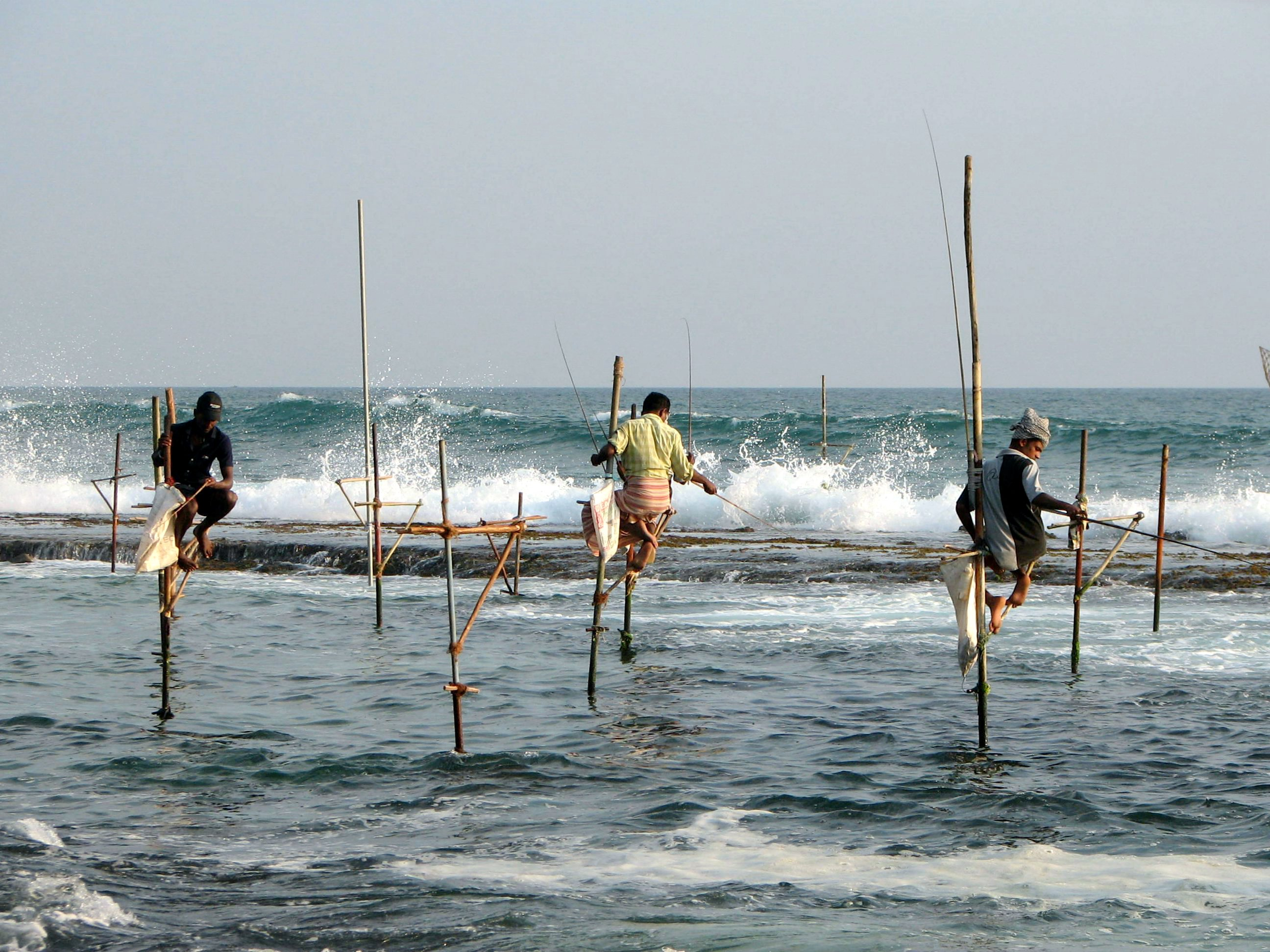
Stilts fishermen, Sri Lanka

Artisanal, subsistence, or traditional fishing consists of various small-scale, low-technology, fishing practices undertaken by individual fishermen (as opposed to commercial fishing). Artisan fishing uses traditional fishing techniques, such as rod and tackle, bow and arrow, harpoons, cast nets, fish traps, and traditional fishing boats.

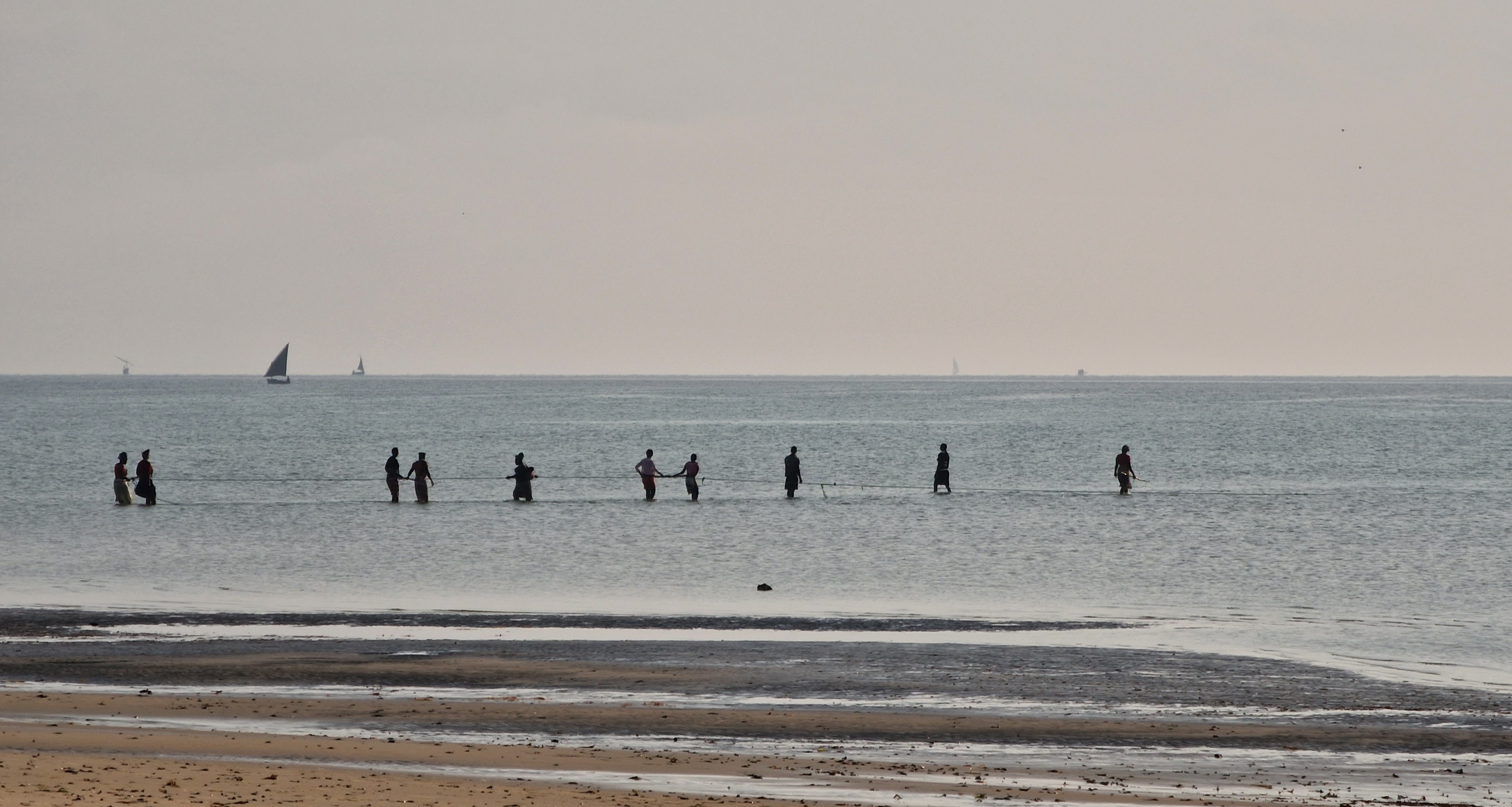
Communal shore seining in Mozambique

Artisan fishing may be undertaken for commercial, cultural and subsistence reasons. It contrasts with large-scale modern commercial fishing practices in that it is often less wasteful and less stressful on fish populations than modern industrial fishing. Target 14.b of Sustainable Development Goal 14 works to provide access rights to artisanal fishers on marine resources and markets.

== Importance ==
Hundreds of millions of people around the world rely on artisanal fisheries to live. Artisanal fishing is critically important for not only food, but for jobs, income, nutrition, food security, sustainable livelihoods, and poverty alleviation as well. Artisanal fisheries are the predominant form of fisheries in "tropical developing countries" such as Nigeria.

The importance of artisanal and small-scale fisheries have been recognized in the first internationally agreed instrument dedicated entirely to small-scale fisheries. This agreement, drafted by the Food and Agriculture Organization of the United Nations is titled the Voluntary Guidelines for Securing Sustainable Small-Scale Fisheries in the Context of Food Security and Poverty Eradication and was implemented in 2015. In addition, there is increased global advocacy to provide access for small-scale artisanal fishers to marine resources and market, this is one of the major targets of the United Nations Sustainable Development Goal 14.

Many subsistence and small-scale fishers, especially in tropical developing countries, depend on the fishing grounds that develop around mangrove forests. Mangroves provide breeding and nursery habitat for the fish, crustaceans and shellfish, which makes these areas a rich fishing resource. More than four million people fish in mangroves worldwide, and these fisheries are an important source of food security and income for coastal communities.

== Artisan fishing boats and gears ==
=== Nigeria ===
A traditional dug out canoe between 3–18 meters long is used in Nigeria for artisanal fishing. Artisanal fishers in this area use gear that included, "cast nets, handlines, basket traps, longlines, set gillnets and beach and purse seines".

=== Sudan ===
Fishing vessels used in Sudan include from the sharoaq, feluka and murkab al hadeed. Equipment varies by region and includes fixed nets, drift nets, seine nets, long line and cast nets.

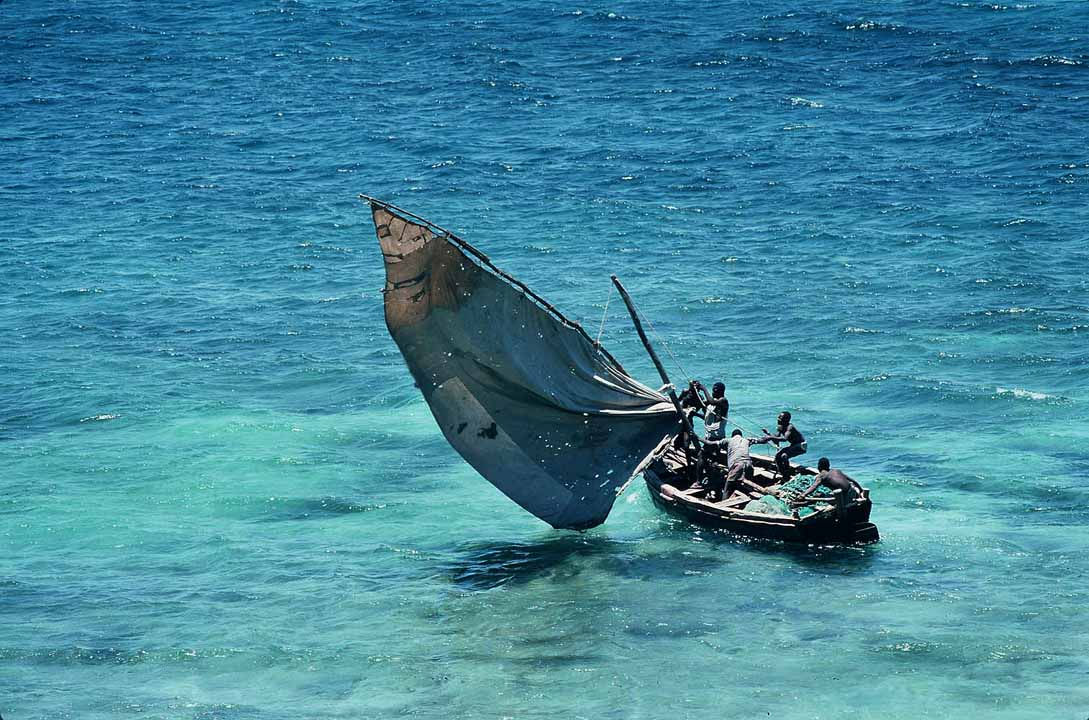
Fishermen at work off the northern coast of Mozambique

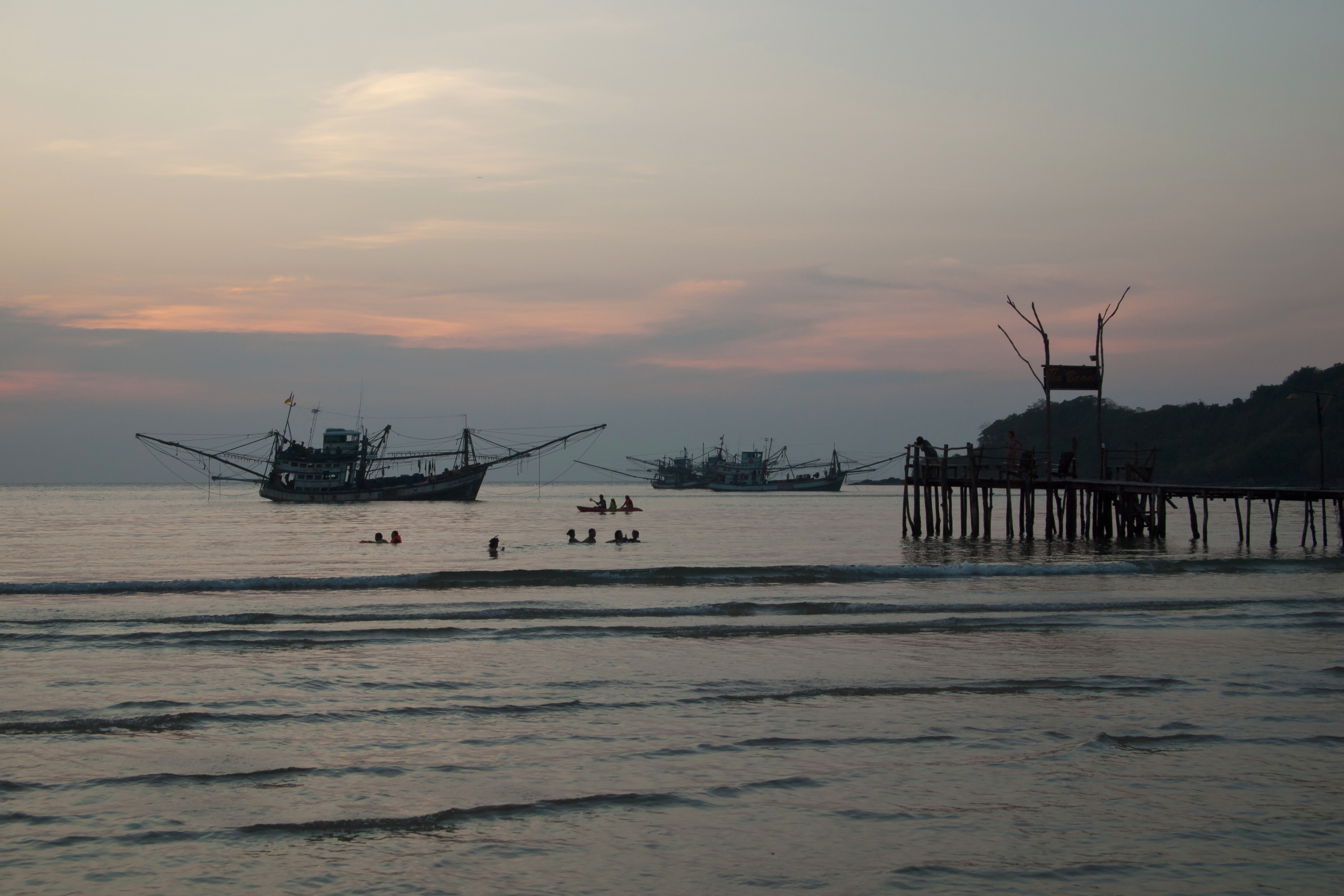
Fishing boats at Ko Kut, Thailand

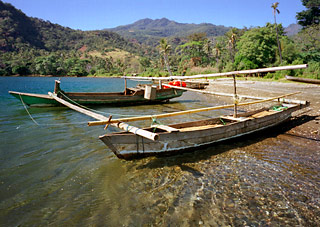
Fishing boats on Flores, Indonesia

== Techniques ==
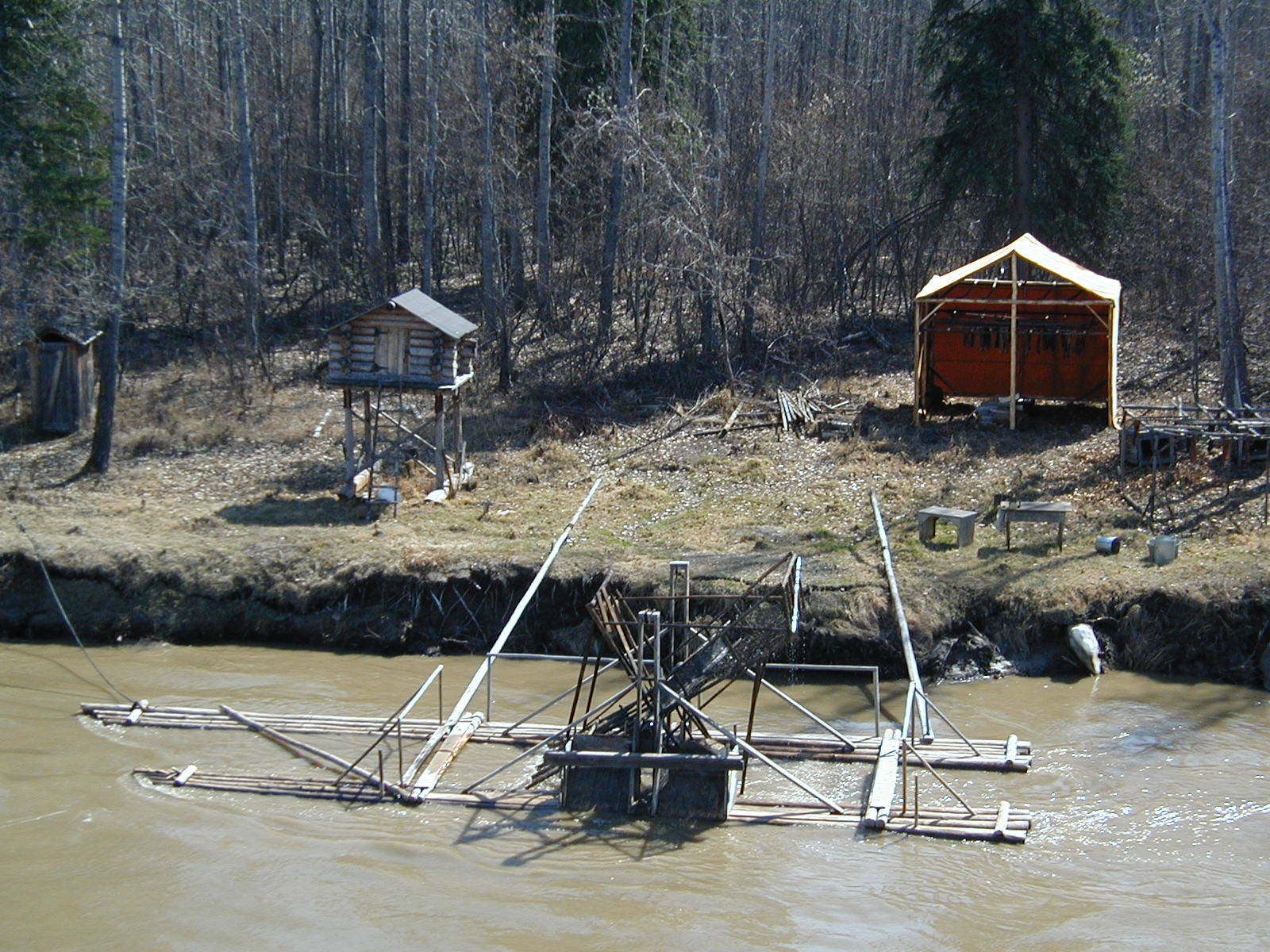
Fish wheel used in Alaska

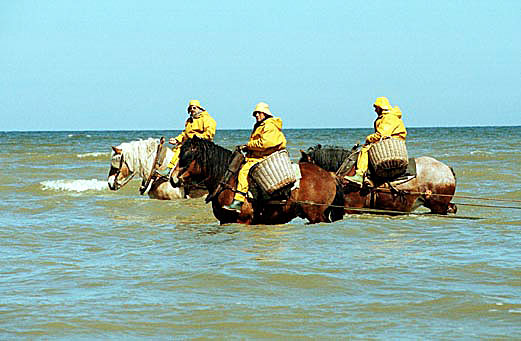
Shrimpers on horseback, Oostduinkerke, Belgium

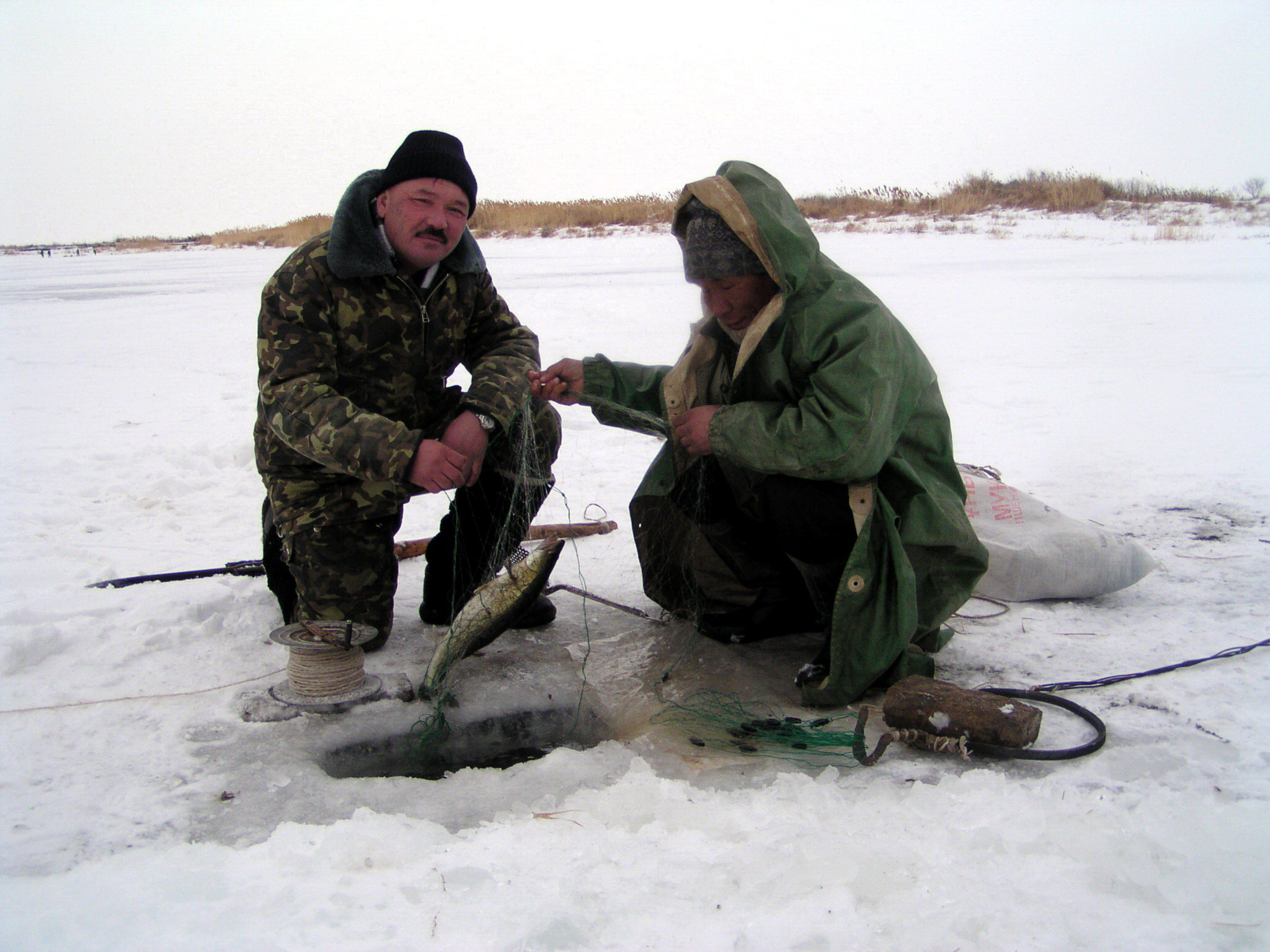
Ice fishing on Syr-Darya river, Qyzylorda, Kazakhstan

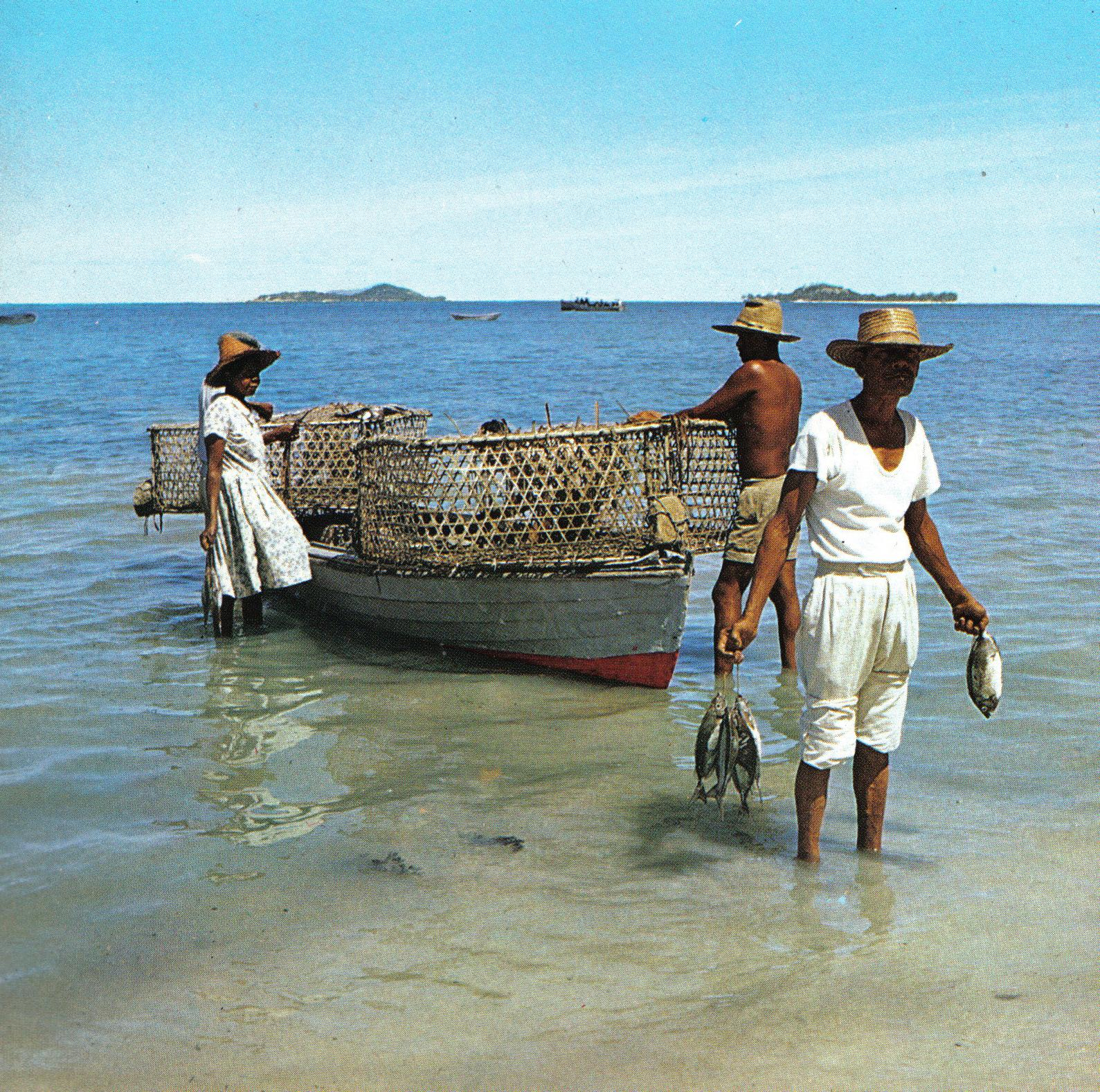
Fisherman landing his catch, Seychelles

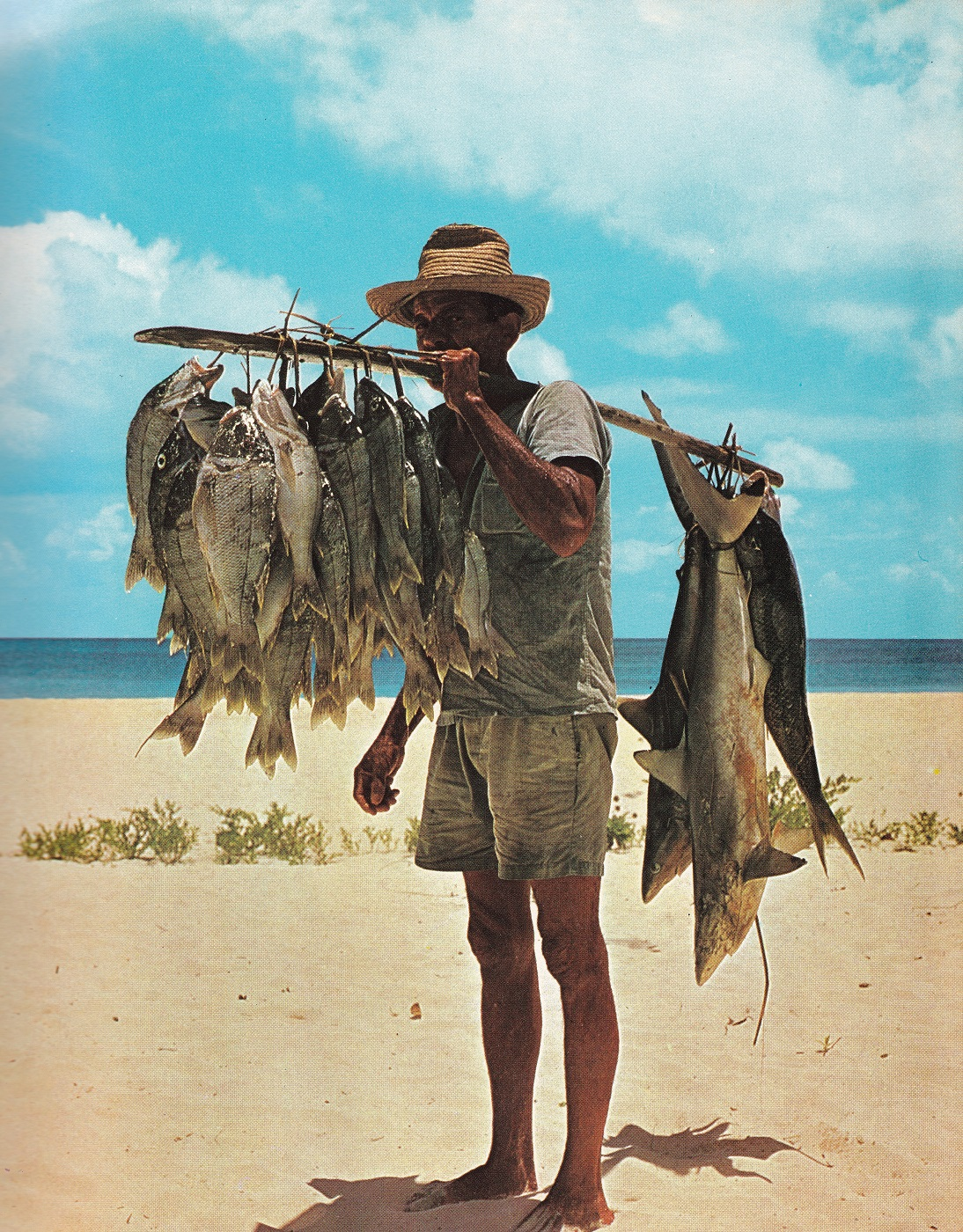
Fisherman and his catch, Seychelles. The fish, including small sharks, were hooked on hand lines many miles off shore.
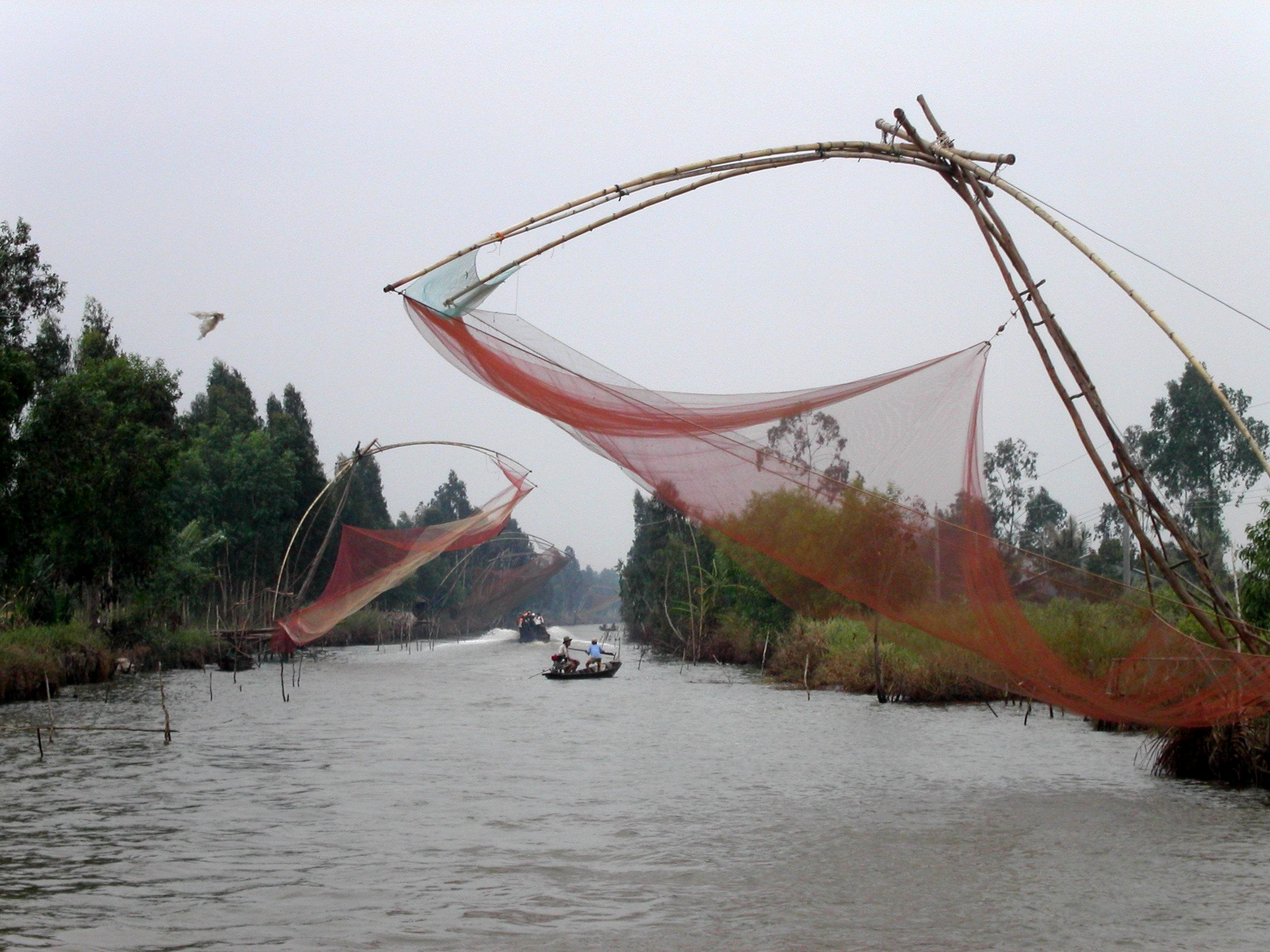
Shore based lift nets in Cà Mau, Vietnam. Also see Chinese fishing nets of Kochi.
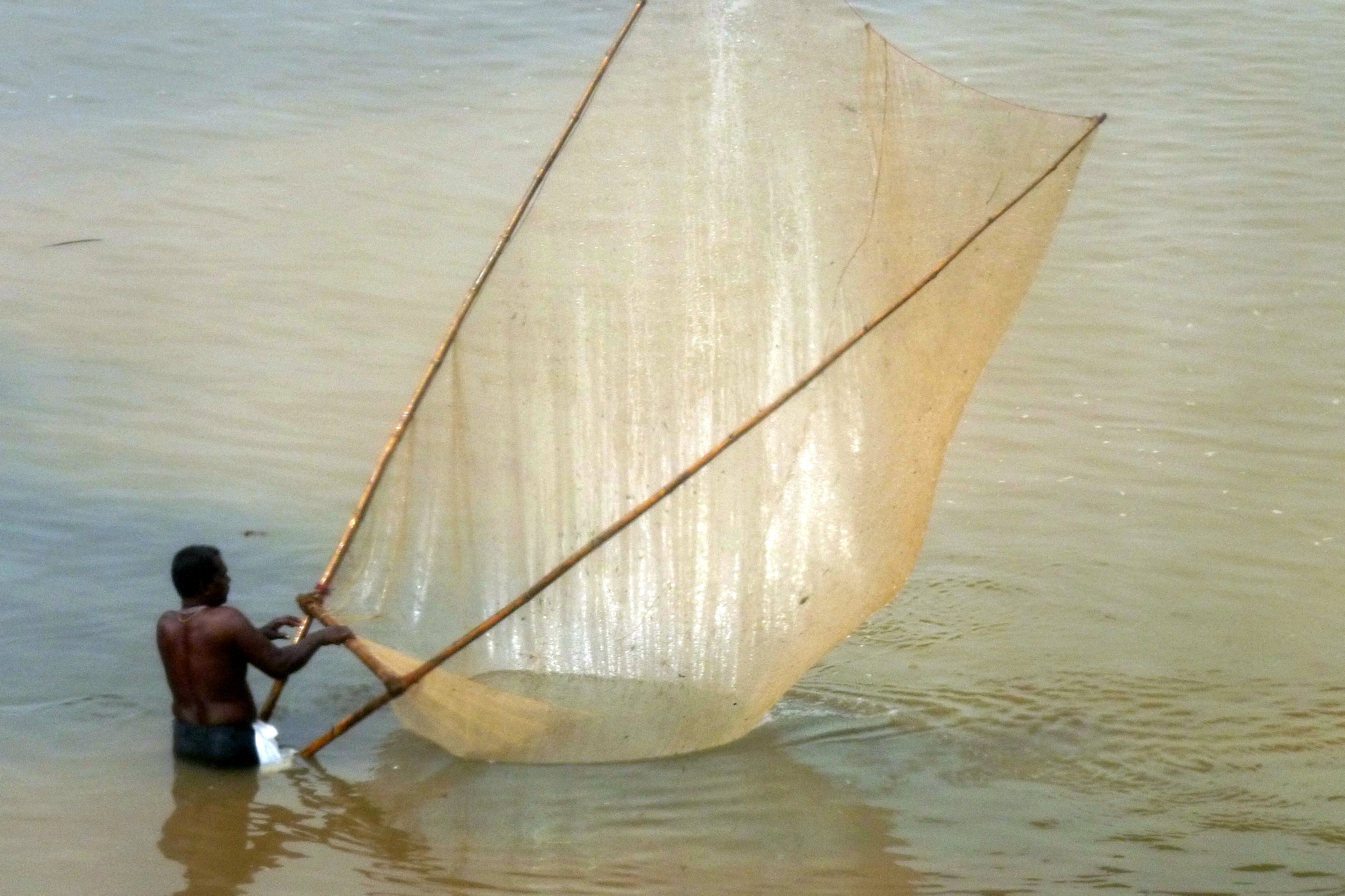
Fisherman with his net

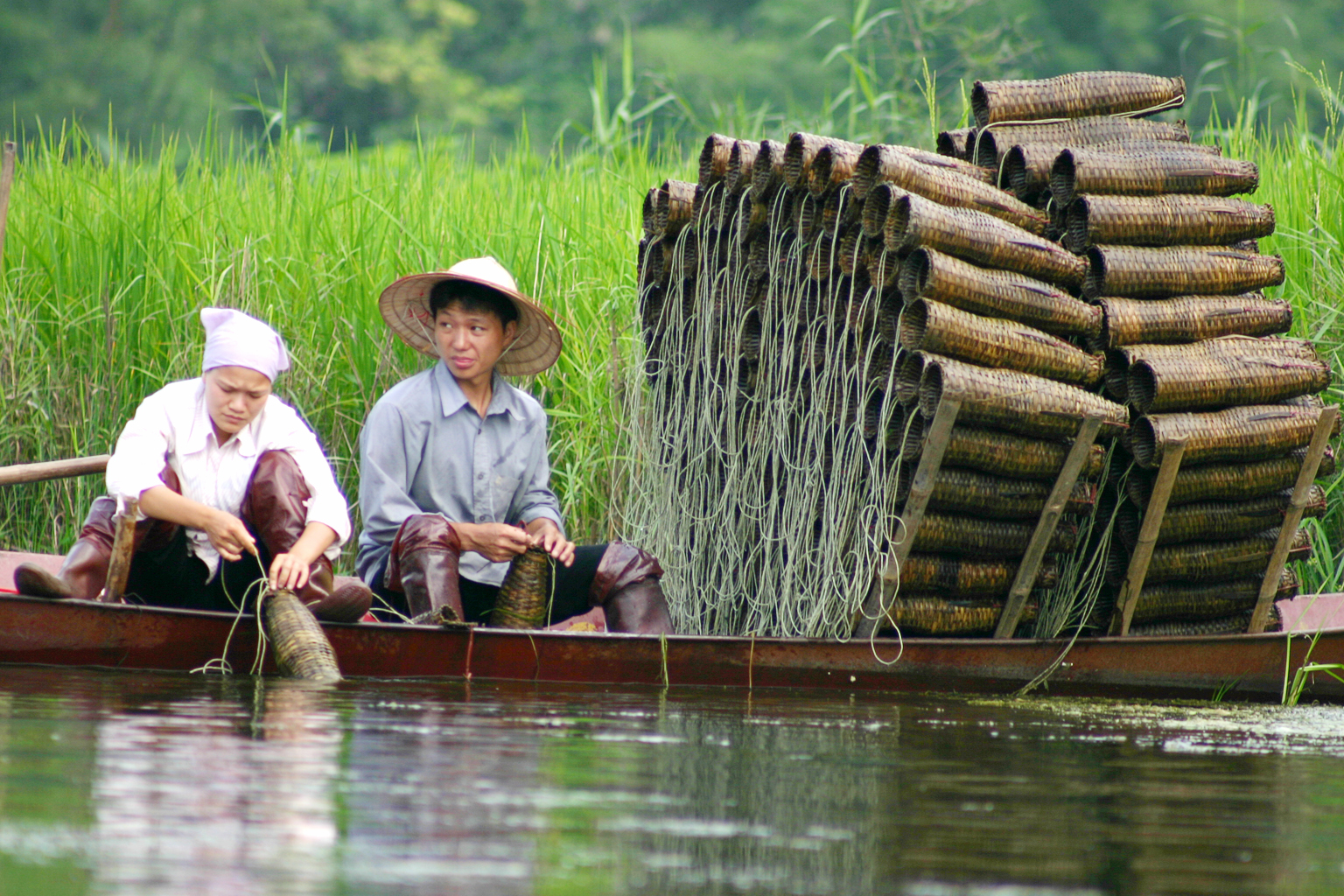
Traditional fish traps, Hà Tây, Vietnam

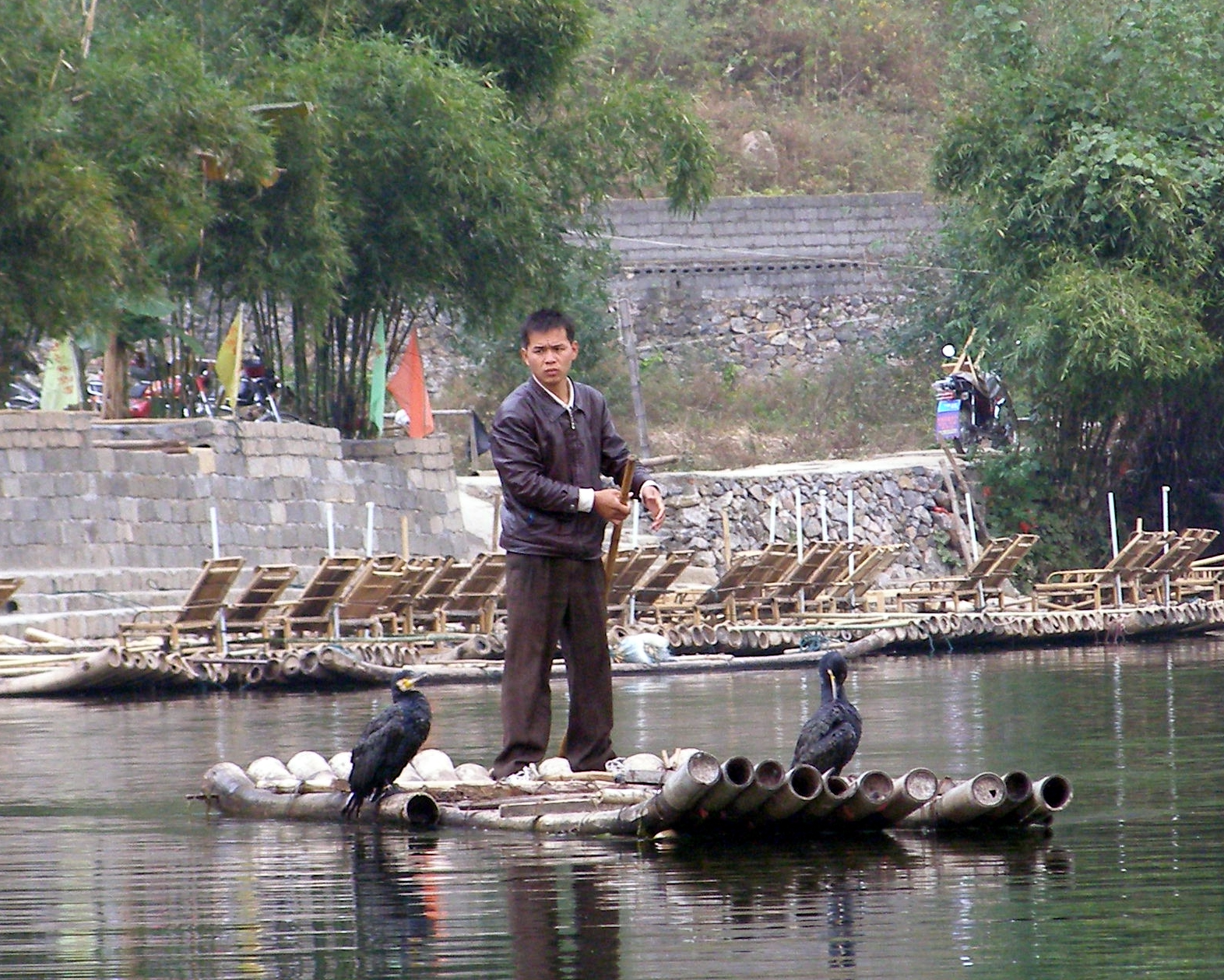
Cormorants used for fishing in China

== Indigenous people ==
Many indigenous people, particularly in coastal areas and near rivers, rely on fishing as their primary source of food.

== See also ==
- Fishing
- 2004 Indian Ocean earthquake and tsunami
- Artisanal food
- Blue justice
- Community-supported fishery
- Corf
- Fishing weir
- Fishing village
- Recreational fishing
- Rock fishing
- Subsistence agriculture
- Subsistence hunting of the bowhead whale
- Traditional fishing boat
