= AidData =

Research laboratory

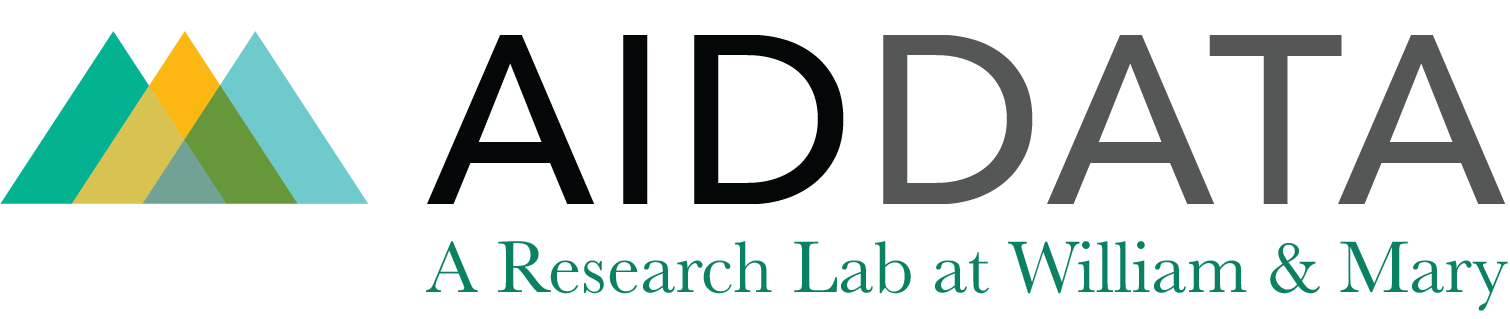
- Formation: March 23, 2009
- Type: Aid Transparency, Information Technology, Geocoding
- Headquarters: Williamsburg, VA
- Location: Williamsburg, VA
- Website: www.aiddata.org

AidData is an Aid Transparency, International Development, and Geocoding research institute formed on March 23, 2009. Its headquarters are in Williamsburg, Virginia, at the College of William & Mary. Its website provides access to development finance records from most official aid donors. AidData is led by Brad Parks, a research professor at William & Mary.

== History ==
AidData was formed in 2009 as a partnership between Brigham Young University (BYU), the College of William and Mary, and Development Gateway. The organization was formed through the merger of two prior initiatives: Project-Level Aid (PLAID) and Accessible Information on Development Activities (AiDA). PLAID, conceived in 2003, was a joint effort between BYU and William and Mary to provide data on foreign aid. AiDA was established in 2001 by Development Gateway to serve as a registry of aid activities to improve aid transparency and coordination. The organization released their searchable data portal of one million past and present development finance activities from over 90 funding agencies.

In 2016, the members of the AidData partnership agreed that AidData would function as a stand-alone development research and innovation lab at the College of William and Mary moving forward. AidData still maintains contact with their co-founders Development Gateway and Brigham Young University, and these organizations continue to contribute to AidData's work, including as members of the AidData Center for Development Policy.

== Information tools and resources ==
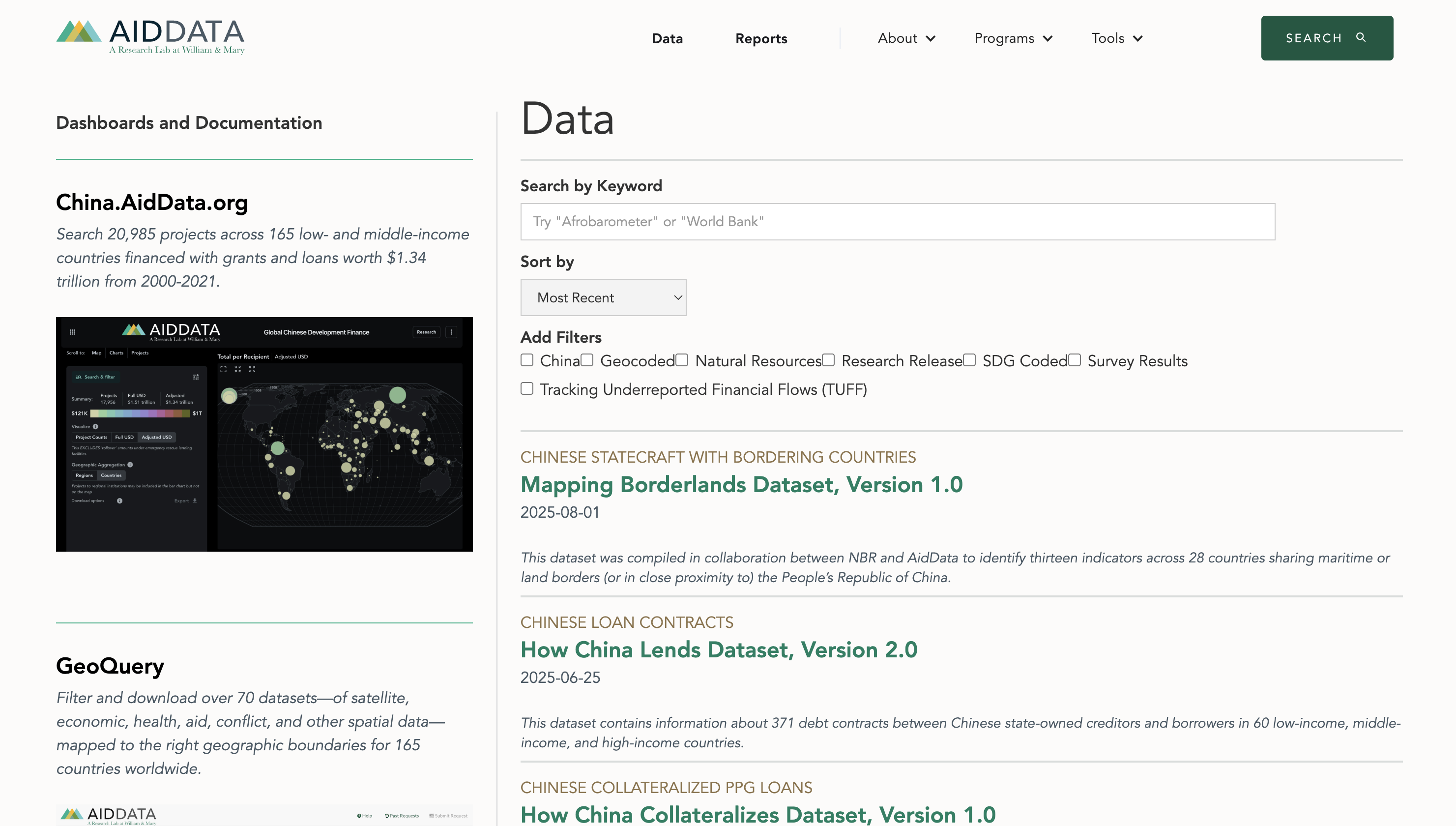
A screenshot of AidData's repository of all publicly available datasets and dashboards.

AidData's online resources include:

- The AidData database, a collection of information on individual foreign aid projects financed by governments and aid agencies between 1945 and the present.
- The website china.aiddata.org, an online platform centering around Chinese development finance flows to Africa.
- The First Tranche, a blog focusing on information about development finance, and how it can be used to improve development practice and research.
- Research, books, academic publications, working papers, and datasets related to aid effectiveness and aid allocation.
- Maps and information about geocoding aid activities.
- Innovation, Information about other AidData projects in development including (crowdsourcing and dashboards).

== Aid information in AidData database ==
AidData's main table database includes data from 96 donor agencies and multilateral organizations from 1945 to the present. Most of the aid activity records are republished with permission from the Creditor Reporting System (CRS), the central database for foreign aid compiled by the OECD's Development Assistance Committee (DAC), which is the official source of aid statistics for all DAC member countries. The database also includes information on the aid projects of some donors that do not report to the OECD, such as Brazil, South Africa, and China. The aid activities are classified according to a scheme based on the CRS codebook, but add individual activity codes under each purpose code headline. The beta version of the AidData portal was launched in March 2010 at a conference in Oxford, UK. AidData 2.0 was launched in November 2011 at the World Bank.

Several donors use the International development markup language (IDML) to report directly to AidData.

== Geocoding ==
In collaboration with Uppsala University, AidData developed the UCDP/AidData methodology for geocoding aid activities. The methodology is used to tag development aid activities with geographic coordinates, such that they can be pinpointed to geographic locations and displayed on a map. In partnership with the World Bank, AidData applied this methodology to the Mapping for Results initiative, through which geocoders mapped out more than 16,000 project locations for more than 2,700 active Bank activities across 81 countries, including all IDA recipient countries.

The UCDP/AidData Geocoding Methodology can be freely downloaded from the Open. AidData website.

== Publications based on AidData ==
Publications based on AidData resources include:

- ‘’Greening Aid: Understanding the Environmental Impact of Development Assistance.’’ Robert L. Hicks, Bradley C. Parks, J. Timmons Roberts, and Michael J. Tierney. Oxford University Press, 2008.
- "Can Peace Be Purchased? A Sectoral-level Analysis of Aid’s Influence on Transnational Terrorism." Joseph K. Young and Michael G. Findley. Public Choice 39 (3–4), 2011.
- "Foreign Aid Shocks as a Cause of Violent Armed Conflict." Richard A. Nielsen, Michael G. Findley, Zachary S. Davis, Tara Candland, and Daniel L. Nielson. American Journal of Political Science 55 (2), 2011.
- A Climate of Injustice: North-South Politics and Climate Policy. J. Timmons Roberts and Bradley C. Parks. MIT University Press, 2006.
- "Expanding Our Understanding of Aid with a New Generation in Development Finance Information." special issue World Development, eds. J. Timmons Roberts, Michael G. Findley and Darren G. Hawkins 39 (11), 2011.
- "Controlling Coalitions: Social Lending at the Multilateral Development Banks." Mona Lyne, Daniel L. Nielson, and Michael J. Tierney. Review of International Organizations 4 (4), 2009.
- "Who Ratifies Environmental Treaties and Why? Institutionalism, Structuralism, and Participation by 192 Nations in 22 Treaties." J. Timmons Roberts, Bradley C. Parks and Alexis A. Vásquez. Global Environmental Politics 4 (3), 2004.
- "Examining the relationship between international aid and mangrove deforestation in coastal Ecuador from 1970 to 2006." Stuart Edward Hamilton and Clare Stankwitz. Journal of Land Use Science, March 31, 2011.
- "Gendering Agricultural Aid: An Analysis of whether International Development Assistance Targets Women and Gender." Elizabeth Ransom and Carmen Bain. Gender and Society, January 20, 2011.

AidData is used as a source in the following publications:

- QuODA: an assessment of the quality of Official Development Assistance (ODA) provided by 23 donor countries and over 150 aid agencies. QuODA is produced by the Center for Global Development
- Publish What You Fund Aid Transparency Assessment: a global assessment of aid transparency. The assessment compares the transparency of 30 major donors based on their high-level commitment to transparency, transparency to recipient governments, and transparency to civil societies.
