= Mohammad Shafiq Hamdam =

- محمد شفیق همدم
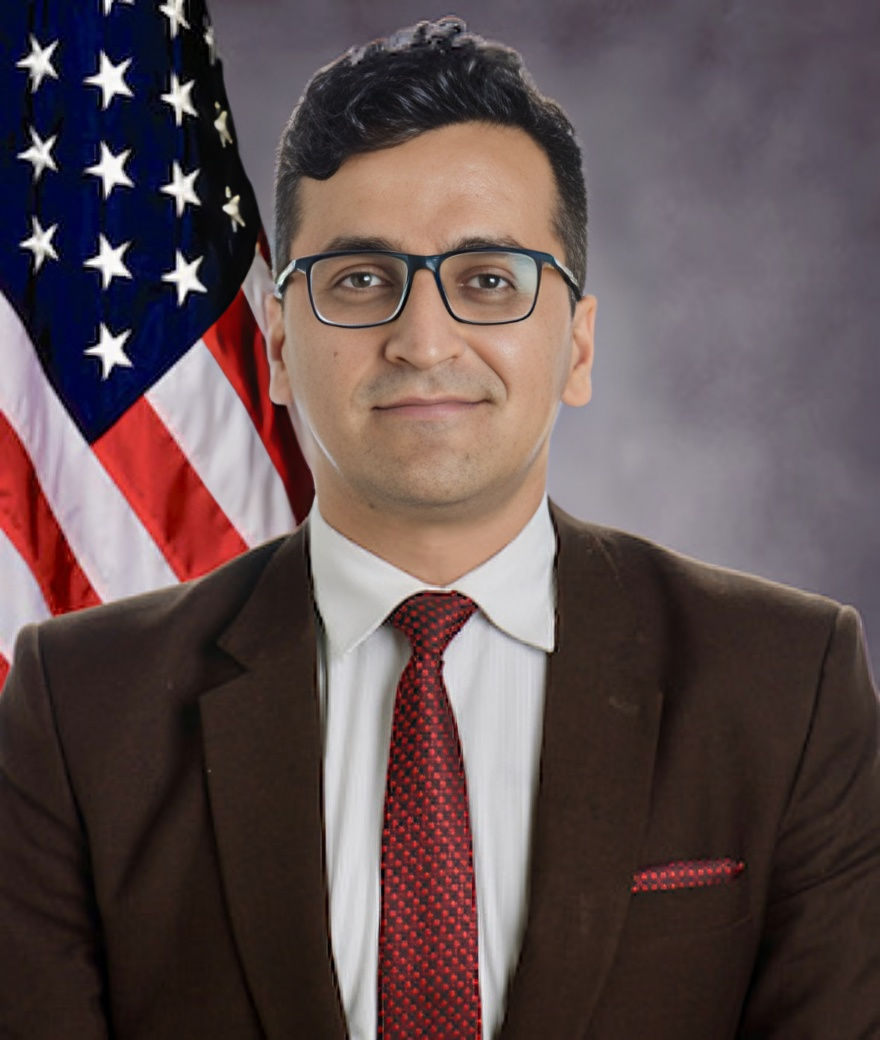
- Mohammad Shafiq Hamdam Official portrait, 2022
- Born: 1981 (age 44–45); Laghman Province, Democratic Republic of Afghanistan
- Education: George Washington University The Institute of World Politics
- Organization: Office of the President of the Islamic Republic of Afghanistan
- Known for: Political Activism and Big Tech
- Title: Presidential Advisor
- Movement: Integrity
- Awards: 2013 Nobel Peace Prize Nominee
- Website: www.president.gov.af

Mohammad Shafiq Hamdam (Dari: محمد شفیق همدم; born 1981) is an Afghan writer and analyst specializing in information technology, AI/ML, cloud computing, cybersecurity, and national security policy. He has previously served as a portfolio leader for Deloitte, IMF, and Deputy Senior Advisor and Senior Technical Director to the President of the Islamic Republic of Senior Advisor to NATO and the Chairman of the Afghan Anti-Corruption Network (AACN).

== Early life and education ==
Mohammad Shafiq Hamdam was born in 1981 in Alishing District, Laghman Province, Afghanistan. He attended local schools in Kabul, Laghman and Jalalabad before beginning studies in political science at Nangarhar University, which were interrupted during Taliban rule. Hamdam later earned a degree in health sciences from the Nangarhar Institute of Health Sciences and a diploma in administration and economics.

He completed postgraduate studies in security and international relations at the George Marshall Center for Security Studies in Germany (2010), a master’s degree in national security affairs from The Institute of World Politics in Washington D.C., and a master’s in cybersecurity engineering from George Washington University.

Hamdam's educational background is diverse, spanning sciences, administration, economics, security studies, international relations, and cybersecurity. In addition to his formal education, Hamdam's linguistic proficiency, combined with his diverse educational background, positions him as a candidate for international diplomacy and cross-cultural communication. His ability to communicate in multiple languages, including Dari, Pashto, Urdu, and English, is an asset in politics and security, bridging cultural gaps and fostering understanding.

== Career history ==
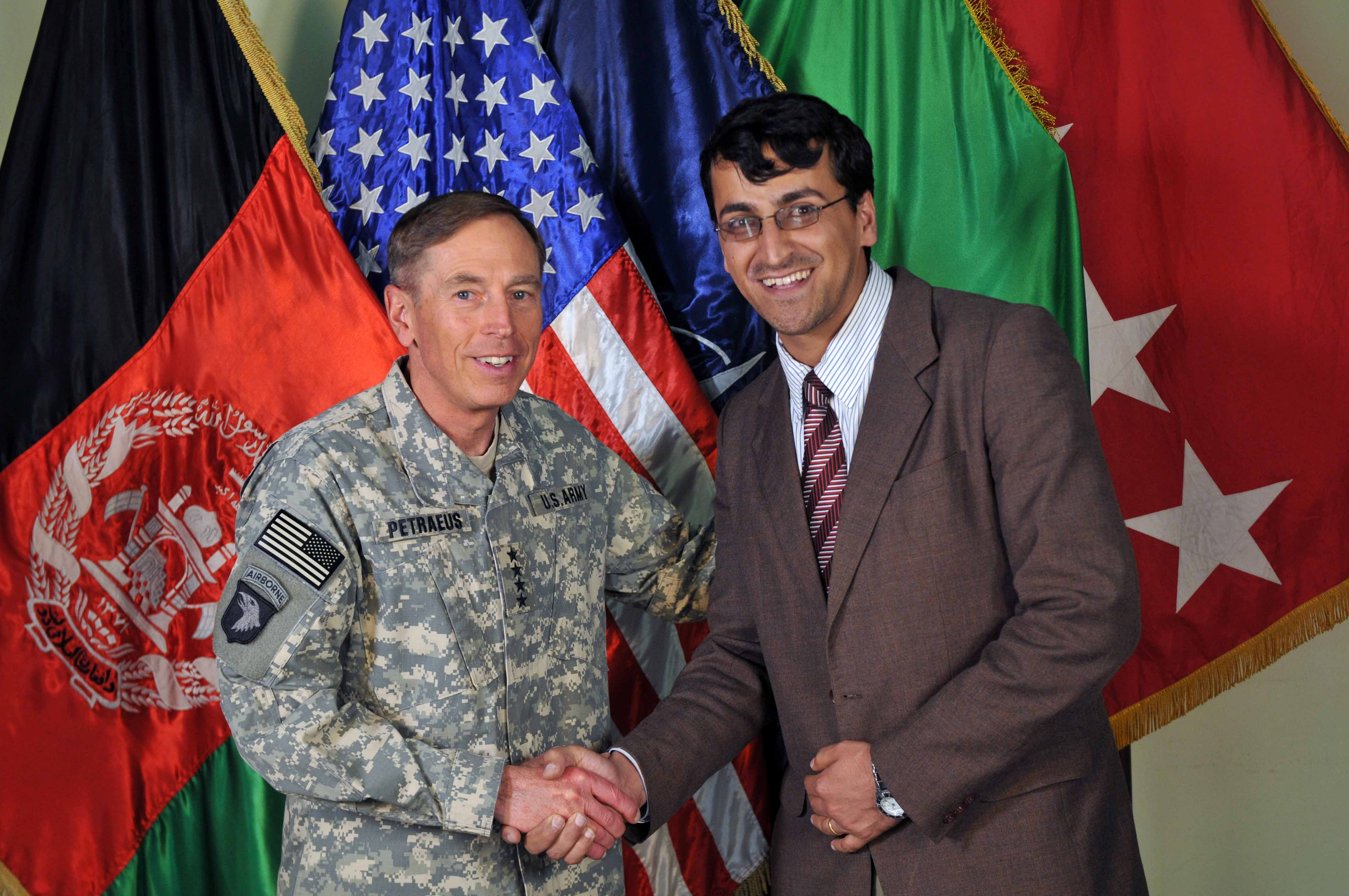
Hamdam and Gen. David Petraeus, former Director of the Central Intelligence Agency of the U.S. and former ISAF Commander, 2011.

Hamdam currently serves as a Senior Engagement Manager at Amazon Web Services and, before that, as a Senior Portfolio Leader at Deloitte, offering guidance and support to several Fortune 100 companies in AI/ML, cybersecurity, and information technology. Before these roles, he held the position of Senior Program Manager at the International Monetary Fund in Washington, D.C. In Afghanistan, Hamdam served as a Senior Technical Director and Deputy Senior Adviser to the President of the Islamic Republic of Afghanistan at the Senior Advisory Office of the President on UN Affairs (SAOP UN-Affairs).

The SAOP UN-Affairs played role in implementing One UN system for Afghanistan, a strategic framework that replaced the United Nations Development Assistance Framework (UNDAF) for Afghanistan. This involved successfully drafting a mutual accountability framework between the Government of Afghanistan and the United Nations, creating a single system for budget, programs, and data, and building the Development Assistance Database (DAD) an aid information management system (AIMS) developed by Synergy International Systems. The implementation of One UN or Delivering as One (DAO) presented significant challenges for both the UN family and the Afghan government; however, the SAOP achieved success in this endeavor. Under the new framework, the UN is mandated to align its budget, priorities, programs, and projects with Afghanistan's national strategies.

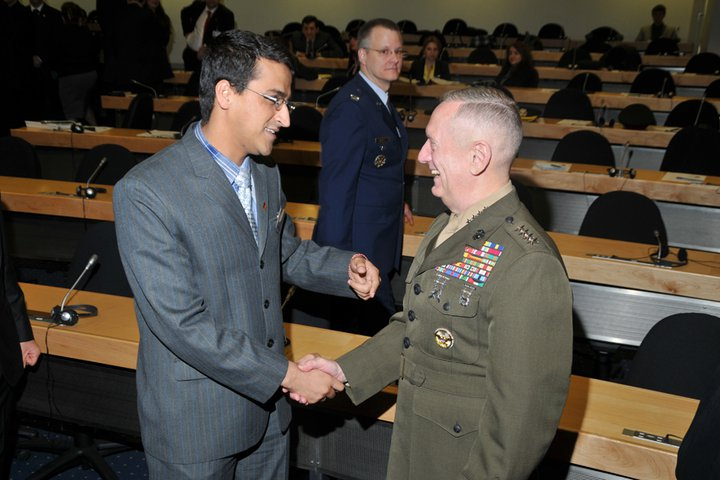
Mohammad Shafiq Hamdam with Gen James Mattis, U.S. Central Command and 26th United States Secretary of Defense

In his role as NATO's Senior Advisor, Hamdam played part in implementing the Virtual Silk Highway Project in Afghanistan. The NATO project to provide internet access to researchers and scientists in Central Asia and the Southern Caucasus is named after the historical Silk Road trade route. It uses satellite-based technology to connect these regions with the global internet, fostering collaboration and knowledge exchange. He also advised senior NATO, U.S., and international policymakers on the political and developmental dynamics of Afghanistan, South Asia, and Central Asia. Additionally, he serves as the Chairman of the Afghan Anti-Corruption Network (AACN) a coalition of civil society organizations dedicated to tackling corruption.

Mohammad Shafiq Hamdam at NATO Headquarters, Brussels, 2008

In addition to his advisory and analytical roles, Hamdam actively collaborates with numerous organizations. He sits on the Board of the Modern Organization for the Development of Education (MODE) and served as the chairman of the Anti-Corruption Watch Organization's executive board. He has also founded initiatives such as Youth For Peace, Afghan Youth Against Corruption, Anti-Corruption Watch Organization, and Kabul Tribune—an online newspaper. Additionally, Hamdam co-founded the Women's International Coalition Against Corruption.

Mohammad Shafiq Hamdam and Mohammad Qayoumi during a live debate on Afghanistan’s water and energy at the Presidential Palace

His affiliations include membership in the Afghan Young Leaders of the Friedrich-Ebert-Stiftung (FES), a position as Program Associate at the Hiroshima Peace Builders Center, and participation in the United Nations Coalition Against Corruption (UNCAC).

During the 2009 presidential and provincial elections of Afghanistan, Hamdam contributed as a presenter for political round-table discussions on Moby Media, TOLOnews. From 2001 to 2008, he held positions as a linguist, culture advisor, media coordinator, and spokesman for Operation Enduring Freedom - Afghanistan and the Department of Defense.

His journey into public service began in 2001 as a freelance interpreter. From 1998 to 2001, he served as a Project Manager with the World Health Organization in Jalalabad, eastern Afghanistan. The Asia Society recognized Hamdam as one of the 21 Young Asia Leaders.

== Fighting corruption ==
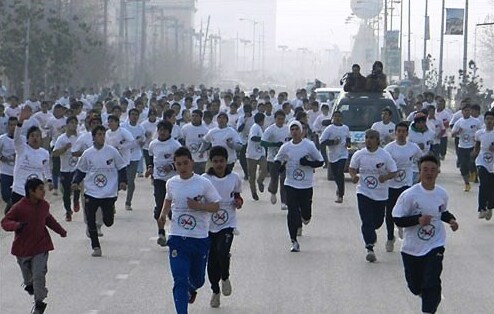
2013 Afghanistan Countrywide Race Against Corruption organized by Afghan Anti-Corruption Network, where thousands of Afghan youth took part to pressure the government for reform.

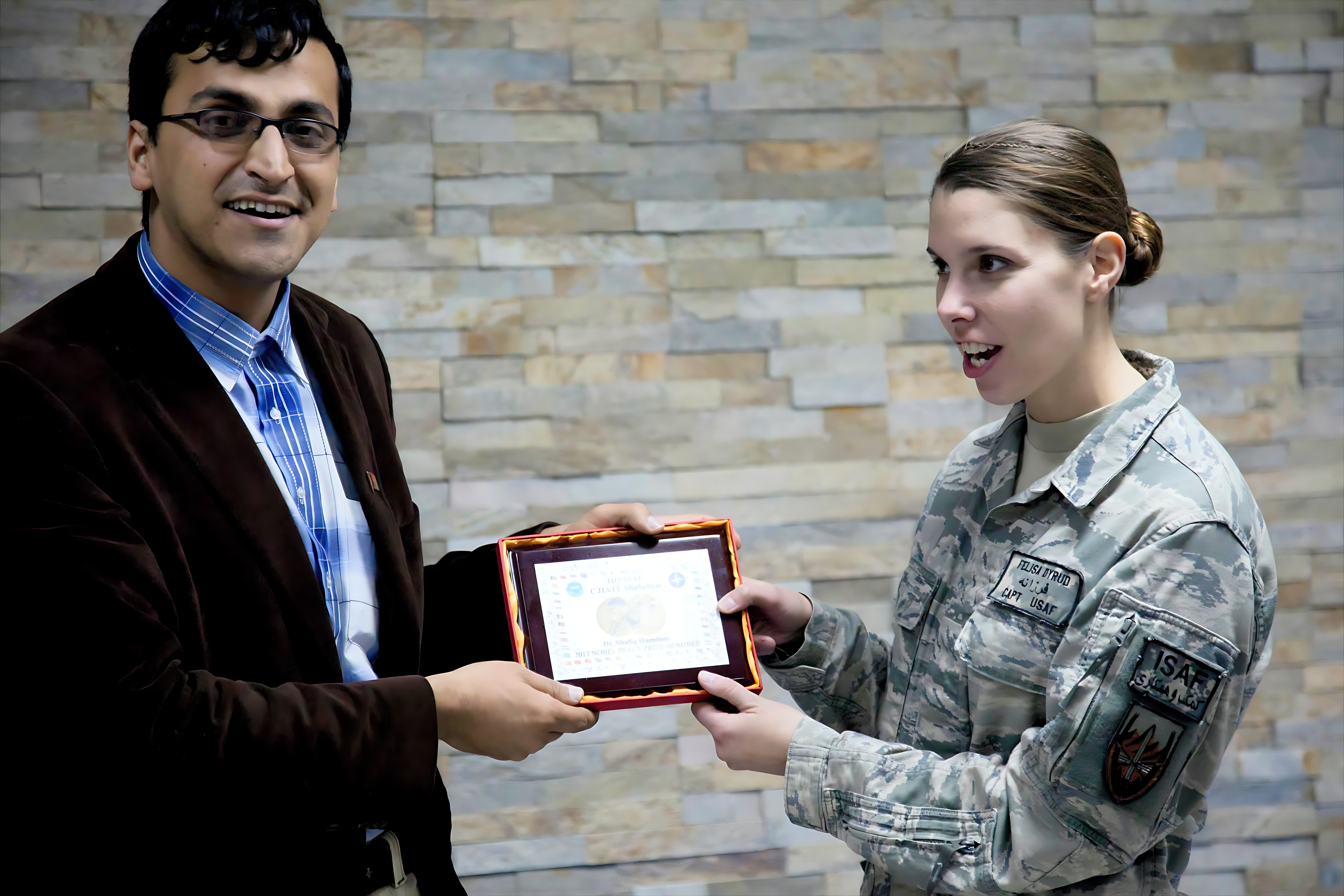
Farzana Marie, PhD, awards certificates of Nobel Peace Prize Nomination to Mohammad Shafiq Hamdam

Hamdam said that corruption is the biggest problem, which feeds insecurity in Afghanistan as well as the insurgency, poppy cultivation, drug processing, and drug trafficking. He organized a nationwide volunteer initiative against corruption across Afghanistan, the most dangerous and challenging job in one of the most corrupt and unstable countries in the world. Through peaceful demonstrations and protests such a 5 km countrywide race against corruption, he mobilized thousands of citizens to pressure the government to reform, through 5km race against corruption. He has also mobilized young people, students, and women to participate in the fight against corruption. He is an outspoken activist who has disclosed cases of senior corrupt officials. He has advocated for the trial and prosecution of cabinet members and senior politicians. Hamdam exposed land grabbing and corruption among senior government officials and cabinet members. He has advocated for election transparency and reform. He also played a role in exposing Kabul Bank corruption, where nearly one billion USD was looted in corruption, which resulted in the collapse of the bank.

Hamdam was a critic of the Karzai government for failing to take firm steps to combat corruption. In an interview with CBS TV, he stated that corruption originates from the streets and extends to the palace, and he described Karzai's government as the most corrupt government ever. He has repeatedly called on and pressured the Afghan government to fight corruption, viewing it as a significant problem for the country. For his contribution to transparency, justice, peace and security of Afghanistan, he was nominated for 2013 Nobel Peace Prize. He was nominated by Dr. Fatima Aziz, an Afghan MP and PhD Farzana Marie.

== Afghanistan's affairs ==
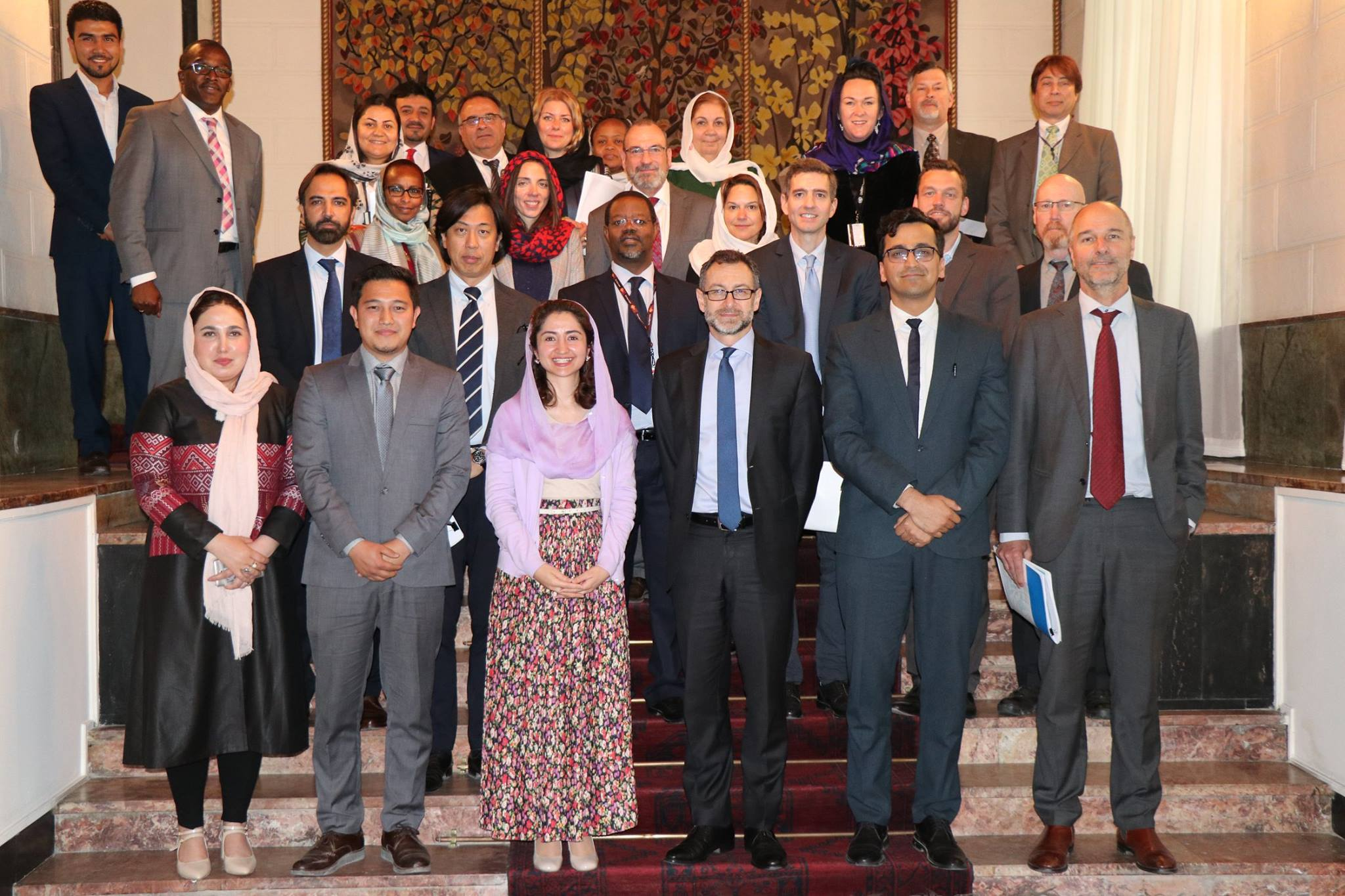
Mohammad Shafiq Hamdam with heads of UN agencies in Afghanistan at the Presidential Palace after the successful finalization of “One UN for Afghanistan.”

Hamdam closely follows the developments in Afghanistan and the countries of the region. Following Afghanistan's affairs as an observer, he has attended key International Conferences on Afghanistan, NATO Ministerial and NATO Summits. As an observer he observed Afghanistan presidential elections in 2004 and 2009, Afghan parliamentary and provincial elections in 2005 and the Traditional Loya Jirga on the Afghanistan-U.S. Strategic Partnership Agreement.

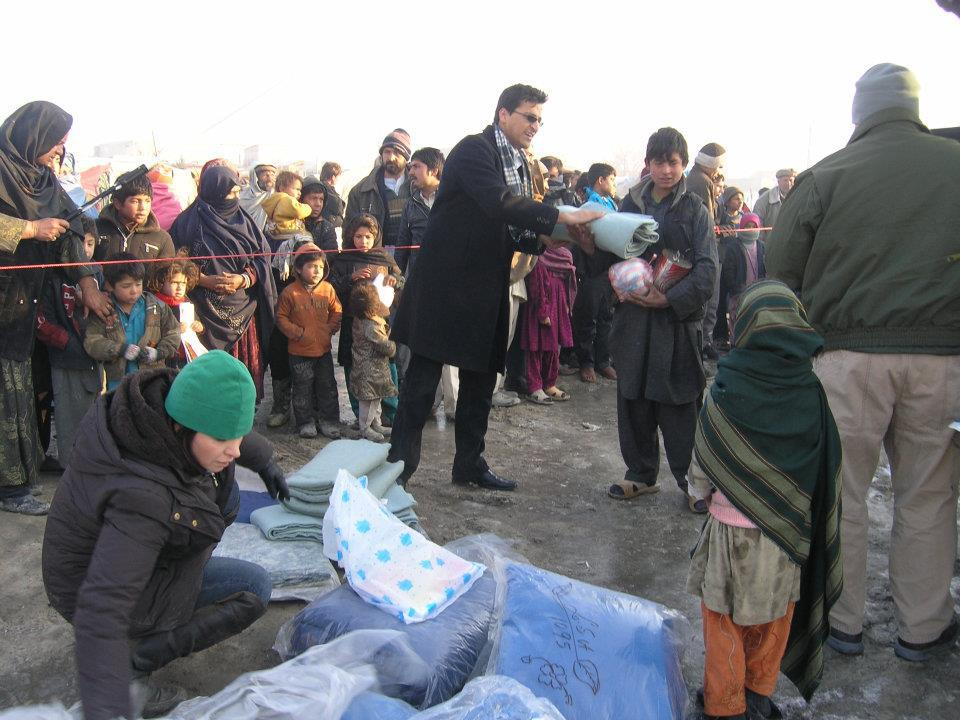
Hamdam during the distribution of humanitarian assistance to a needy family of displaced persons in Afghanistan.

Advocating for a closer relationship with the western allies, Hamdam played a role in signing the U.S.–Afghanistan Strategic Partnership Agreement between Afghanistan and US. Among other Afghan leaders and activists, he also signed the letter to President Obama advocating for the BSA, which said: "We strongly echo the endorsement of the Bilateral Security Agreement last month at the' Loya Jirga 'and reiterate that the agreement should be signed without delay." Our voice reflects a growing chorus from all segments of Afghan society, including our religious and business community leaders, who remain concerned about the future of our country and wish to see the BSA finalized expeditiously.

Mohammad Shafiq Hamdam addressing the European Parliament Committee on Foreign Affairs.

Representing Afghanistan in the European Parliament, he advocates for peace, accountability, transparency, and fighting corruption. He urged the leadership of the European Union, the European Parliament, and the European Commission to support Afghans in their fight against corruption. He wrote in one of his articles to E.U. leaders: Afghanistan alone cannot reach its goal of reducing corruption; it requires the support of the international community. Without delay, serious actions should be taken to eliminate the problem. These actions should include empowering civil society organizations and the media to play a bigger role in the fight against corruption. If Afghanistan is to qualify for aid over the coming years, a serious commitment, determination, and practical decisions will be necessary to implement the laws and strategies needed to overcome corruption in Afghanistan.

Hamdam was often criticized by some Afghan politicians and anti-Western figures for his pro-Western opinions. He is seen as pro-West. As a Senior NATO Public Diplomacy Adviser, he has often defended NATO policies, and extremists see him as a NATO-backed activist. Hamdam has defended NATO's positions on numerous occasions and has advocated for Afghanistan to become a NATO member. Muslim extremists and regional actors widely criticized him for his article, in which he clearly stated that Afghanistan should be a NATO member. After the completion of the ISAF mission, he advised in one of his articles that "the Afghan government and NATO should be able to enter a new, comprehensive, closer, stronger, and mutual relationship. It should be based on mutual commitment and long-term cooperation, with full respect for Afghanistan's sovereignty. The relation that can make Afghanistan a NATO member country in the future." While some analysts called the ISAF mission a failure, Hamdam called it a win. Hamdam opposed the U.S. and NATO withdrawal from Afghanistan and warned for consequences, including regional power plays and potential conflicts with the neighboring countries.

== As a writer ==
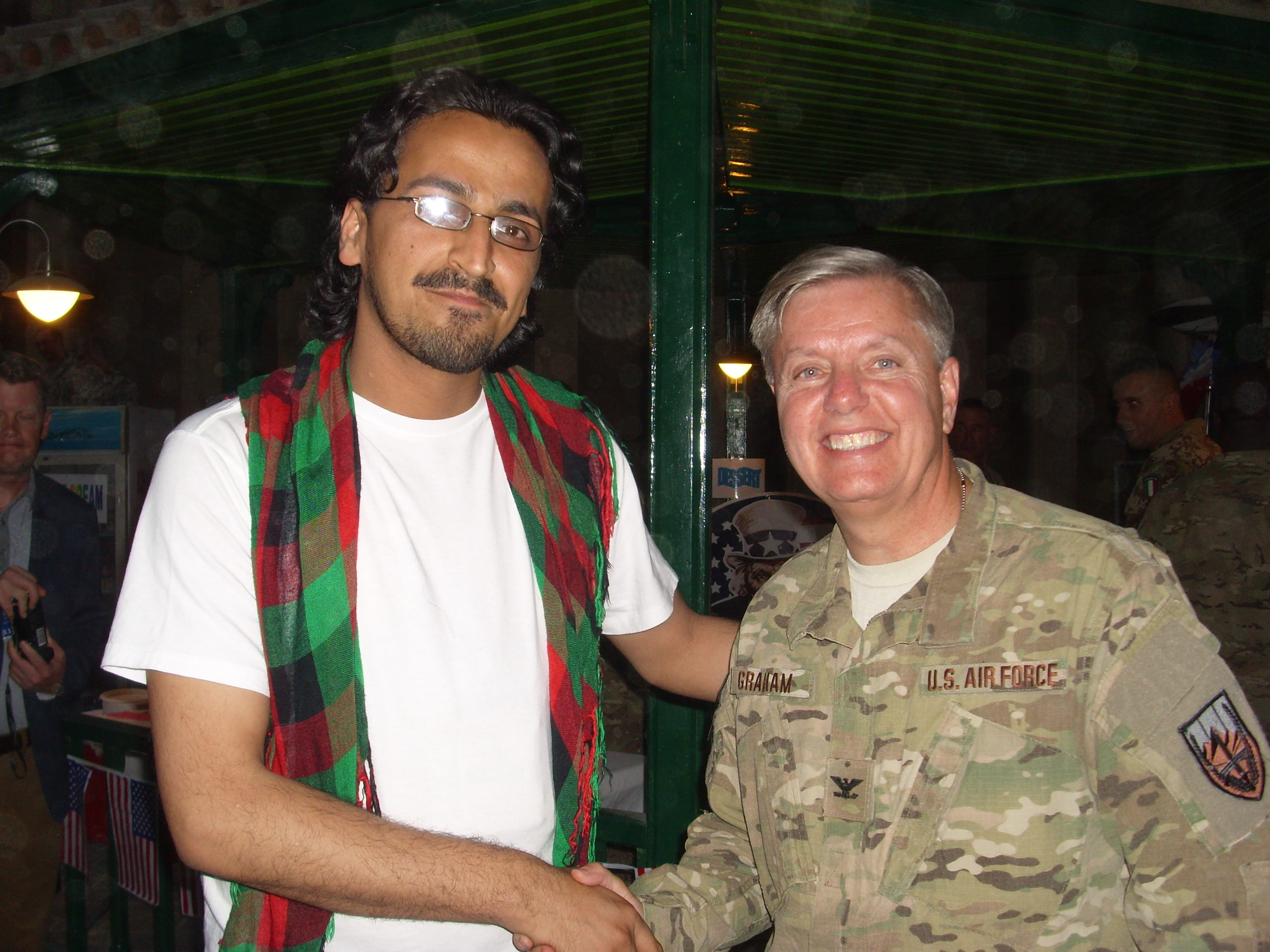
Hamdam with U.S. Senator Lindsey Graham

He writes for The Huffington Post and many leading newspapers and journals on political, security and foreign affairs. Talking about the corruption related issues and Afghanistan's affairs he has been appearing in numbers of national and International media outlets, such as Tolo News TV, Khaama Press News Agency, RFE/RL, BBC, CNBC, CBS, The Guardian, VOA, TRT TV, Aljazeera TV, The Washington Post and other key national and international media outlets.

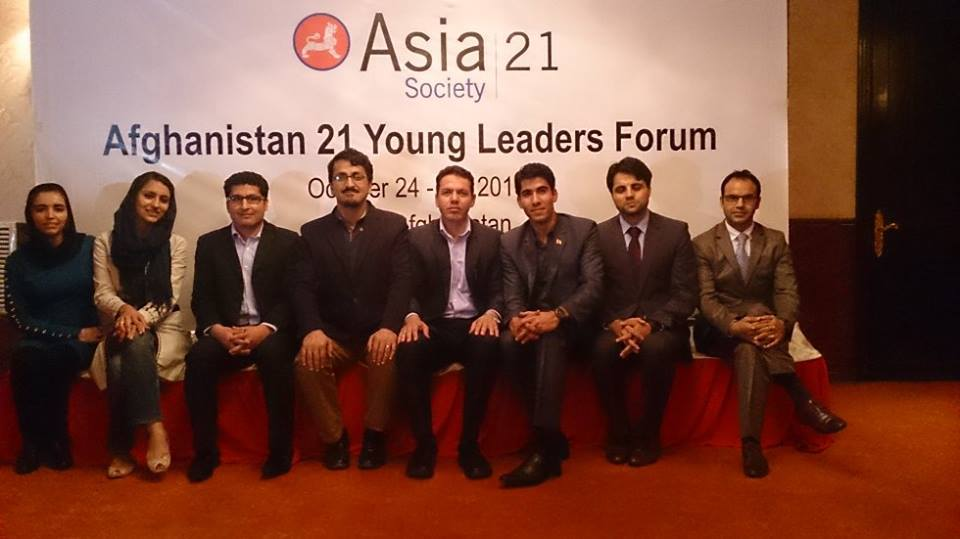
Hamdam among Asia 21 Yong Leaders

In an op-ed published in Khaama Press, Hamdam wrote that Afghanistan should not return to its previous period of instability. That Afghanistan of 2001 is not comparable with Afghanistan of 2015. With 352,000-strong Afghan National Security Forces, backed by the U.S. and NATO, an increasingly vibrant civil society sector, and a large youth population, Afghans are hopeful that their country will never return to the dark era. For this to remain effective, Afghanistan and its partners must continue to build on these achievements over the next decade, ushering in a new era of transformation.

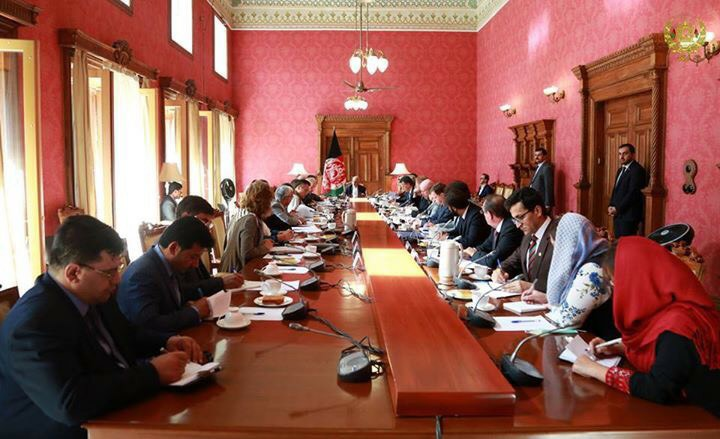
Mohammad Shafiq Hamdam With President Ashraf Ghani and Head of UN Agencies

Hamdam looks at democracy as a new phenomenon in Afghanistan and emphasizes reform and fighting corruption. He wrote in Unipath a professional military magazine published quarterly by the Commander of the United States Central Command as an international forum for military personnel in the Middle East and Central Asia region: Governments and institutions work differently in democratic societies. He claims that it is not only fighting terrorism and extremism but also good governance that are key priorities for Afghanistan. He sees the weak rule of law and the existence of "impunity circles" and safe havens for corrupt individuals and officials in Afghanistan and abroad as the primary contributors to violations of human rights and injustice.

Mohammad Shafiq Hamdam recovering after being injured in the August 15, 2009 Kabul bombing near NATO Headquarters.

He believes that the Afghan and U.S. governments were not able to define their relationship for more than a decade. Hamdam wrote in his opinion editorial, A Decade of Relations Without Definition, that the Afghan-U.S. relationship should not be based only on dying and killing for each other. Still, it should be based on social, economic and political interests as well. Numerous opportunities already exist to build that long-term and stable relationship. At the moment, some Afghans see the presence of the U.S. in Afghanistan as a world policing force against Al-Qaeda and the Taliban. Hamdam is advocating for peace in Afghanistan, and he believes that through only military means, the war in Afghanistan cannot end. However, the Taliban repeatedly asked for the full U.S. troops withdrawal. Still, Hamdam wants the U.S. and NATO's long-term presence in Afghanistan.

On August 15, 2009, Hamdam was wounded in a suicide car bombing near NATO Headquarters in Kabul. The attack killed several people and injured nearly one hundred others. Hamdam sustained multiple injuries, including shrapnel wounds to his face and body, and required surgery on his eye. He later returned to professional duties after a period of medical treatment and recovery.
