= Accountable Now =

Accountable Now is a global platform, founded in 2008 by a group of independent non-profit organisations, which is intended to foster accountability and transparency of civil society organisations (CSOs), as well as stakeholder communication and performance. It supports CSOs to be transparent, responsive to stakeholders and focused on delivering impact.

Accountable Now was founded under the name International NGO Charter of Accountability by eleven leading CSOs, including development, humanitarian, environmental, rights-based and advocacy organisations. As Membership and global collaboration increase, CSOs collective voices are strengthened. Today, 29 Member Organisations are active in more than 150 countries and impact stakeholders all over the world.

Legally registered as a Charity in Germany (under the name INGO International NGO Accountability Charter gUG.), Accountable Now's Secretariat is based in Berlin.

== Background ==
CSOs are more important than ever before in framing and influencing social, political and economic environments. On the national level they provide disaster relief and social service, promote self-help and self- governance in developing countries where they are operating. In addition they enhance a strong international Civil Society by creating informal but important normative regimes which are influencing international institutions in their decision-making. This greater involvement of CSOs also raises the question of how they justify their activities.

CSOs have a particular interest in meeting standards on accountability and transparency in view of the responsibilities towards not only the cause which they are meant to serve, but also stakeholders of various types, including donors and sponsors (possibly comprising corporations and governments), intended program beneficiaries, staff and the general public.

Accountable Now is considered a contributing element to underscoring the legitimacy of CSOs.

== Origins ==
=== Development ===
At the International Advocacy Non-Government Organisations (IANGO) Workshop hosted by Transparency International in June 2003, the importance of promoting accountability and legitimacy was discussed by its participants. As they recognised their growing involvement in international issues the need of promoting accountability was highlighted. The Hauser Center for Non-Profit Organisations at the Harvard University was asked for a research paper on the topic to provide a foundation for following discussions. At the following annual meetings in 2004 and 2005 the participants analysed their own concepts of accountability, set up an initial draft and with the help of independent consultant specialists revised the draft until a final version was ready to launch.

=== Adoption ===
The INGO Accountability Charter, signed in June 2006 by eleven leading international NGOs active in the area of human rights, environment and social development, set the course for the establishment of Accountable Now (then known as the INGO Accountability Charter) and it has been referred to as "the first ever set of international and cross-sector guidelines for the NGO sector" and the "first global accountability charter for the non-profit sector".

=== Founding Signatories ===
The founding signatories were ActionAid International, Amnesty International, CIVICUS World Alliance for Citizen Participation, Consumers International, Greenpeace International, Oxfam International, International Save the Children Alliance, Survival International, International Federation Terre des Hommes, Transparency International and World YWCA.

== Articles ==
The charter is based on ten core principles and aimed at enhancing respect for human rights, good governance, accountability and transparency, encouraging stakeholder communication, promoting inclusion and environmental responsibility, and improving organisational performance and effectiveness. It documents the commitment of international NGOs to these aims.

== Organisation ==
In 2008, the signatory-NGOs decided to found an independent organisation of the same name International NGO Accountability Charter Ltd in order to organise the reporting and vetting process of the member organisations against the charter commitments and develop them further. Today, the organisation operates under the name Accountable Now and has 29 member organisations.

== Related codes of conduct ==
In 1997, the One World Trust had created an NGO Charter, a code of conduct comprising commitment to accountability and transparency.

== See also ==
- International Aid Transparency Initiative
- Publish What You Fund
- Transparency International
- Accountable Now
