= Monterrey Consensus =

The Monterrey Consensus was the outcome of the 2002 Monterrey Conference, the United Nations International Conference on Financing for Development. in Monterrey, Mexico. It was adopted by Heads of State and Government on 22 March 2002.

The Monterrey Consensus was updated at Doha in 2008, Addis Ababa in 2015, and again at Seville in 2025.

== 2002 Consensus ==
Over fifty Heads of State and two hundred Ministers of Finance, Foreign Affairs, Development and Trade participated in the event. Governments were joined by the Heads of the United Nations, the International Monetary Fund (IMF), the World Bank and the World Trade Organization (WTO), prominent business and civil society leaders and other stakeholders. New development aid commitments from the United States and the European Union and other countries were made at the conference. Countries also reached agreements on other issues, including debt relief, fighting corruption, and policy coherence.

Since its adoption the Monterrey Consensus has become the major reference point for international development cooperation. The document embraces six areas of Financing for Development:

1. Mobilizing domestic financial resources for development.
2. Mobilizing international resources for development: foreign direct investment and other private flows.
3. International Trade as an engine for development.
4. Increasing international financial and technical cooperation for development.
5. External Debt.
6. Addressing systemic issues: enhancing the coherence and consistency of the international monetary, financial and trading systems in support of development.

Some critics suggest that the US has ignored the Monterrey Consensus because the amount of US official development assistance (0.18% of its gross domestic product in 2008), is still well below the 0.7% target, which it endorsed in the Consensus. It is much lower than some other developed countries, especially those in Northern Europe. The United Kingdom, for example, reached its target of giving at least 0.7% of GNI in official aid in 2014.

== 2008 follow-up Conference in Doha, Qatar ==
The Follow-up International Conference on Financing for Development to Review the Implementation of the Monterrey Consensus (Doha, Qatar, 28 November – 2 December 2008) was attended by some 40 Heads of State or Government, 9 Deputy Heads of State or Government, 50 ministers and 17 vice-ministers of foreign affairs, finance, development cooperation and trade, as well as other high-level officials of 170 States and major institutional stakeholders.

Doha Declaration

Following intense intergovernmental negotiations, the Conference concluded with the adoption of the Doha Declaration on Financing for Development (http://www.un.org/esa/ffd/doha/documents/Doha_Declaration_FFD.pdf). The two key messages included in the document were a strong commitment by developed countries to maintain their Official Development Assistance (ODA) targets irrespective of the 2008 financial crisis, and a decision to hold a UN Conference at the highest level on the impact of the current financial and economic crisis on development.

Other main highlights of the Doha Declaration are:

Domestic resource mobilization: the importance of national ownership of development strategies and of an inclusive financial sector, as well as the need for strong policies on good governance, accountability, gender equality and human development.

Mobilizing international resources for development: the need to improve the enabling environment and to expand the reach of private flows to a greater number of developing countries.

International trade as an engine for development: the importance of concluding the Doha round of multilateral trade negotiations as soon as possible.

External debt: the need to strengthen crisis prevention mechanisms and to consider enhanced approaches for debt restructuring mechanisms.

Addressing systemic issues: the need to review existing global economic governance arrangements, with a view to comprehensive reforms of the international financial system and institutions.

Plenary meetings

The Conference was chaired by the Emir of Qatar and included seven plenary meetings. A total of 133 Governments made statements to the plenary. The Secretary-General of the United Nations, the President of the General Assembly, the Director-General of WTO, the Secretary-General of UNCTAD and the Administrator of UNDP spoke at the opening.

In their statements, Member States took stock of the progress made in the implementation of the Monterrey Consensus, identified obstacles and constraints encountered and put forward ideas and proposals to overcome these difficulties. Many statements focused on the consequences of the 2008 financial crisis for development and the need for bold and urgent measures to address them. Much attention was also devoted to the food and energy crises and to the untapped potential of innovative sources of finance.

Amb. Oscar de Rojas, a former Venezuelan diplomat and Director of the U.N.'s Financing for Development Office, served as Executive Secretary of both the Doha and Monterrey conferences.

Round tables

Six interactive multi-stakeholder round tables were held concurrently with the plenary meetings, centering on the six thematic areas of the Monterey Consensus. Each round table was co-chaired by two Heads of State or Government and ministers from developing and developed countries and moderated by a high-level official of the major institutional stakeholders.

Panelists included HRH Princess Maxima of the Netherlands; S-G’s Special Envoys for the Conference, Mr. Trevor Manuel, South African Finance Minister and Ms. Heidemarie Weiczorek-Zeul, German Minister for Development Cooperation. Following presentations by panelists, interactive discussions took place among representatives of Member States, inter-governmental organizations, UN agencies, civil society and the business sector.

Pre-conference events

The Conference was preceded by a high-level retreat on the 2008 financial crisis, hosted on 28 November by the Secretary-General of the United Nations and the Emir of Qatar. The retreat was attended by some 30 Heads of State or Government and ministers from both developed and developing countries, as well as high-level representatives of the major institutional stakeholders. The retreat was meant to serve as a “bridge” between the discussions on the 2008 financial crisis that had taken place among smaller groups of countries and the wider membership of the United Nations.

A Global Forum of Civil Society was held from 26 to 27 November on the theme “Investing in people-centered development” and attracted participation of more than 250 civil society organizations and networks. In addition, an International Business Forum, held on 28 November focused on mobilizing private sector resources for development and was attended by more than 200 participants from the private sector.

Side events

More than 50 side events took place at the Conference site. In the spirit of Monterrey, the organizers were Governments, inter-governmental and non-governmental organizations and the business sector. The issues of inclusive and innovative financing for development featured prominently in several side events. High-level speakers included: HRH Princess Maxima of the Netherlands, the President of Tanzania.

Source: http://www.un.org/esa/desa/desaNews/v13n01/global.html#Doha

For more information: http://www.un.org/esa/ffd/doha/index.htm

Press and NGO reactions to the Doha Conference

The press noted that few leaders of Western countries attended the meeting. The meeting was also marked by the absence of the heads of the Bretton Woods institutions (World Bank and IMF). The United States aid chief still thought the meeting was worthwhile, and welcomed the outcome. Other, such as the Eurodad network criticised it.

- Conference website: http://www.un.org/esa/ffd/doha/

== 2015: Third International Conference on Financing for Development in Addis Ababa ==
The Third International Conference on Financing for Development was held in Addis Ababa, Ethiopia, from 13 to 16 July 2015. It adopted the Addis Ababa Action Agenda (AAAA). The conference focused on tackling a wide-variety of social, economic and environmental challenges caused by financial practices and financial markets/systems.

13 July:

UN Secretary-General (UNSG) Ban Ki-moon opened the Conference and outlined its mandate. The Prime Minister of Ethiopia was elected to the Committee Chair. The Prime Minister said that this could present a huge opportunity to move away from business as usual. Following, the Committee Chair, Ban outlined his sustainable development goals, which focused on fixing social and economic problems, and on gender equality. Sam Kuetesa, president of the UN General Assembly highlighted the need and focus on: increasing domestic resources, improving infrastructure, and contribution to the new development agenda. Jim Yong Kim (President of the World Bank Group), announced the intention of unnamed multilateral development banks to provide $400 billion dollars in funding. The IMF, and CTO also commented on how they were doing to help improvished countries, and rest of the opening plenaries focused on debt, gender equality, or developmental projects in Africa.

14 July:

Plenries continued into the second day, Alexander De Croo, Deputy Prime Minister, Belgium, provided support for his plans on combating licit financial flows. Bülent Arınç, Deputy Prime Minister, Turkey, announced Turkey’s intention to open a bank for technology, and research, dedicated towards lower-income countries. Matteo Renzi, Prime Minister, Italy, emphasized the importance of job growth. A roundtable was hosted, and it was moderated by Min Zhu, Deputy Managing Director of the IMF, and it was co-chaired by Per Bolund, Minister for Financial Markets and Consumer Affairs, Sweden, and Andrés Escobar Arango, Deputy Minister of Finance, Colombia. This roundtable focused on gender equality and access to sustainable development/debt. The Third Roundtable, focused on 'three dimensions of sustainable growth', it was moderated by Helen Clark, Administrator, UN Development Programme.

15 July:

Initial plenries were given; and they focused on how to identify middle-income or developing countries, private flows and infrastructure, multilateralism, climate change, public debt, migration, gender equality and taxes. Roundtable 4 focused on policy coherance and sustainable development, it was moderated by Mukhisa Kituyi, Secretary-General, UN Conference on Trade and Development. Roundtable 5, focused on the same topics as Roundtable 4, and it was moderated by Yi Xiaozhun, Deputy Director-General, World Trade Organization.

== 2025: Fourth International Conference on Financing for Development in Seville ==
The Fourth International Conference on Financing for Development was held in Seville, Spain, from 30 June to 3 July 2025. The conference adopted the Sevilla Commitment, which was later adopted by the General Assembly as resolution A/RES/79/323. The government of Spain and the United Nations also organized the Sevilla Platform for Action as a voluntary, multi-stakeholder mechanism to ensure the early implementation of the Sevilla Commitment.

== See also ==
- Development Assistance Committee
- Aid effectiveness
- Washington Consensus
- United Nations Millennium Campaign
