= International Development Association =

International financial institution, member of the World Bank Group

- Association internationale de développement
- IDA logo
- Formation: 1960; 66 years ago
- Type: Development finance institution
- Legal status: Treaty
- Purpose: Development assistance, Poverty reduction
- Headquarters: Washington, D.C., United States
- Members: 174 countries
- Parent organization: World Bank Group
- Website: worldbank.org/ida

The International Development Association (IDA) (French: Association internationale de développement) is a development finance institution which offers concessional loans and grants to the world's poorest developing countries. The IDA is a member of the World Bank Group and is headquartered in Washington, D.C. in the United States. It was established in 1960 to complement the existing International Bank for Reconstruction and Development by lending to developing countries which suffer from the lowest gross national income, from troubled creditworthiness, or from the lowest per capita income. Together, the International Development Association and International Bank for Reconstruction and Development are collectively generally known as the World Bank, as they follow the same executive leadership and operate with the same staff.

The association shares the World Bank's mission of reducing poverty and aims to provide affordable development financing to countries whose credit risk is so prohibitive that they cannot afford to borrow commercially or from the Bank's other programs. The IDA's stated aim is to assist the poorest nations in growing more quickly, equitably, and sustainably to reduce poverty. The IDA is the single largest provider of funds to economic and human development projects in the world's poorest nations. From 2000 to 2010, it financed projects which recruited and trained 3 million teachers, immunized 310 million children, funded $792 million in loans to 120,000 small and medium enterprises, built or restored 118,000 kilometers of paved roads, built or restored 1,600 bridges, and expanded access to improved water to 113 million people and improved sanitation facilities to 5.8 million people. The IDA has issued a total US$238 billion in loans and grants since its launch in 1960. Thirty-six of the association's borrowing countries have graduated from their eligibility for its concessional lending. However, nine of these countries have relapsed and have not re-graduated.

== History ==
=== Background ===
During the 1940s and 1950s, low-income developing countries began to realize that they could no longer afford to borrow capital and needed more-favorable lending terms than offered by the International Bank for Reconstruction and Development (IBRD). At the onset of his inaugural term in 1949, then-president of the United States Harry S. Truman assembled an advisory group to suggest ways to accomplish his Point Four Program, of which a significant component was an effort to strengthen developing countries, especially those nearest to the Eastern Bloc, to dissuade them from aligning with other communist states. The advisory group recommended an international mechanism that would function somewhere in between providing strictly-loaned and strictly-granted funds. The UN and United States government published reports expressing support for the creation of a multilateral, concessional lending program for the poorest developing countries. However, the United States was largely unresponsive and ultimately distracted by its involvement in the Korean War and unconvinced that development needed greater financial stimulation.

Developing countries grew increasingly frustrated with not being able to afford IBRD lending and perceived the Marshall Plan as a comparatively generous gift to European nations. In the late 1940s and early 1950s, developing countries began calling for the United Nations (UN) to create a development agency that would offer technical support and concessional financing, with a particular desire that the agency adhere to other UN bodies' convention of each country having one vote as opposed to a weighted vote. However, the United States ultimately opposed proposals of that nature. As the United States grew more concerned over the growth of the Cold War, it made a concession in 1954 at the behest of its Department of State by backing the conception of the International Finance Corporation (IFC). Despite the launch of the IFC in 1956, developing countries persisted in demanding the creation of a new concessional financing mechanism and the idea gained traction within the IBRD. Then-President of the IBRD Eugene R. Black, Sr. began circulating the notion of an International Development Association, as opposed to an idea of a concessional named the Special United Nations Fund for Economic Development (SUNFED) governed by the United Nations. Paul Hoffman, the Marshall Plan's former administrator, proposed the idea of a soft-loan facility within the World Bank, where the US would have a preponderant voice in the allocation of such loans. Democratic senator Mike Monroney of Oklahoma supported this idea. As Chairman of the Senate Subcommittee on International Finance, Monroney proposed a resolution recommending a study of the potential establishment of an International Development Association to be affiliated with the IBRD. Monroney's proposal was more preferred received within the United States than the SUNFED. The resolution passed the senate in 1958, and then-U.S. treasury secretary Robert B. Anderson encouraged other countries to conduct similar studies. In 1959, the World Bank's Board of Governors approved a U.S.-born resolution calling for the drafting of the articles of agreement. SUNFED later became the Special Fund and merged with the Expanded Programme of Technical Assistance to form the United Nations Development Programme.

=== Founding ===
By the end of January 1960, fifteen countries signed the articles of agreement which established the International Development Association. The association launched in September of that same year with an initial budget of $913 million ($7.1 billion in 2012 dollars). Over the next eight months following its launch, the IDA grew to 51 member states and loaned $101 million ($784.2 million in 2012 dollars) to four developing countries.

=== 1960–1979 ===
By 1978, the IAD had grown its available resources to approximately $18.1 billion ($89.4 billion in 2025 dollars) split between approximately $1.1 billion ($5.4 billion in 2025 dollars) in recurring funding from member governments and approximately $15.6 billion ($77.1 billion in 2025 dollars) in supplementary contributions. The primary focus of this lending was for Agriculture and rural development representing approximately $1.34 billion ($6.6 billion in 2025 dollars) or 58% of all credits, for uses such as establishing dairy cooporatives in India or grain storage and marking systems in Ethiopia.

=== 1980–1999 ===
Inn 1983, the UN reported that more than 50 countries were eligible to receive loans from IDA with a gross national product of less than $796 per person ($2,821 in 2025 dollars). Loans at the time were interest free, but carried service charges of .75 % on disbursed amounts and .5% on undispersed balances. The loans had 10-year grace periods and were then repayable over 50-year terms. The number of countries eligible to receive funds grew to 81 countries by the end of 1999, with lending reaching $6.8 billion ($13.2 billion in 2025 dollars).

=== 2000–2019 ===
IDA grew to $8.7 billion ($14.4 in 2025 dollars) in 2005, covering 160 projects in 66 countries. Of these, the largest commitments were for projects in Africa totaling $3.9 billion ($6.4 in 2025 dollars). Total membership in the IDA stood at 165 countries by the end of the 2005 fiscal year.

== Current events ==
On October 18, 2024, Suriname became the most recent and 175th borrowing member of the IDA. Subsequently, the World Bank Group approved $22.2 million for The Suriname Preparedness and Enhancing Resilient Communities Project. This project is intended to provide support for flood prevention in and around Suriname's capital Paramaribo, as well as the communities of Saramacca and Wanica.

In September 2025, World Bank President Ajay Banga indicated he would be interested in allowing private investors access to securitized risk tranches of loans from the IDA if they could be pooled with those of other development banks, but acknowledged it would be difficult. This is in response to the World Bank offering $500mn in tranches from loans made by the International Finance Corporation to private investors earlier in 2025 to compensate for reduced funding from nations like the UK and US. Banga also noted the IDA still gained $24bn in donor funding during its last round in 2024.

== Governance and operations ==
The IDA is governed by the World Bank's Board of Governors which meets annually and consists of one governor per member country (most often the country's finance minister or treasury secretary). The Board of Governors delegates most of its authority over daily matters such as lending and operations to the Board of Directors. The Board of Directors consists of 25 executive directors and is chaired by the president of the World Bank Group. The executive directors collectively represent all 187 member states of the World Bank, although decisions regarding IDA matters concern only the IDA's 172 member states. The president oversees the IDA's overall direction and daily operations. As of May 2024, Ajay Banga serves as the president of the World Bank Group. The association and IBRD operate with a staff of approximately 10,000 employees.

The IDA is evaluated by the Bank's Independent Evaluation Group. In 2009, the group identified weaknesses in the set of controls used to protect against fraud and corruption in projects supported by IDA lending. In 2011, the group recommended the Bank provide recognition and incentives to staff and management for implementing activities which implement the Paris Declaration on Aid Effectiveness principles of harmonization and alignment, promote greater use of sector-wide approaches to coordination, and explain the reasons why when a country's financial management system is not used so that the client country may address those shortcomings. It also recommended that the Bank collaborate with development partners to strengthen country-level leadership of development assistance coordination by offering greater financial and technical support. Development economists, such as William Easterly, have conducted research which ranked the IDA as featuring the most transparency and best practices among donors of development aid.

Researchers from the Center for Global Development expect that the IDA's collection of eligible borrowing countries will decrease by half by the year 2025 (marking the 65th anniversary of the association's establishment) due to graduations and that remaining borrowers will consist primarily of African countries and will face substantial population declines. These changes will imply a need for the association to carefully examine its financial models and business operations to determine an appropriate strategy going forward. The center recommended that the World Bank leadership begin discussing the long-term future of the IDA.

== Membership ==
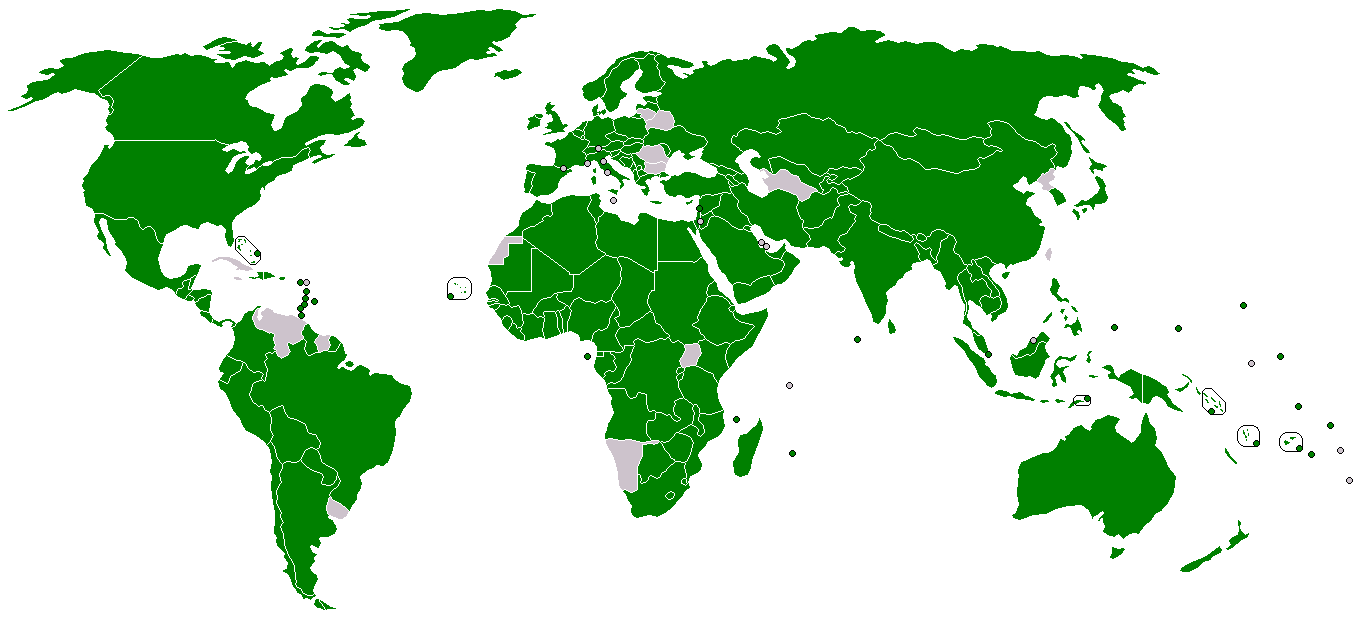
International Development Association member states

The IDA has 173 member countries which pay contributions every three years as replenishments of its capital. On 12 December 2008, Samoa joined UNIDO as its 173rd member. The IDA lends to 75 borrowing countries, over half of which (39) are in Africa. Membership in the IDA is available to only the countries who are members of the World Bank, particularly the IBRD. Throughout its lifetime, 44 borrowing countries have graduated from the association, although 9 of these countries have relapsed as borrowers after not sustaining their graduate status.

To be eligible for support from the IDA, countries are assessed by their poverty and their lack of creditworthiness for commercial and IBRD borrowing. The association assesses countries based on their per capita income, lack of access to private capital markets, and policy performance in implementing pro-growth and anti-poverty economic or social reforms. As of 2019, to borrow from the IDA's concessional lending programs, a country's gross national income (GNI) per capita must not exceed $1,145.

=== IDA borrowing countries ===
The following 75 countries are IDA borrowing countries.

- Afghanistan
- Bangladesh
- Benin
- Bhutan
- Burkina Faso
- Burundi
- Cambodia
- Cameroon
- Cape Verde
- Central African Republic
- Chad
- Comoros
- Democratic Republic of the Congo
- Republic of the Congo
- Djibouti
- Dominica
- Eritrea
- Ethiopia
- Fiji
- Gambia
- Ghana
- Grenada
- Guinea
- Guinea-Bissau
- Guyana
- Haiti
- Honduras
- Ivory Coast
- Kenya
- Kiribati
- Kosovo
- Kyrgyzstan
- Laos
- Lesotho
- Liberia
- Madagascar
- Malawi
- Maldives
- Mali
- Marshall Islands
- Mauritania
- Micronesia
- Mozambique
- Myanmar
- Nepal
- Nicaragua
- Niger
- Nigeria
- Pakistan
- Papua New Guinea
- Rwanda
- Saint Lucia
- Saint Vincent and the Grenadines
- Samoa
- São Tomé and Príncipe
- Senegal
- Sierra Leone
- Solomon Islands
- Somalia
- South Sudan
- Sri Lanka
- Sudan
- Syria
- Tajikistan
- Tanzania
- Timor-Leste
- Togo
- Tonga
- Tuvalu
- Uganda
- Uzbekistan
- Vanuatu
- Yemen
- Zambia
- Zimbabwe

=== Countries that graduated from IDA lending ===
The following countries have graduated from their eligibility for IDA lending.

- Albania (2008)
- Armenia (2014)
- Azerbaijan (2011)
- Botswana (1974)
- Chile (1961)
- China (1999)
- Colombia (1962)
- Costa Rica (1962)
- Dominican Republic (1973)
- Ecuador (1974)
- Egypt (1999) - graduated in FY 81, relapsed in FY 91, graduated again in FY 99
- El Salvador (1977)
- Equatorial Guinea (1999)
- India (2014)
- Indonesia (2008) - graduated in FY 80, relapsed in FY 98, 99, graduated in FY 08
- Jordan (1978)
- Mauritius (1975)
- Montenegro (2008)
- Morocco (1975)
- North Macedonia (2002)
- Paraguay (1977)
- Philippines (1993) - graduated in FY 79, relapsed in FY 91, graduated in FY 93
- Saint Kitts and Nevis (1994)
- Serbia (2007)
- South Korea (1973)
- Swaziland (1975)
- Thailand (1979)
- Tunisia (1977)
- Turkey (1974)

=== Countries relapsed to IDA lending ===
The following countries have relapsed to their eligibility for IDA lending and have not yet re-graduated or have instead become partially eligible (also referred to as a blend country).

- Cameroon (1994)
- Congo (1994)
- Honduras (1991)
- Ivory Coast (1992)
- Nicaragua (1991)
- Nigeria (1989)
- Papua New Guinea (2003, partially eligible)
- Syria (2017)
- Zimbabwe (1992)

== Replenishment rounds ==
The IDA is a unique part of the World Bank as it requires continuous replenishment of its resources. Member countries replenish its funds through contributions in addition to supplementary funds provided by the International Bank for Reconstruction and Development and the International Finance Corporation (IFC). Whereas the IBRD acquires most of its funds by raising capital on international financial markets, the IDA heavily depends on contributions from its member states. The IDA received 2 billion in special drawing rights ($3 billion USD) from the IBRD and IFC.

Approximately half of the IDA's resources come from the 45 donating member countries. In its early years, the IDA received most of its replenishments from the United Kingdom and United States but, because they were not always reliable sources of funding, other developed nations began to step in and fill the economic gaps not met by these two countries. Every three years, member nations that provide funds to the IDA gather together to replenish the IDA's resources. These funds come primarily from well-developed countries including the United States, Japan, France, Germany, and the United Kingdom with 58% from the US, 22% from France, and 8% from the UK. As of 2025, there have been 21 IDA replenishment rounds. Fifty-one member countries participated in the IDA's 16th replenishment of US$49.3 billion. The IDA's loans and grants are usually not paid in full to the borrower at the outset, but rather disbursed incrementally as needed by the project. Most of the donor countries such as the United States commit letters of credit to the IDA which bear no interest and are not able to be transferred or revoked, and which are exchanged for cash as needed for project disbursal. Other countries pay their contributions in full on the date of commitment to the IDA so that it may cover its operating expenses. Donors receive no return of funds and repayments from borrowers are again loaned to future projects.

Although the IDA's funds are now regularly replenished, this does not happen without some financial and political challenges for the donating countries. When donor countries convene to negotiate the replenishments, there is often intense discussion about redefining the association's goals and objectives or IDA reform. Due to delays in the United States Congress impeding the approval of IDA funding, the association's members implemented a set of policy triggers outlining the commitment threshold necessary for replenishment to take effect. The threshold imposed a requirement that an aggregate share of 85% in voting stock is necessary for executing a replenishment. The threshold was implemented with the aim to compel the United States to participate in replenishment rounds. Though countries intended for the triggers to hold the United States to its commitments, the threshold ultimately provided the United States a de facto veto power over replenishment and capital increase negotiations due to its ability to bring replenishment negotiations to an impasse by threatening to withhold support. The U.S. has used this influence to further its long-term foreign policy objectives and short-term political and economic goals by imposing conditionality on replenishment negotiations.

== Lending ==
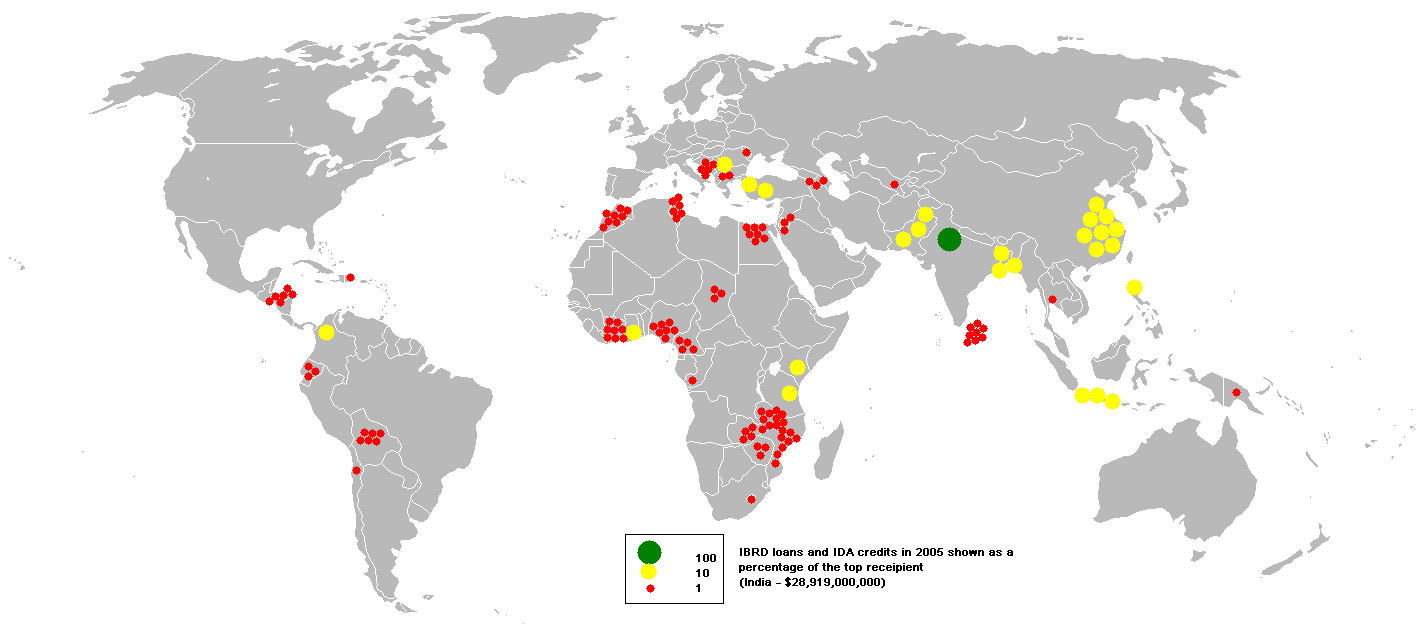
IBRD loans and IDA credits in 2005

The IDA lends to countries with the aim to finance projects that will develop infrastructure and improve education, healthcare, access to clean water and sanitation facilities, and environmental responsibility. It is considered to be the soft lending window of the World Bank, while the IBRD is considered to be the hard lending window. The association offers grants and loans with maturities ranging from 25 to 40 years, grace periods of 5 to 10 years, and interest rates of 2.8% or 1.25% depending on whether the borrower is a blend country – a country also eligible for IBRD loans – and to which degree it is eligible. Regular IDA-eligible borrowers may take advantage of no-interest loans. Financial resources are allocated to eligible countries based on their success at implementing pro-growth and a poverty-reducing domestic policies. The IDA uses the World Bank's Country Policy and Institutional Assessment (CPIA) development indicator to determine each country's place in a resource allocation index. It then prioritizes its lending to those countries which are indicated to be most promising in terms of favorable policies and aid effectiveness. The IDA adopted the Crisis Response Window in 2007 to enable the rapid provision of emergency financing in response to crises. The association adopted the Immediate Response Mechanism in 2011 to provide IDA borrowers with immediate access to withdraw undisbursed portions of their loans, should a crisis arise that meets the mechanism's criteria.

=== Africa ===
Because African countries face some of the most severe poverty and underdevelopment, and because 39 of those countries are the IDA's poorest member states, the association allocates approximately half of the IDA's resources toward financing projects in those countries. As of 2012, its efforts to improve the region, the IDA has helped bring electricity to an additional 66 million Africans since 1997, helped build or restore 240,000 kilometers of paved roads, and helped enroll an additional 15 million African children in school since 2002. The IDA was approved in May 2012 to provide US$50 million worth of credit to the Women Entrepreneur Development Project as part of an effort to help women in South Africa participate in business as skilled employees or leaders. Although the positive outcomes of the IDA's efforts in Africa had been historically slow, the large allocation of funding to African countries led to positive outcomes particularly within agriculture and infrastructure development efforts.

=== Asia ===
The IDA's efforts in Asia have been particularly successful. Numerous Asian countries have graduated from the IDA lending program, including the Philippines, China, South Korea, Thailand, and India. Of the association's borrowing countries, approximately 20 are in Asia. The association's efforts in South Asia have focused primarily on projects for education, healthcare, transportation, agriculture, and energy. Due to rapid growth in Asian countries' populations, some pockets of poverty have emerged. To mitigate this effect, the IDA adopted an economic plan of action which established organizations to improve education and healthcare, with a focus on reducing poverty across Asian nations in ways that are compatible with local culture.

== See also ==
- Bretton Woods system
- United Nations Development Programme
