= Project-Level Aid Database =

The Project-Level Aid (PLAID) database has now become AidData: Tracking Development Finance, a portal for information on development finance. As AidData, it now contains records of over 900,000 international development projects financed by bilateral and multilateral donors from 1950 to 2010. Up until the official launch of AidData in March 2010, the PLAID database was the primary output of PLAID, a research partnership between the Institute for Theory and Practice of International Relations at the College of William and Mary, and the Political Economy and Development Lab at Brigham Young University. It was begun in 2003 to build upon the existing work of the OECD's Creditor Reporting System. In August 2009, PLAID merged with the Development Gateway's Accessible Information on Development Activities Database to form AidData. The beta version of the AidData portal was launched in March 2010, and continues to be accessible to the public.

- AidData: Tracking Development Finance
