= DAC Network on Development Evaluation =

The DAC Network on Development Evaluation is a subsidiary body of the Development Assistance Committee (DAC). Its purpose is to increase the effectiveness of international development programmes by supporting robust, informed and independent evaluation.

The Network brings together evaluation managers and specialists from OECD development cooperation agencies and multilateral development institutions. Members include evaluation departments in the development co-operation agencies of all 33 DAC members, as well as the evaluation units of eight multilateral development banks and institutions.

== Function ==
The DAC Evaluation Network develops guidance and standards for practical application and promotes joint work among donor agencies and partners. The OECD-DAC evaluation criteria, revised in 2019 to include the new criterion of coherence, provide a framework for assessing international development and humanitarian projects. The Network also hosts the DAC Evaluation Resource Centre (DEReC), a user-friendly online database containing a significant number of evaluation reports by all major bilateral donors and seven multilateral institutions. Its work is supported by a secretariat, housed in the Development Co-operation Directorate of the OECD in Paris, France.

The aims and objectives of the Network are:

- To improve evaluation policy and delivery by sharing good practice and by collaborating on joint studies, reports and guidance documents;
- To improve aid effectiveness by supporting the development of operational and policy lessons;
- To facilitate collaboration on joint and multi-donor evaluations and synthesis studies;
- To enhance evaluation capacity development in developing countries for increased transparency, accountability and development effectiveness;
- To help the evaluation community, make a vital contribution to development outcomes.
