= Addis Ababa Action Agenda =

2015 United Nations agreement

The Addis Ababa Action Agenda was the outcome of the 2015 Third International Conference on Financing for Development, held in Addis Ababa, Ethiopia. It was adopted by heads of state and government on 15 July 2015. 174 United Nations member states sent delegations; 28 heads of State, vice presidents and heads of government attended. Governments were joined by the heads of the United Nations, the International Monetary Fund (IMF), the World Bank and the World Trade Organization (WTO), prominent business and civil society leaders, and other stakeholders. The agreement is a follow-up to the 2002 Monterrey Consensus and the 2008 Doha Declaration on Financing for Development.

== Structure ==
The Addis Agenda is a global framework that seeks to align financing flows and policies with economic, social, and environmental priorities. Expanding on the previous Financing for Development outcomes, the document includes seven Action Areas:

- Domestic public resources
- Domestic and international private business and finance
- International development cooperation
- International trade as an engine for development
- Debt and debt sustainability
- Addressing systemic issues
- Science, technology, innovation, and capacity building

== Relation to the 2030 Agenda for Sustainable Development ==
The negotiation of the Addis Agenda witnessed significant debate over the agreement's relationship to the 2030 Agenda for Sustainable Development. Previous Financing for Development outcomes, such as the Monterrey Consensus, had no formal links to United Nations Millennium Development Goals. Many countries wanted to ensure that the Financing for Development process continued as a stand-alone process, while others thought that the two should be harmonized. In the end, countries agreed that the processes would continue in parallel, with formal links.

The Addis Agenda was adopted three months ahead of the 2030 Agenda. It specifically states that one of the tasks of the conference was "to further strengthen the framework to finance sustainable development and the means of implementation for the universal post-2015 development agenda". The 2030 Agenda states "The Addis Ababa Action Agenda supports, complements, and helps contextualize the 2030 Agenda’s means of implementation targets."

== Implementation ==
The Addis Agenda entered implementation in 2016. Because the Addis Agenda contains national and international commitments, implementation is a complex endeavor. The Addis Agenda strengthens the follow-up process, including an annual ECOSOC Forum on Financing for Development and the creation of an Inter-agency Task Force on Financing for Development, which reports annually on progress and the means of implementation of the 2030 Agenda for Sustainable Development.

The Inter-agency Task Force on Financing for Development was convened in late 2015 and is coordinated by the United Nations Department of Economic and Social Affairs. The World Bank Group, International Monetary Fund, World Trade Organization, United Nations Conference on Trade and Development (UNCTAD), and the United Nations Development Programme (UNDP), are the major institutional stakeholders of the Financing for Development process. With DESA they play a coordinating role for the Task Force.

The ECOSOC Forum on Financing for Development is convened annually. It encompasses the high-level dialogue of ECOSOC with the Bretton Woods institutions and the World Trade Organization. It is mandated to review the implementation of the Addis Agenda as well as "means of implementation" targets of the Sustainable Development Goals (SDGs). The 2030 Agenda on Sustainable Development mandates that agreed conclusions and recommendations of the Forum "will be fed into the overall follow-up and review of the implementation of this Agenda in the High-Level Political Forum".
