= Development Assistance Committee =

OECD committee

Development Assistance Committee DAC Map

The Organisation for Economic Co-operation and Development's (OECD) Development Assistance Committee (DAC) is a forum to discuss issues surrounding aid, development and poverty reduction in developing countries. It describes itself as being the "venue and voice" of the world's major donor countries.

The Development Co-operation Directorate (DCD) is the Secretariat of the DAC and is the OECD Directorate within which the DAC operates.

== Members ==
As of September 2025, Development Assistance Committee consists of:

- 33 members (incl. the European Union as a full member),
- one associate – non-OECD Members that are invited to participate in all meetings of the Committee and its subsidiary bodies and take part in its decision-making process (except on the accession of OECD Members to the DAC),
- seven participants – non-OECD countries authorized to participate in the meetings,
- eight observers – international organizations authorized to participate in the meetings.

Members:

- Australia
- Austria
- Belgium
- Canada
- Czech Republic
- Denmark
- Estonia
- European Union
- Finland
- France
- Germany
- Greece
- Hungary
- Iceland
- Ireland
- Italy
- Japan
- Latvia
- Lithuania
- Luxembourg
- Netherlands
- New Zealand
- Norway
- Poland
- Portugal
- Slovakia
- Slovenia
- South Korea
- Spain
- Sweden
- Switzerland
- United Kingdom
- United States

Associates:

- Romania

Participants:

- Azerbaijan
- Bulgaria
- Croatia
- Kuwait
- Qatar
- Saudi Arabia
- United Arab Emirates

Observers:

- African Development Bank
- Asian Development Bank
- European Investment Bank
- Inter-American Development Bank
- International Monetary Fund
- United Nations Development Programme
- World Bank
- World Health Organization

== History ==
Known at first as the Development Assistance Group (DAG), the committee was set up on 13 January 1960 under the auspices of the OECD's forerunner, the Organisation for European Economic Co-operation (OEEC). Its first meeting took place in Washington, D.C. (U.S.) on 9–11 March 1960, chaired by ambassador Ortona, Italy. A primary concern of the DAG, addressed at its second (July 1960) and third (October 1960) meetings, was to achieve accurate and comparable data reporting by its members on their aid flows to developing countries. In March 1961, the OEEC published the first comprehensive survey of The Flow of Financial Resources to Countries in Course of Economic Development, 1956–59. This was followed by annual reports until 1964.

On 23 July 1961 a Ministerial Resolution decreed that upon the supersession of the OEEC by the OECD, the DAG would become the DAC, and these changes came about in September 1961. The resolution also spelled out the DAC's mandate in five points, the first of which read:

The Committee will continue to consult on the methods for making national resources available for assisting countries and areas in the process of economic development and for expanding and improving the flow of long-term funds and other development assistance to them.

— Development Assistance Committee, Mandate (1961)

The origins of the so-called "DAC Secretariat" or DCD are as follows. A Development Department (DD), under the direction of Assistant Secretary-General Luciano Giretti of Italy was established within the OECD Secretariat in 1961. It consisted of two branches, a Technical Co-operation Branch and a Development Financial Branch. The latter became the Development Assistance Directorate (DAD) in 1969 and then the Development Co-operation Directorate (DCD) in 1975.

Along with the institution of the DAG/DAC, several developments in the early 1960s completed the institutional framework for aid that is still largely in place. In 1960, the World Bank opened a subsidiary, the International Development Association (IDA) to provide loans to developing countries on easier terms than the Bank's normal lending. The aid agencies of the large donor states were also set up at this time.

Canada created an "External Aid Office" in 1960, which in 1968 became the Canadian International Development Agency (CIDA). France was the first country to establish a Ministry for Co-operation to be responsible for assistance to independent, mainly African, developing countries in 1961, the predecessor to the French Development Agency, Agence Française de Développement (AFD). Enactment in the United States in 1961 of the Foreign Assistance Act as the basic economic assistance legislation, established the United States Agency for International Development (USAID).

Later the rest of the member states followed, either establishing an aid agency under the command of its Foreign ministry or as a separate entity.

== Functions ==
The work of the committee concentrates on

- how international development cooperation contributes to the capacity of developing countries to participate in the global economy, and
- the capacity of people to overcome poverty and participate fully in their societies.

To this end, the committee holds regular High Level Meetings and Senior Level Meetings where the ministers or heads of the national aid agencies and other development partners meet to discuss issues related to development and adopt recommendations and resolutions.

The member states are expected to have certain common objectives concerning the conduct of their aid programmes. The committee therefore issues guidelines on the management of development aid. It also publishes a wide range of reports, among them the annual Development Co-operation Report. In addition, as member states recognise the need for greater coherence in policies across sectors that affect developing countries, an OECD-wide initiative on Policy Coherence for Development explores ways to ensure that government policies are mutually supportive of the countries' development goals.

The subsidiary bodies of DAC are:

- DAC Network on Development Evaluation, to increase the effectiveness of international development programmes.
- Working Party on Development Finance Statistics
- Network on Development Evaluation (EVALNET)
- (GENDERNET)
- Network on Environment and Development Co-operation (ENVIRONET)
- Network on Governance (GOVNET)
- International Network on Conflict and Fragility (INCAF)
- Advisory Group on Investment and Development (AGID), a joint subsidiary body with the OECD's Investment Committee

DAC also hosts communities of practice on various topics, including civil society, private finance for development, and poverty reduction.

Since March 2023, its Chair is Mr. Carsten Staur, former Danish Ambassador to the OECD and UNESCO.

== Achievements ==
As already noted, the DAC is a forum for the coordination of aid efforts. One of the principal questions that has emerged over the years was how to ensure that its member states contributed equal shares of development aid. In the early 1960s, some member states contributed a significantly larger share of their GNP than others. To encourage that the aid effort was equally divided, the DAC quickly recognized the United Nations Conference on Trade and Development recommendation on having an International Aid Target, proposed in 1964. The issue of the aid burden-sharing eventually led to the first report on "Total Official Contributions as Per Cent of National Income" in 1967, something that was accompanied by closely negotiated explanations.

Another early question was what a donor could include when it reported its aid efforts to the committee. It was necessary to make the distinction between official transactions that were made with the main objective of promoting the economic and social development of developing countries, as opposed to other official flows (OOF) like military assistance. To that end, the committee adopted the concept of Official Development Assistance (ODA) in 1969. The DAC revised the definition in 1972, which has remained unchanged since then, except for changes in the list of recipients for which it can be counted.

=== 2000s ===
At the DAC High Level Meeting in May 2000, members agreed to untie their aid (with the exception of technical cooperation and food aid) from January 2001 onwards to the Least Developed Countries and to promote buying goods and services locally in these countries, rather than in donor countries. This agreement was extended in 2008 to 39 highly indebted poor countries (HIPCs). As a consequence, in 2008 80% of total ODA (minus administrative costs) was provided untied, 4% tied and of 16% the tying status was not reported.

A 2009 independent evaluation of DAC members' policies and practices towards untying by the Danish Institute for International Studies concluded that on the basis of the available information, the overall picture was positive. The report recommended more frequent and transparent reporting by donor countries on the status of tied aid to the OECD and DAC, removal of obstacles to untying on the donor side, and initiatives to encourage competition for aid-supported contracts on the recipient side.

As a forum for and by the bilateral donors, each donor's aid efforts are evaluated in peer reviews where major findings and recommendations are presented. Each DAC member country is reviewed roughly once every five years.

More recently, the DAC has been involved in questions related to aid effectiveness. At the DAC High Level Meeting in April 2005, participants adopted the Paris Declaration on Aid Effectiveness. Progress in implementing the Paris Declaration commitments was reviewed at the third High Level Forum on Aid Effectiveness in September 2008 in Accra Ghana, an event co-ordinated by the DAC's Working Party on Aid Effectiveness, the government of Ghana and the World Bank. The International Health Partnership (IHP+) was created in 2007 in order to put the Paris and Accra principles on aid effectiveness into practice. At the Fourth High Level Forum on Aid Effectiveness, held in Busan, Korea in 2011, participants endorsed the "Busan Partnership for Effective Development Co-operation," which expanded on the Paris Declaration and established the Global Partnership for Effective Development Co-operation. In April 2014, the Global Partnership -- for which the OECD and UNDP assure a joint support team -- held its first High Level Meeting in Mexico City. UNCTAD has noted that, since the turn of the century, DAC has become one of the dominant institutions with regards to development aid.

The Center for Global Development, a non-profit think-tank in Washington DC, created the Commitment to Development Index which ranks and evaluates the achievements of DAC countries to the developing world. It measures the "development-friendliness" of the donor nations, moving beyond standard comparisons of Official Development Assistance. The Index quantifies a wide range of policies on seven indicators: aid, trade, investment, migration, environment, security, and technology. In 2009, Sweden and Denmark received the highest rankings, while Japan and South Korea fell toward the bottom.

In 2010, South Korea became the first major recipient of ODA from the OECD to turn into a major donor when it became a DAC member. In 2013, the country provided over $1.7 billion in aid.

The European Union accumulated a higher portion of GDP as a form of foreign aid than any other economic union.

The DAC’s 2020 communiqué notes by members’ efforts in responding to the COVID-19. For civil society organizations, “the OECD-DAC continues its narrative of leveraging the private sector, with only some mention of safeguards in private sector involvement”.

== Statistics ==
Since its inception, one of the DAC's main functions has been to collect and publish statistics on aid flow. As noted in the Achievements section of this article, in 1969 the DAC's members adopted a criterion for calculating their aid contributions. They called the resulting measure of aid contributions Official Development Assistance (ODA). It has become widely used by other organisations, and scholars, as a general measure of aid; for example, the United Nations and the World Bank both commonly use ODA as calculated by the DAC as their measure of aid. This is in spite of the fact that it is not an entirely comprehensive measure. It includes only aid from government sources; aid from private sources, including NGOs, is not counted. About ten to fifteen percent of aid comes from private sources.

ODA includes developmental and humanitarian aid, the latter being much the smaller of the two. It does not include aid for military use. It includes both outright grants and loans, as long as the loans are on significantly easier terms than the commercial norm: the DAC calls these "concessional" loans. The change to the definition of ODA in 1972 involved tightening the definition of "concessionality". The DAC defines concessionality according to a mathematically computed "grant element"; loans with a grant element of at least 25 percent are considered concessional and count as ODA. This criterion has not been changed since 1972.

Loans made in a given year that are counted towards ODA are counted net of repayments made that year on the principal of old loans, but not net of interest payments. Therefore, after a loan has been paid back its overall effect on ODA figures is zero (Its overall direct fiscal effect on the recipient is of course that the recipient has had to pay back some amount of interest).

Debt forgiveness is counted explicitly as a category of ODA.

The DAC computes ODA from data submitted by its member states. It also has collected some data from its participants and observers, which are often significant: in fact their donations are roughly in line with that of the DAC countries' as a fraction of donor gross national income as can be seen in the List of development aid country donors.

Only aid to countries on the DAC List of ODA Recipients counts as ODA. Initially it included most developing countries. After the fall of Communism in Europe in the early 1990s, the Eastern European countries and the Soviet Union, which had formerly been donors of aid, became aid recipients, albeit wealthier ones than most developing countries. Because of this and because some formerly poor East Asian countries were now middle-income, the DAC in 1993 divided the list of recipients into two parts, on the basis of national income. Only aid to countries in the lower income part (Part I) counted as ODA. Aid to countries in the upper income part was put into a new category called Official Assistance (OA), separate from ODA. This bifurcated list was abolished in 2005, however, because of the confusion and accounting difficulties that were occasioned when countries moved from one part to the other of the list. The current list (2007) includes all countries with per capita GNI less than $11 455, except that it excludes countries that are members of the G8, or the EU, or that have a firm accession date for EU membership. Movement of countries on or off the list has caused the DAC to retroactively change past ODA figures for some group categories.

Besides ODA, the DAC keeps statistics on three other major categories:

- Other Official Flows (OOF) are transactions by the official sector (not private) that are not "development-motivated" or not concessional. The main items in OOF are export credits, official sector equity and portfolio investment, and debt reorganisation.
- Private Flows consists mostly of investment by transnational corporations and private banks, and export credits given by industries. The figures for Private Flows and OOF are quite volatile from year to year because they represent a balance between positive and negative flows.
- Net Private Grant. This is mostly aid from private sources such as NGOs.

== List of former DAC Chairs ==
- 2019 Susanna Moorehead, UK
- 2016 Charlotte Petri Gornitzka, Sweden
- 2013 Erik Solheim, Norway
- 2010 J. Brian Atwood, USA
- 2008 Eckhard Deutscher, Germany
- 2003 Richard G. Manning, UK
- 1999 Jean-Claude Faure, France
- 1994 James H. Michel
- 1991 Alexander R. Love
- 1986 Joseph C. Wheeler
- 1982 Rutherford M. Poats
- 1979 John P. Lewis
- 1974 Maurice J. Williams
- 1967 Edwin M. Martin
- 1963 Willard L. Thorp
- 1961 James W. Riddleberger

== See also ==
- Aid effectiveness
- Aid for Trade
- Developed country
- Development
- Development aid
- International Health Partnership
- List of country groupings
- List of development aid agencies
- List of multilateral free-trade agreements
- Official development assistance
- Paris Declaration on Aid Effectiveness
- PARIS21
- Right to development
