= International Development Markup Language =

The International Development Markup Language (IDML) is an XML-based standard for the exchange of information on aid activities. It is used by a number of donors to provide information to the AidData database of development finance.

IDML was developed from 1998 onwards, building on a previous text-file format for exchanging development information, CEFDA (Common Format for Exchange of Development Information).

Ideas from IDML were also fed into the development of the XML format used in the International Aid Transparency Initiative (IATI).

== Further Information ==
IDML Initiative website with archive of resources from the standards development.
