= Synergy International Systems =

American information technology company

Synergy International Systems, Inc.
- Company type: Private
- Industry: Computer software
- Founded: 1997; 29 years ago
- Headquarters: Virginia, United States
- Area served: Worldwide
- Products: Synergy Indicata: M&E Software; Case Management System (CMS); Development Assistance Database (DAD); Social Protection Information System (SPIS)
- Number of employees: 220 (2015)
- Website: www.synisys.com

Synergy International Systems (SIS) is an American information technology and consulting company that provides web-based software to international development agencies, country governments, NGOs and private sector partners. Their key products are focused on monitoring and evaluation (M&E), national development effectiveness, aid management, judicial system modernization, social protection, public financial management, disaster relief and reconstruction, environment, education, and public health.

The company is based in Washington, D.C. and they maintain is a global learning center in Yerevan, Armenia. The company's services include software development and customization, IT strategy consulting, systems integration, capacity development and technical support. Synergy has developed management information systems for public and private sector clients in 65 countries.

== History ==
The company was founded in Washington, D.C. in 1997. It is incorporated under the laws of the commonwealth of Virginia in the United States. Synergy's first product was a PC system – donor assistance database, developed in the scope of the G7 support implementation group project in 1996, to monitor aid assistance donated from the international community.

The PC system was developed for the Russian Federation in 1996. The system, later on, was developed for the newly independent states of the former Soviet Union, including Armenia, Georgia, Kazakhstan, Kyrgyzstan, Turkmenistan, Ukraine, and Tajikistan.

The company's global learning center in Yerevan, Armenia was opened in 1999. Synergy currently employs around 200 highly professional staff in the areas of software development, systems analysis, systems integration, network administration, quality assurance, and business analysis.

== Clients ==
The overall clients include international government ministries and development partners, with a geographical coverage that includes countries in Africa, Asia-Pacific, Australia, the Caribbean, Central America, Europe, and the Middle East.

Synergy's clients also include such international organizations as the Asian Development Bank (ADB); the Global Fund to Fight AIDS, Tuberculosis and Malaria; German Development Cooperation, the Inter-American Development Bank, the Millennium Challenge Corporation, the Organisation of Eastern Caribbean States, the United Nations Development Programme, the United Nations Office for Project Services, the United States Agency for International Development, the United States Department of State (DOS), and the World Bank.

Since 2005, Synergy has been working with the International Aid Transparency Initiative (IATI) as a member of the IATI technical advisory group, aligning its aid information management solutions with the international protocols and principles of aid transparency.

== See also ==
- Development Assistance Database (DAD)
- International development
