= Publish What You Fund =

Publish What You Fund is a UK-based lobbying group that promotes aid transparency (more and better information about aid) as a way to improve aid effectiveness. It publishes an aid transparency index that scores countries and organisations based on the information they share about funding aid programs. It was established in 2008 by Judith Olson. It started publishing its aid transparency index in 2011.

== See also ==
- Aid
- Aid effectiveness
- International Aid Transparency Initiative
