= UHC2030 =

International health partnership

UHC2030, formerly known as the International Health Partnership (IHP+), is a global platform which aims to promote universal health coverage (UHC). The global platform is co-hosted by the World Health Organization, the World Bank and the OECD.

IHP+ began in September 2007 as an international partnership aiming to improve health cooperation to accelerate progress towards the Millennium Development Goals. The initiative arose from pre-existing developments aimed at improving health outcomes and improving aid effectiveness, including the High-level Forum (HLF) on the Health MDGs, the post-HLF process, and the HLF on Aid Effectiveness, in line with the Paris Declaration on Aid Effectiveness and later on the Busan Partnership Agreement for effective development cooperation.
