= Development Gateway =

International non-profit organization

- Formation: 1999; 27 years ago
- Founder: James Wolfensohn
- Purpose: Information technology, aid effectiveness, good governance
- Headquarters: Washington, D.C.
- Region served: Worldwide
- Method: Project-specific funding
- CEO: Josh Powell
- Website: developmentgateway.org
- Formerly called: Development Gateway Foundation

Development Gateway, Inc. (abbreviated as DG) is an international non-profit organization that provides technical tools and advisory services to country governments and development organizations.

Formerly known as the Development Gateway Foundation, DG was founded in 1999 by World Bank President James Wolfensohn, and spun off as an independent organization in 2000. It was one of several World Bank global knowledge initiatives at that time, and its focus on the potential of internet and communications technologies for development was closely aligned with Wolfensohn's thinking. In the years after it became an independent organization, DG received core funding from the World Bank, as well as from country governments and other stakeholders. In the early 2010s, it transitioned into a primarily project-funded organization, with limited grant or in-kind funding.

In the late 2010s, through partnerships with foundations including the Bill and Melinda Gates Foundation, Hewlett Foundation, and Ford Foundation, DG launched a number of multi-country programs focused on improving data use in Africa in sectors including open contracting and agriculture.

DG offers expertise in the areas of data use, fiscal transparency, and data policy, serving governments, development partners, and other non-governmental organizations.

In October 2021, Development Gateway formed a strategic partnership with IREX that positioned DG as a subsidiary of IREX. Since then, DG has been known as “Development Gateway, an IREX Venture.”

== Aid Management Program ==
The Aid Management Program (AMP) combines online software with institutional strengthening activities to help developing country governments that receive official development assistance (ODA) build capacity for aid information management. There are two primary components to the program: 1) aid information management systems including the Aid Management Platform and ODAdata and 2) institutional strengthening activities.

The program was first presented at the 2005 High-Level Forum on Aid Effectiveness in Paris and has since been implemented in 22 countries with funding from UNDP, the World Bank, and governments. Countries use AMP to monitor the implementation and execution of development aid projects, coordinate development strategies with donors, and produce ODA and budget reports. The system offers an optional interactive mapping module provided by Esri. Development Gateway hosts an annual conference, known as the AMP Best Practices Workshop, to enable governments in the program to exchange experiences and advice.

== Legacy programs ==
- The Country Gateways program was one of DG's first initiatives and sought to replicate the international Development Gateway model at the country level. With seed funding from Development Gateway, about 50 countries – including China, Morocco, Burkina Faso, Vietnam, and others – have established independent Country Gateway entities. Each of these organizations is loosely modeled after Development Gateway, but each has distinct objectives. Some Country Gateways publish procurement notices for government contracts, databases of development projects, directories of non-governmental organizations, and e-commerce tools. Offline services include consulting and training in ICT.
- Zunia was an online platform for knowledge exchange and networking among development practitioners. Zunia aggregated publications, posts, and articles from international development organizations, websites, and blogs; Zunia also aggregated job listings in the international development field from other sites. Zunia users could post development-related content, comment on other content, subscribe to custom email alerts, and create or join thematic discussion groups. In 2009, the platform replaced dgCommunities, an earlier version of Development Gateway's knowledge-sharing platform; it was retired in 2016.
- AidData was a joint project of the College of William and Mary, Brigham Young University, and Development Gateway, designed to make information on development finance and activities more transparent and accessible. Launched in 2010, AidData maintains a searchable database of development assistance and through partnerships has engaged in research projects on data collection and augmentation through crowdsourcing and other methods as well as more traditional research on aid allocation and effectiveness. AidData has also worked to geocode development assistance data. Jointly with Uppsala University's Uppsala Conflict Data Program (UCDP), AidData developed a geocoding methodology for aid information, worked with the World Bank on the Mapping for Results initiative, and collaborated with Esri on the Development Loop application.
- dgMarket is an online marketplace for government tenders, providing access to tender notices, contract awards, bidding documents, and other procurement information. dgMarket provides access to government tenders in 60 countries and aid-funded tenders in 150 countries. Branded dgMarket Web sites have been launched in Estonia, Belarus, China, Côte d'Ivoire, Israel, Kenya, Mauritania, Mexico, Romania, Rwanda, Spain (Catalonia), Turkey, Uzbekistan, and Vietnam, as well as for the Agence Française de Développement and the Millennium Challenge Corporation. In early 2017, Development Gateway sold Market to Nepalese-Canadian entrepreneur Aditya Jha.
