= International Aid Transparency Initiative =

Campaign for transparency in aid money spending

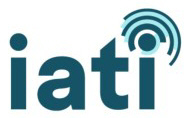
Logo

The International Aid Transparency Initiative (IATI) is a global campaign to create transparency in the records of how aid money is spent. The initiative hopes to thereby ensure that aid money reaches its intended recipients. The ultimate goal is to improve standards of living worldwide and globally reduce poverty. The IATI also publishes a standard to be used by organizations, allowing different datasets to be combined and shared.

== History ==
The initiative was launched on September 4, 2008, at the Third High Level Forum on Aid Effectiveness held in Accra, Ghana. The goal of the forum was to refocus attention worldwide on the steps needed to reach the United Nations' Millennium Development Goals. It was presented by the United Kingdom's Secretary of International Development Douglas Alexander; along with Kemal Derviş, Head of the United Nations Development Programme; James Musconi, the Rwandan finance minister; and Kumi Naidoo, then president of CIVICUS. Alexander recommended creating a common set of openness standards by which donors can be judged. 14 international donors pledged to expand transparency as a result, and an agreement was reached to develop a common format for the release of aid information by 2010. A statement was issued by the signatories, which formally accepted the policies set forth in the Accra Agenda for Action and agreed to form the IATI. The text of the statement suggests that aid donors should:

- "publicly disclose regular, detailed and timely information on volume, allocation and when, available, results of development expenditure to enable more accurate budget, accounting and audit by developing countries"
- "support information systems for managing aid"
- "provide full and timely information on annual commitments and actual disbursements"

The statement was agreed to by a variety of international donors, including the Ministry for Foreign Affairs of Finland, Irish Aid, the World Bank, the UK's Department for International Development, the United Nations Development Program, and the William and Flora Hewlett Foundation.

After a period of widespread engagement of donors, governments, and NGOs and consultation on the information to be shared and how it should be shared, the IATI Standard was agreed on 9 February 2011 in Paris.

At the Fourth High Level Forum on Aid Effectiveness, held in Busan, Korea in November 2011, the initiative received continued support. In the run up to the forum, over 19 donors, including 12 government and multilateral donors, and a number of small NGOs, started publishing information on their aid projects using the IATI Standard .

In October 2013, the IATI received a significant support when the Bill & Melinda Gates Foundation announced that it would join the initiative.

Further support came from the workstream for greater transparency of the Grand Bargain (humanitarian reform) in 2016. In this workstream, aid organisations and donors committed to "publish timely, transparent, harmonised and open high-quality data on humanitarian funding within two years of the World Humanitarian Summit in Istanbul" and participants in the workstream chose IATI as a common standard for that.

== Make Aid Transparent Campaign ==
On 8 June 2011, the Make Aid Transparent Campaign was launched, supported by over 60 organisations from North and South.

== IATI Standard ==
The IATI Standard combines a list of the information that donors publishing data as part of the Initiative should seek to publish, along with an XML schema and collection of code lists for representing that information as structured open data. Donors publishing data using the standard are encouraged to submit meta-data to the IATI Registry, which lists the available data.

The IATI Standard succeeds two previous standardisation efforts for aid activity information: the Common Exchange Format for Development Activities CEFDA (developed from 1991), and International Development Markup Language IDML (developed from 1998) and used by Development Gateway as part of the data transfer standard in the AidData database.

== IATI Registry ==
As of September 2024, the IATI Registry shows that 1690 organizations have published to the IATI standard. As of December 2015, 47% of European Union aid flows are recorded on IATI.

== Concerns on data quality ==
James Coe, a senior advocacy officer at Publish What You Fund, wrote in August 2016 that there are over 35,000 agriculture-related activities in the IATI Registry, but "only a small number provide the locations of activities and even fewer provide some form of data on the outcome", making the data difficult to use.

A piece in Devex stated that while the number of organizations reporting to IATI has increased, "the biggest barrier to increased data usage remains concerns about quality" of the data.

Efforts by IATI's Governing Board to address the data quality issues include the release of the "IATI Validator" which enables publishers to confirm that their data is accessible and of good quality.

== See also ==
- Aid
- Aid effectiveness
- Transparency International
- United Nations' Millennium Development Goals
