= Conditionality =

Conditions imposed on international benefits

In political economy and international relations, conditionality is the use of conditions attached to the provision of benefits such as a loan, debt relief or bilateral aid. These conditions are typically imposed by international financial institutions or regional organizations and are generally intended to enhance aid effectiveness.

== International financial institutions ==
Conditionality is typically employed by the International Monetary Fund (IMF), the World Bank or a donor country with respect to loans, debt relief and financial aid. Conditionalities may involve relatively uncontroversial requirements to enhance aid effectiveness, such as anti-corruption measures, but they may involve highly controversial ones, such as austerity or the privatization of key public services, which may provoke strong political opposition in the recipient country. These conditionalities are often grouped under the label structural adjustment as they were prominent in the structural adjustment programs following the debt crisis of the 1980s.

== Ex-ante vs. ex-post ==
Much debate in types of conditionality centers around ex-ante versus ex-post conditionality. In ex-post conditionality, the country receiving aid agrees to conditions set by the donor or lender that they will carry out after they receive the aid. Later follow-ups determine whether they might receive more aid. If conditions are not met or other political differences between the donor and recipient materialize, aid may be suspended. Ex-ante conditionality requires a country to meet certain conditions and prove it can maintain them before it will receive any aid.

Traditionally, the IMF lends funds based on ex-post criteria, which might induce moral hazard behavior by the borrowing country. The moral hazard problem appears when a government behaves in a risky manner in the anticipation that it can turn to the IMF in the case of a crisis. Institutional reforms of the IMF, such as the Flexible Credit Line (FCL) in 1999, attempt to reduce moral hazard by relying more on pre-set qualification criteria (i.e. ex-ante).

== 'Tied' aid ==
Other types of conditionality that often occur are aid which is tied to be used in a specific way. For example, many countries tie aid to the purchasing of domestic products, although this practice has drastically decreased over the past 15 years. The United Nations Human Development Report in 2005 estimated that only about 8 per cent of bilateral aid is 'tied', down from 27 per cent in 1990. This, however, varies from country to country, with the United Kingdom, Ireland and Norway giving 100 per cent of their aid untied, and Canada, Austria and Spain giving less than 60 per cent.

== European Union ==
The European Union also employs conditionality with respect to enlargement, with membership conditional on candidate countries meeting the Copenhagen criteria and adopting the acquis communautaire.

== See also ==
- Consideration
- Development aid
- Heavily Indebted Poor Countries
- Structural adjustment
