= Farzana Marie =

American poet and veteran

- Born: Felisa Hervey; California, U.S.
- Education: United States Air Force Academy, University of Arizona
- Occupations: Military veteran, writer, poet, translator
- Employer: United States Air Force
- Awards: Bronze Star Medal

Farzana Marie (born in 1983) is the pen name of Felisa Hervey, an American poet, author, and former United States Air Force officer.

== Early life ==
Hervey was born in California to Episcopal Church missionary parents, Debbie and John Hervey. Felisa and her five siblings lived with their parents in Chile and Kazakhstan before returning to their native California when she was 15.

== Work ==
Hervey joined the United States Air Force Academy in June 2001. Before graduating, she travelled to Afghanistan in 2003 and 2004 to work in an orphanage and learn Dari. After graduation and joining the US Air Force, she spent two years working in Kabul where her fluency in Dari enabled community relations work.

She received a Bronze Star Medal in 2012 after six years of active duty, including two years of deployment to Afghanistan. After her military career, Hervey returned to Kabul to study and later to work for NATO. She worked as an editor and translator, using the pen name Farzana Marie.

Hervey studied for a PhD in Persian literature at the University of Arizona, funded by a Pat Tillman Foundation scholarship. In August 2015, before her PhD was complete, she suffered a stroke in Afghanistan. Aphasia caused her to lose all six languages that she spoke. In May 2019, she graduated with her Ph.D. in Middle Eastern literature.

== Personal life ==
Hervey was aged 30 in 2014, and is Christian.

She lives in Tucson.

== Selected books ==
- Load Poems Like Guns: Women’s Poetry from Herat, Afghanistan, Holy Cow! Press (editor and translator)
- Letters to War and Lethe (author)
- Hearts for Sale! A Buyer’s Guide to Winning in Afghanistan, Worldwide Writings 2013, (author)
