= Development Assistance Database =

The Development Assistance Database (DAD) is an aid information management system (AIMS) developed by Synergy International Systems for tracking development aid and managing official development assistance with transparency and accountability. DAD is a widely adopted AIMS which has been established in more than 35 countries worldwide in close cooperation with UNDP and respective governments.

DAD provides country governments and development partners with a consolidated source of data on development projects across all donors, demonstrates "who is doing what, when and where" in managing foreign aid, enables harmonization of development projects with national priorities, facilitates management and coordination of development efforts in the country by and promotes results-driven decision-making and aid effectiveness.

DAD has served as the official government AIMS in Afghanistan, Armenia, Burundi, Cameroon, Central African Republic, Comoros, Georgia, Ghana, Guatemala, India, Indonesia, Iraq (including Kurdistan Regional Government), Kazakhstan, Kenya, Maldives, Mauritania, Nigeria, Lesotho, Pakistan, Papua New Guinea, Philippines, Russia, Rwanda, Sierra Leone, Sri Lanka, Somalia (including Somaliland), Solomon Islands, Tajikistan, Thailand, Ukraine, Vietnam, Yemen and Zambia.

== History ==
Originally known as the Donor Assistance Database, the DAD was rebranded as the Development Assistance Database on August 2, 2005. The first Donor Assistance Database was a PC system developed in the scope of the G7 Support Implementation Group project for Russia in 1996 to monitor aid assistance donated from the international community. The first Donor Assistance Database tracked 20,000 projects, and over US$100 billion in official development assistance delivered from 1991 to 2001. The DAD was then adapted as a tool for the newly independent states of the former Soviet Union to monitor development assistance from the international community. These first generation implementations include Armenia, Georgia, Kazakhstan, Kyrgyzstan, Turkmenistan, Ukraine, and Tajikistan.

Most of these implementations have taken place through a partnership between the software company Synergy International Systems, and the United Nations Development Programme (UNDP). This partnership led to the signing of a long-term agreement in July, 2005.

== See also ==
- Synergy International Systems
