= Aid effectiveness =

Degree of success or failure of international aid

Aid effectiveness is the degree of success or failure of international aid (development aid or humanitarian aid). Concern with aid effectiveness might be at a high level of generality (whether aid on average fulfils the main functions that aid is supposed to have), or it might be more detailed (considering relative degrees of success between different types of aid in differing circumstances).

Questions of aid effectiveness have been highly contested by academics, commentators and practitioners, and there is a large literature on the subject. Econometric studies in the late 20th century often found the average effectiveness of aid to be minimal or even negative. Such studies have appeared on the whole to yield more affirmative results in the early 21st century, but the picture is complex and far from clear in many respects.

Many prescriptions have been made about how to improve aid effectiveness. In 2003–2011, around four high level forums on aid effectiveness were held to elaborate a set of good practices concerning aid administration co-ordination and relations between donors and recipient countries. The Paris Declaration and other results of these forums embodied a broad consensus on what needed to be done to produce better development results. From 2011 this movement was subsumed in one concerned more broadly with effective development co-operation, largely embodied by the Global Partnership for Effective Development Co-operation.

== Concept ==
Any discussion of "effectiveness" must rely on understandings or assumptions about aims. In public discussions of aid effectiveness, the general aim is usually assumed to be boosting the development of recipient countries and, hence, the well-being of people living in them. But "development" and "well-being" are complex and slippery concepts. The most popular summary indicator for a country's development is probably average national income per head in its population, but this indicator does not capture inequalities of wealth and power, or the structural characteristics of the country's institutions and economy. Since the 1990s the prime purpose of aid has widely been seen as poverty reduction, but this, too, can be interpreted in a variety of ways (How soon? How sustainable? What level?). Such ambiguities should be clarified or at least borne in mind when considering aid effectiveness.

Under the main international definition of aid – official development assistance – any self-seeking motives of aid donors are supposed to be strictly subordinate to the objective of promoting the economic development and welfare of developing countries. Such motives – which may involve strategic alliances, diplomatic trade-offs, commercial advantages and other political benefits – are nowadays usually discussed as obstacles to aid effectiveness rather than alternative aims.

In the first decade of the 20th century, "aid effectiveness" was the declared focus of a movement joined by major donor and recipient countries and aid-related organisations, involving a series of high-level forums on aid effectiveness. The agenda of this movement was largely about good practices in donor-recipient relationships, and in some cases, these good practices became seen as proxies for aid effectiveness.

== History ==
The historical themes of aid effectiveness are rather different for humanitarian aid and developmental aid, so these have been treated in different sections below.

=== Development aid effectiveness (historical perspective) ===
==== 1945 – early 1970s: Post-war boom ====
Although US aid is widely credited with having hastened the reconstruction of western Europe after World War II, there have been doubts about the effectiveness of this aid. G. A. Duncan in 1950 deplored the governmental character of Marshall Aid, arguing that private loans could have achieved the economic purposes more efficiently. He acknowledged that the provision of official aid also had other – political – purposes.

When US economic aid shifted from Europe to poorer countries – as initially signalled by President Truman in Point Four of his 1949 inauguration speech – the strategic framework was one of building a "free world" in the face of communist threat. In the 1950s, official US development assistance was mobilized alongside military aid within the Mutual Security Program. A 1957 Senate Special Committee report admitted it was impossible to prove how effective US aid since World War II had been, but considered that, without it, several countries might have been lost to the Soviet Union's sphere of influence. For greater clarity in future, the committee attempted to distill the purposes of US aid into four:

- The defense need: aid could persuade and enable other nations to be military allies (important for maintaining air bases in distant parts of the world).
- The economic need: aid could bring more nations into a global system of commerce that would benefit the US.
- The political need: aid could be one factor (among many others needed) for helping countries to make "long-range political progress toward freedom" rather than totalitarianism.
- The humanitarian motive, which was seen in responding to "natural disasters or other unexpected conditions".

The first of these aid drivers could be seen, during the Cold War, as part of a competition with the Soviet Union to win influence. But aid was often observed to fail in this respect; for instance, in the 1950s and 1960s Egypt and Afghanistan took aid from both sides without making a decisive commitment either way, and large Russian support to China and Indonesia did not prevent those countries' leaders turning against their former patron.

A more detailed theory about the kinds of effect and the causal paths through which aid could be effective was developed by Max Millikan and Walt Rostow in the mid- to late-1950s, expressed in "A Proposal" of 1956. This propounded that aid in the form of investment funds could promote the "take-off" of economies into self-reliant growth. It further suggested that this economic transformation, channeled properly, could produce a free and democratic type of society by providing: a constructive outlet for nationalism; a social solvent by interesting the urban elites in a dynamic agricultural sector; a stimulus for the emergence of authentic leaders; incentives for the attitudes of political responsibility needed to support democratisation; and feelings of international solidarity. Rostow later elaborated the "take-off" theory of development in his more famous work, "The Stages of Economic Growth", in which he stated that greatly increased economic aid was needed in order to outrace the effects of population growth.

In 1966, Hollis Chenery and Alan Strout published a still more sophisticated and influential macro-economic model of the way aid could boost development. It involved identifying for each country whether the bottlenecks to economic growth lay in the availability of skills, domestic savings, or export earnings. In this way, an appropriate mix of technical assistance, grants or loans could be decided. The focus was on achieving a target level of GNP growth, which helped consolidate this as the prime indicator of aid effectiveness. At this time Chenery and Strout pointed to the Philippines, Taiwan, Greece and Israel as examples of countries that seemed to have achieved self-sustaining growth rates with the help of aid.

==== Early 1970s – mid-1990s: Rise of neoliberalism ====
The end of the post-war boom – marked particularly by the oil crisis of 1973 – was a watershed in attitudes to aid effectiveness, as it forced a reappraisal of the existing models.

In the 1980s and 1990s NGOs played a greater part in international aid.

After the end of the Cold War, the declared focus of official aid began to move further towards the alleviation of poverty and the promotion of development. The countries that were in the most need and poverty became more of a priority. Once the Cold War ended, Western donors were able to enforce aid conditionality better because they no longer had geopolitical interests in recipient countries. This allowed donors to condition aid on the basis that recipient governments make economic changes as well as democratic changes. It is against this background that the international aid effectiveness movement began taking shape in the late 1990s as donor governments and aid agencies began working together to improve effectiveness.

==== Late 1990s onward: Millennial partnerships ====
===== The global "effectiveness" movement =====
Aid effectiveness became more strongly recognized as a global multilateral objective in 2002 at the International Conference on Financing for Development in Monterrey, Mexico, which established the Monterrey Consensus. There, the international community agreed to increase its funding for development—but acknowledged that more money alone was not enough. Donors and developing countries alike wanted to know that aid would be used as effectively as possible. They wanted it to play its optimum role in helping poor countries achieve the Millennium Development Goals, the set of targets agreed by 192 countries in 2000 which aimed to halve world poverty by 2015. Over the following nine years, a process punctuated by four high level forums on aid effectiveness (Rome 2003, Paris 2005, Accra 2008 and Busan 2011) consolidated a set of recognised good practices in aid effectiveness, and a framework for monitoring them.

In 2011 the dominant global agenda on "aid effectiveness" was subsumed in a broader movement for "effective development cooperation". This was embodied in the Global Partnership for Effective Development Co-operation (GPEDC) mandated at the Fourth High-Level Forum on Aid Effectiveness in Busan in 2011. GPEDC endorsed the prior "aid effectiveness" principles and commitments, and added others more widely concerned with development cooperation.

Another global partnership that follows the "effective development cooperation" approach is UHC2030 (the International Health Partnership for Universal Health Care 2030), formerly known simply as the International Health Partnership (or IHP+). (See below for more details of the aid effectiveness principles and practices advocated by this movement and its component partnerships.)

=== Humanitarian aid effectiveness (historical perspective) ===
Widespread famine in Biafra during the Nigerian Civil War (1967–1970) led to greater NGO involvement in events like the Biafran airlift being attempted for the first time. The way in which aid was allocated during the 1983–1985 famine in Ethiopia forever changed the way in which governments and NGOs respond to international emergencies taking place within conflict situations and raised disturbing questions about the relationship between humanitarian agencies and host governments.

== Findings and critiques ==
There is wide agreement that aid alone is not enough to lift developing countries out of poverty and that it is not the most powerful potential instrument for promoting this end. The debates on aid effectiveness are over the degree of significance of aid's effects, the extent of its unfavourable effects, and the relative effectiveness of different kinds of aid.

=== Major critiques ===
==== P. T. Bauer ====
British economist P. T. Bauer argued that aid did more harm than good, notably in his books "Dissent on Development" (1972) and "Reality and Rhetoric" (1984). The main harmful effect was that aid channelled resources through governments, enabling inefficient state planning and producing a general "politicization of life" in which the population shifted its activities to the political sphere rather than the economic one. On the other side, Bauer saw aid's benefits as being limited to the avoidance of commercial loan costs, which he did not consider to be a significant factor in countries' development (pp. 47–49). He believed that the choices of aid projects were usually controlled by recipient governments less interested in alleviating poverty than enriching the elite (pp. 49–52).

==== Dambisa Moyo ====
Noted Zambian economist Dambisa Moyo has been a fierce opponent to development aid, and calls it "the single worst decision of modern developmental politics". Her 2009 book, Dead Aid describes how aid has encouraged kleptocracies, corruption, aid-dependency and a series of detrimental economic effects and vicious downward spirals of development in Africa. She argues that foreign aid provides a windfall to governments which can encourage extreme forms of rent-seeking and through providing a positive shock of revenue, lead to Dutch Disease. Furthermore, this easy money offers governments an exit from the contract between them and their electorate: the contract that states that they must provide public goods in exchange for taxes. In short, it "allows the state to abdicate its responsibilities toward its people". Moyo alludes specifically to government bilateral and multilateral aid and not small-holder charity, humanitarian or emergency aid. Her prescriptions call for increased trade and foreign direct investment, emphasizing China's burgeoning role in Africa. Moyo also makes a case for micro-financing schemes, as popularized by the widespread success of Grameen Bank, to spark entrepreneurship within the continent on the ground level, thus building from the bottom-up as opposed to the top-down approach aid takes.

=== Econometric studies ===
Many econometric studies have attempted to establish broad conclusions about aid, using regression analysis on a panel of recipient countries (seeing if their differing amounts and timings of aid received could be correlated with development indicators). These have created a mixed picture on the average effectiveness of aid, but one in which pessimism in the late 20th century has seemed to yield to qualified optimism in the early 21st century. (See the table in the sub-section on "§ Major econometric studies and their findings", below.)

==== Challenges for measurement ====
It must be borne in mind that such econometric studies face many problems. One challenge for assessing the effectiveness of aid is that aid is intended to serve a variety of purposes: some of it is aimed primarily at poverty alleviation, some at economic growth, and some at other objectives such as better governance or reduction of social inequalities. Often it is not very clear what objectives are foremost, making it hard to measure results against intentions. Roodman (2007), for instance, discovered that the results of seven previous econometric studies – including the very influential one by Burnside and Dollar (1997, 2000) – could not survive defining key terms in other plausible ways. Moreover, different objectives have different implications for the time-scale in which results should be sought. Varying sectors and modalities of aid have different effects, as do the contextual factors in recipient countries. However, increasingly sophisticated analyses have made progress in accounting for these complicated effects.

Econometric studies frequently show more pessimistic results than might be expected from the accumulation of successes reported by donor and implementing agencies in their projects and programs. Paul Mosley termed this the micro-macro paradox and offered three potential explanations: inaccurate measurement, fungibility, and "backwash" or negative side-effects of component aid projects. The micro-macro paradox has also been attributed to inadequate assessment practices. For example, conventional assessment techniques often over-emphasize inputs and outputs without taking sufficient account of societal impacts. The shortcomings of prevalent assessment practices have led to a gradual international trend towards more rigorous methods of impact assessment.

==== Major econometric studies and their findings ====
The main findings of major econometric studies are summarized in the following table.

Table of econometric studies on aid effectiveness
| Author/year | Period | Findings on aid effectiveness; |
|---|---|---|
| Mosley 1987 | 1960-1980 | Aid had no significant effect on economic growth. The reason seemed to be fungibility: aid likely released other resources for unproductive uses. |
| Boone 1996 | 1971-1990 | Aid had no clear effect on rates of infant mortality and primary education. |
| Burnside and Dollar 1997, 2000 | 1970-1993 | Aid had a positive impact on growth in developing countries with good policies. But the overall effect of aid was unclear because donors did not especially target such countries. |
| Svensson 1999 | 1980s, 1990s | Aid had a positive impact on growth in more democratic countries. But aid on average was not channeled to more democratic countries. |
| Arvin and Borillas 2002 | 1975-1998 | Aid had no clear effect on GNP per capita. |
| Kosack 2003 | 1974-1985 | Aid had no clear effect on average, but improved the quality of life when combined with democracy. |
| Dunning 2004 | 1975-1997 | In the first few years after the Cold War foreign aid produced a small positive effect on democracy in sub-Saharan African countries, unlike in the previous 15 years. |
| Easterly et al. 2004 | 1970-1997 | The finding of Burnside and Dollar (2000, see above) is not robust to different definitions of aid and good policy. |
| Mosley et al. 2004 | 1980-2000 | Aid increased pro-poor public spending in low-income countries. |
| Rajan and Subramanian 2005 | 1960-2000 | There was on average no robust positive relationship between aid and growth. |
| Yontcheva and Masud 2005 | 1990-2001 | Aid by NGOs co-financed by the European Commission reduced infant mortality but bilateral aid generally did not. |
| Calderon et al. 2006 | 1971–2002 | Aid had no clear effect on poverty, inequality, economic growth or democratic institutions. |
| Mosley and Suleiman 2007 | 1980-2002 | Aid most effectively reduced poverty when it supported public expenditures on agriculture, education and infrastructure. |
| Bahmani-Oskooee and Oyolola 2009 | 1981-2002 | Aid was on average effective in reducing poverty. |
| Clemens et al. 2011 | 1970-2000 | Aid had a modest positive effect on economic growth. |
| Alvi and Senbeta 2012 | 1981-2004 | Aid—especially multilateral aid—significantly reduced poverty. |
| Kaya et al. 2013 | 1980-2003 | Aid to agriculture significantly reduced poverty. |
| Hirano and Otsubo 2014 | 1990s, 2000s | Social aid directly benefitted the poorest in society, while economic aid increased the income of the poor through growth. |
| Nunn and Qian 2014 | 1971-2006 | U.S. food aid increased the incidence and duration of civil conflicts, but had no robust effect on inter-state conflicts or the onset of civil conflicts. |
| Arndt et al 2015 | 1970-2007 | Aid moderately stimulated growth, promoted structural change, improved social indicators, and reduced poverty. |
| Petrikova 2015 | 1994-2011 | Aid had a small positive effect on food security |
| Janjua et al. 2018 | 1995-2009 | Project aid had a significant effect on economic growth. Programme aid had a significant effect on social development. |
| Abellán and Alonso 2022 | 1990-2015 | Aid had a positive effect on access to safe drinking water, this effect being especially important when consistent long-term investments are put into place. |

=== Analyses of limiting factors ===
==== Aid fragmentation ====
Aid flows significantly increased in the first decade of the 21st century, but at the same time aid has become increasingly fragmented. There was an explosion in the number of donors, and while the number of projects multiplied, their average size dropped. Small projects being often limited in size, scope and duration, they resulted in little lasting benefit beyond the immediate effect. With more players, aid became less predictable, less transparent and more volatile.

Fragmentation means an increase in costs for recipient countries, as government offices are forced to divert administrative resources to cope with requests and meetings with donors Decades of development have shown that if countries are to become less dependent on aid, they must follow a bottom-up approach, where they determine their own priorities and rely on their own systems to deliver that aid.

==== Volatility/unpredictability of aid ====
Information, at the donors' as well at the recipients' level, is often poor, incomplete and difficult to compare with other data, and beneficiaries' feedback and formal project evaluations are rare. Aid is predictable when partner countries can be confident about the amount and the timing of aid disbursement. Not being predictable has a cost: one study assessed the deadweight loss associated with volatility at an average of 10% to 20% of a developing country's programmable aid from the European Union in recent years.

==== Reducing the accountability of governments ====
Revenue generation is one of the essential pillars for developing state capacity. Effective taxation methods allow a state to provide public goods and services, from ensuring justice to providing education. Taxation simultaneously serves as a government accountability mechanism, building state-citizen relationships, as citizens can now expect such service provisions upon their consent to taxation. For developing and fragile states that lack such revenue capabilities, while aid can be a seemingly necessary alternative, it has the potential to undermine institutional development. States that rely on higher percentages of aid for government revenue are less accountable to their citizens by avoiding the state-citizen relationships that taxation builds and face fewer incentives to develop public institutions. The limited government capacity resulting from subpar institutional presence and effectiveness leads to: "ubiquitous corruption of state officials, large gaps between the law and actual practice in business regulation, workers who do not even show up, doctors that do not doctor, teachers who do not teach."

In the view of James Shikwati, aid in Africa sustains political elites who implement a colonial or neo-colonial agenda of subsidy and distortion of markets which holds African countries back.

==== Tying of aid ====
Tied aid is defined as project aid contracted by source to private firms in the donor country. It refers to aid tied to goods and services supplied exclusively by donor country businesses or agencies. Tied aid increases the cost of assistance and has the tendency of making donors to focus more on the commercial advancement of their countries than what developing countries need. There are many ways aid can be designed to pursue the commercial objectives of donors. One means is by insisting on donor country products.

Others have argued that tying aid to donor-country products is common sense; it is a strategic use of aid to promote donor country's business or exports. It is further argued that tied aid – if well designed and effectively managed – would not necessarily compromise the quality as well as the effectiveness of aid. However, this argument would hold particularly for programme aid, where aid is tied to a specific projects or policies and where there is little or no commercial interest. It must be emphasized, however, that commercial interest and aid effectiveness are two different things, and it would be difficult to pursue commercial interest without compromising aid effectiveness. Thus, the idea of maximizing development should be separated from the notion of pursuing commercial interest. Tied aid improves donors export performance, creates business for local companies and jobs. It also helps to expose firms, which have not had any international experience on the global market to do so.

==== Fungibility of aid ====
Aid fungibility refers to the fact that upon receiving international aid, and therefore have more fiscal flexibility, recipient countries and their governments may divert their resources to other expenses. Especially, when projects financed by international aid achieve some goals that the government would have needed to achieve on its own, absent of aid, the local resources that were saved can be used for other purposes. It is a factor in the discussion about aid effectiveness and the effects of aid fungibility on development are debated.

===== Concept and mechanisms =====
Foreign aid can be categorized as either earmarked aid (allocated for a specific project or sector) or general budget support (provided with fewer restrictions). When aid is fungible, recipient governments may reduce their own spending in areas where donors provide assistance and reallocate those funds to other priorities, which may not align with donors' initial intentions. In the case of earmarked aid, the goal is often to limit fungibility by specifying how funds should be spent (infrastructure, health, education), though difficult to enforce. Using general budget support provides governments with more flexibility, enabling recipient them to allocate funds according to their own priorities, thereby increasing the likelihood of fungibility.

In practice, aid fungibility can occur through several mechanisms:

- Sectoral substitution: Governments may decrease domestic spending in sectors where they receive foreign aid and reallocate funds elsewhere, whether it is for military spending or debt repayment. In the education and health sector, it appears that technical cooperation reduces fungibility.
- Geographical reallocation: Aid targeted at specific regions may allow governments to divert resources to other areas. An example is the Case Study on Chinese aid in Africa.
- Macroeconomic adjustments: Aid may affect overall government fiscal policies, including tax collection and borrowing strategies.

===== Implications for development =====
The effects of aid fungibility on development outcomes are debated. Some studies suggest that fungibility reduces aid effectiveness by weakening donor control over expenditures, potentially allowing funds to be used for purposes unrelated to development. Others argue that fungibility can have positive effects if governments reallocate the resources to areas with greater needs, or if it enhances overall welfare.

Aid fungibility can also impact governance and accountability. When governments have more discretion over aid funds, it may lead to more efficient spending or, conversely, increased opportunities for misallocation.

Aid projects can also be in competition with government projects. If successful, they can become substitutes for government performance. In that case, voters' accountability towards their leaders is flawed, as the governments becomes popular due to the success of projects it is not responsible for, while taking credit for the work done by NGOs. This relates to literature about aid dependency, as aid can become a substitute and disincentivize state capacity of the government. Higher dependence on aid lowers state capacity and ultimately distorts the link between the government and its citizens.

===== Case studies =====
Empirical research has provided mixed evidence on the extent and consequences of aid fungibility:

- A study on China's foreign aid to Africa found that aid projects were often located in politically strategic areas, suggesting that recipient governments influence aid allocation. Indeed, aid provided by China is found to be redirected to local leaders' ethnic homeland, as compared to other regions. On the other hand, this effect is not present with development projects financed by the World Bank.
- Research in Pakistan suggested that aid fungibility might contribute to better overall resource allocation, improving social outcomes. In this study, it is shown that there is a "U-shaped" relationship between aid received by the government and its expenditures on development projects. That is, when receiving a low amount of aid, the government will invest more in development projects with its resources. When the amount of aid received increases, the incentive to spend on development projects decreases.
- Studies on Rwanda and Malawi examined how recipient governments' control over aid influences public spending, with varied effects on efficiency and transparency. The experiment in Malawi showed that politicians receiving information about existing development projects in local schools were less likely to send development money to those schools and target other needy but not-yet-targeted areas. The study in Rwanda investigates aid fungibility when countries take ownership of their development programs. Akin to the Pakistan study, a "U-shaped" relationship between aid received and government expenditures on development. While the government was able to shift aid to projects that were in its priorities, increasing aid effectiveness, concerns were raised about certain sectors being left aside, and the need for control from institutions.

== Improvement ==
=== Conditionalities ===
A major proportion of aid from donor nations is tied, mandating that a receiving nation spend on products and expertise originating only from the donor country. Eritrea discovered that it would be cheaper to build its network of railways with local expertise and resources rather than to spend aid money on foreign consultants and engineers. US law, backed by strong farm interests, requires food aid be spent on buying food from the US rather than locally, and, as a result, half of what is spent is used on transport. As a result, tying aid is estimated to increase the cost of aid by 15–30%. Oxfam America and American Jewish World Service report that reforming US food aid programs could extend food aid to an additional 17.1 million people around the world.

The World Bank and the International Monetary Fund, as primary holders of developing countries' debt, attach structural adjustment conditionalities to loans which generally include the elimination of state subsidies and the privatization of state services. For example, the World Bank presses poor nations to eliminate subsidies for fertilizer even while many farmers cannot afford them at market prices. In the case of Malawi, almost five million of its 13 million people used to need emergency food aid. However, after the government changed policy and subsidies for fertilizer and seed were introduced, farmers produced record-breaking corn harvests in 2006 and 2007 as production leaped to 3.4 million in 2007 from 1.2 million in 2005, making Malawi a major food exporter. In the former Soviet states, the reconfiguration of public financing in their transition to a market economy called for reduced spending on health and education, sharply increasing poverty.

In their April 2002 publication, Oxfam Report reveals that aid tied to trade liberalization by the donor countries such as the European Union with the aim of achieving economic objective is becoming detrimental to developing countries. For example, the EU subsidizes its agricultural sectors in the expense of Latin America who must liberalize trade in order to qualify for aid. Latin America, a region with a comparative advantage on agriculture and a great reliance on its agricultural export sector, loses $4 billion annually due to EU farming subsidy policies. Carlos Santiso advocates a "radical approach in which donors cede control to the recipient country".

=== Cash aid versus in-kind aid ===
A report by a High Level Panel on Humanitarian Cash Transfers found that only 6% of aid is delivered in the form of cash or vouchers. But there is a growing realization among aid groups that, for locally available goods, giving cash or cash vouchers instead of imported goods is a cheaper, faster, and more efficient way to deliver aid.

Evidence shows that cash can be more transparent, more accountable, more cost effective, help support local markets and economies, and increase financial inclusion and give people more dignity and choice. Sending cash is cheaper as it does not have the same transaction costs as shipping goods. Sending cash is also faster than shipping the goods. In 2009 for sub-Saharan Africa, food bought locally by the WFP cost 34 percent less and arrived 100 days faster than food sent from the United States, where buying food from the United States is required by law. Cash aid also helps local food producers, usually the poorest in their countries, while imported food may damage their livelihoods and risk continuing hunger in the future. Unconditional cash transfers, for example, appear to be an effective intervention for reducing extreme poverty, while at the same time also improving health and education outcomes.

The World Food Programme (WFP), the biggest non-governmental distributor of food, announced that it will begin distributing cash and vouchers instead of food in some areas, which Josette Sheeran, the WFP's executive director, described as a "revolution" in food aid.

=== Coordination ===
While the number of Non-governmental Organization have increased dramatically over the past few decades, fragmentation in aid policy is an issue. Because of such fragmentation, health workers in several African countries, for example, say they are so busy meeting western delegates that they can only do their proper jobs in the evening.

One of the Paris Declaration's priorities is to reduce systems of aid that are "parallel" to local systems. For example, Oxfam reported that, in Mozambique, donors are spending $350 million a year on 3,500 technical consultants, which is enough to hire 400,000 local civil servants, weakening local capacity. Between 2005 and 2007, the number of parallel systems did fall, by about 10% in 33 countries. In order to improve coordination and reduce parallel systems, the Paris Declaration suggests that aid recipient countries lay down a set of national development priorities and that aid donors fit in with those plans.

=== Aid priorities ===
Laurie Garret, author of the article "The Challenge of Global Health" points out that the current aid and resources are being targeted at very specific, high-profile diseases, rather than at general public health. Aid is "stovepiped" towards narrow, short-term goals relating to particular programs or diseases such as increasing the number of people receiving anti-retroviral treatment, and increasing distribution of bed nets. These are band aid solutions to larger problems, as it takes healthcare systems and infrastructure to create significant change. Donors lack the understanding that effort should be focused on broader measures that affect general well-being of the population, and substantial change will take generations to achieve. Aid often does not provide maximum benefit to the recipient, and reflects the interests of the donor.

Furthermore, consider the breakdown, where aid goes and for what purposes. In 2002, total gross foreign aid to all developing countries was $76 billion. Dollars that do not contribute to a country's ability to support basic needs interventions are subtracted. Subtract $6 billion for debt relief grants. Subtract $11 billion, which is the amount developing countries paid to developed nations in that year in the form of loan repayments. Next, subtract the aid given to middle income countries, $16 billion. The remainder, $43 billion, is the amount that developing countries received in 2002. But only $12 billion went to low-income countries in a form that could be deemed budget support for basic needs. When aid is given to the Least Developed Countries who have good governments and strategic plans for the aid, it is thought that it is more effective.

=== Logistics ===
Humanitarian aid is argued to often not reach those who are intended to receive it. For example, a report composed by the World Bank in 2006 stated that an estimated half of the funds donated towards health programs in sub-Saharan Africa did not reach the clinics and hospitals. Money is paid out to fake accounts, prices are increased for transport or warehousing, and drugs are sold to the black market. Another example is in Ghana, where approximately 80% of donations do not go towards their intended purposes. This type of corruption only adds to the criticism of aid, as it is not helping those who need it, and may be adding to the problem. Only about one fifth of U.S. aid goes to countries classified by the OECD as 'least developed.' This "pro-rich" trend is not unique to the United States. According to Collier, "the middle income countries get aid because they are of much more commercial and political interest than the tiny markets and powerlessness of the bottom billion." What this means is that, at the most basic level, aid is not targeting the most extreme poverty.

The logistics in which the delivery of humanitarian occurs can be problematic. For example, an earthquake in 2003 in Bam, Iran left tens of thousands of people in need of disaster zone aid. Although aid was flown in rapidly, regional belief systems, cultural backgrounds and even language seemed to have been omitted as a source of concern. Items such as religiously prohibited pork, and non-generic forms of medicine that lacked multilingual instructions came flooding in as relief. An implementation of aid can easily be problematic, causing more problems than it solves.

Considering transparency, the amount of aid that is recorded accurately has risen from 42% in 2005 to 48% in 2007.

=== Improving the economic efficiency of aid ===
Currently, donor institutions make proposals for aid packages to recipient countries. The recipient countries then make a plan for how to use the aid based on how much money has been given to them. Alternatively, NGO's receive funding from private sources or the government and then implement plans to address their specific issues. According to Sachs, in the view of some scholars, this system is inherently ineffective.

According to Sachs, we should redefine how we think of aid. The first step should be to learn what developing countries hope to accomplish and how much money they need to accomplish those goals. Goals should be made with the Millennium Development Goals in mind for these furnish real metrics for providing basic needs. The "actual transfer of funds must be based on rigorous, country-specific plans that are developed through open and consultative processes, backed by good governance in the recipient countries, as well as careful planning and evaluation."

Possibilities are also emerging as some developing countries are experiencing rapid economic growth, they are able to provide their own expertise gained from their recent transition. This knowledge transfer can be seen in donors, such as Brazil, whose $1 billion in aid outstrips that of many traditional donors. Brazil provides most of its aid in the form of technical expertise and knowledge transfers. This has been described by some observers as a 'global model in waiting'.

=== Using the private sector ===
According to Laurie Garrett, for health aid to be maximized efficiently and most optimally, donations need to be directed to areas such as local industries, franchises, or profit centers in developing countries. By doing so, these actions can sustain health related spending and result in growth in the long run.

Paul Collier, in The Bottom Billion, suggests a model he calls "Independent Service Authorities". These are organizations, independent from the government, that co-opt civil society to manage aid and public money and incorporate the scrutiny of public opinion and NGOs to determine how to maximize output from the expenditure of this money.

=== Sensitivity to recipient country institutions ===
Since the effectiveness of aid usually depends on the good-functioning of institutions in the recipient country, and since potential recipients are very varied in this respect, Charles Kenny (2006) argues that aid strategies must be tailored to the state of institutions in each case. Where institutions are strong, it is appropriate to provide programmatic aid. Where they are weak, there may be a role for aid in analysis, consensus-building and technical assistance to improve them, and meanwhile other "insulated" projects might go ahead if they do not harm the prospects for developing sound governmental institutions.

=== Best practices according to the High Level Forums on Aid Effectiveness ===
The Paris Declaration and other results of the High Level Forums on Aid Effectiveness (2003-2011) embodied a broad consensus on what needed to be done to produce better development results. Its principles lay open the possible ways to undertake, which can be interpreted also as the major objectives of good aid: fostering recipient countries' ownership of development policies and strategies, maximizing donors' coordination and harmonization, improving aid transparency and mutual accountability of donors and recipients, just to name a few.

The forums were supported by work done by the OECD, which had explored—through peer reviews and other work by the Development Assistance Committee (DAC)—the reasons why aid has and has not worked. This has resulted in a body of best practices and principles that can be applied globally to make aid work better.

==== Improving aid transparency and mutual accountability of donors and recipients ====
Some believe that the way to improvement is through better monitoring and evaluation, increased transparency, accountability and learning. For instance, Stefan Schmitz, a former senior aid official in the German government and the OECD, has argued that reporting duties, results-orientated action and ongoing performance assessments are essential for the sake of aid effectiveness, but political will must be already there for this to happen.

The Accra Agenda for Action states that transparency and accountability are essential elements for development results, as well as drivers of progress. Mutual accountability and transparency is one of the five partnership commitments of the Paris Declaration. Through 'transparency', donors and recipients can be held accountable for what they spend and aid can be made more effective by knowing the three Ws of transparency:

- Who gives money to which recipient?
- What project is being funded and for what purpose? and
- Where?

Transparency offers a valuable answer to insecurity, making aid "predictable" and "reliable". Transparency has been shown to improve service delivery and to reduce opportunities for diversion and therefore corruption.

Transparency can be defined as a basic expression of mutual accountability. Mutual accountability can only work if there is a global culture of transparency that demands provision of information through a set of rules and behavioral norms, which are difficult to enforce in the case of official development cooperation. In particular for emerging economy donors and private development assistance, these norms are only at a nascent stage. Kharas suggest to adopt the "regulation through information" approach, which has been developed and has proven its effectiveness in the case of the European integration. In fact, at the international level, when the enforcement of mandatory rules is difficult, the solution could be to provide and make available transparent, relevant, accurate and reliable information, which can be used to reward or sanction individual aid agencies according to their performances. This means establishing a strong culture of accountability within aid, which rewards aid successes but penalizes failures.

To achieve this, literature on the topic suggest that donors should agree on adopting a standardized format for providing information on volume, allocation and results, such as the International Aid Transparency Initiative (IATI), or other similar standards, and commit to improve recipient countries' databases with technical, financial and informational support. The format should be easily downloadable and with sufficient disaggregation to enable comparison with other data. Making aid data public and comparable among donors, would be likely to encourage a process of positive emulation towards a better usage of public funds. After all, official development assistance (ODA) is a voluntary transfer that depends on the support of donor country taxpayers. Donors should therefore consider improving the transparency and traceability of aid funds also as a way of increasing engagement and support toward aid inside their own country. Moreover, a generalized adoption of IATI would ensure the publication of aid information in a timely way, the compatibility with developing countries' budgets and the reliability of future projections, which would have a strong and positive effect on the predictability of aid.

Finally, to improve accountability while building evaluation capabilities in aid recipient countries and systematically collecting beneficiaries' feedback, different mechanisms to evaluate and monitor transparency should be considered, such as independent third-party reviews, peer reviews or mutual reviews.

== See also ==
- Aid for Trade
- Development Assistance Committee
- Development Assistance Database
- Eurodad
- G8+5
- Humanitarian Response Index
- International Aid Transparency Initiative
- International Health Partnership
- Monterrey Consensus
