= List of ICT4D organizations =

This is a list of organisations that claim to work in the field of information and communication technologies for development (ICT4Dev). The sections below show two separate classifications:

- organisations founded specifically with the sole purpose of engaging in ICT4Dev activities (i.e. activities that benefit the poorest people in the world)
- commercial companies with ICT4Dev activities, which may be seen as marketing or corporate social responsibility exercises.

== Founded for ICT4Dev ==
=== Aptivate ===
In 2003 Aptivate was founded as a nonprofit company limited by guarantee in Cambridge, UK, to solve the problems aid workers experienced accessing the internet in low bandwidth environments. (Its name at the time of incorporation was AidWorld; this changed in 2005).

Over subsequent years, Aptivate's technical work has expanded to include building web sites, integrating mobile data gathering systems, producing systems for data visualization, and developing the open-source monitoring and evaluation platform Kashana. Aptivate has also expanded its work to include training in various technical subjects, consultancy, and authoring of related works. Aptivate provided the lead authors on the World Bank Guide to Digital Citizen Engagement, to be published in Autumn 2015.

=== UN ICT Task Force ===
In 2001 the United Nations Information and Communication Technologies Task Force was formed to address a variety of ICT4Dev topics. The Task Force held semi-annual meetings focusing on specific themes, including a Global Forum on Internet Governance (UN headquarters in New York, March 2004); a Global Forum on an Enabling Environment (Berlin, November 2004); and a Global Forum on Harnessing the Potential of ICTs in Education (Dublin, April 2005). The UN ICT Task Force's mandate ended on December 31, 2005. A new group, called the 'Global Alliance for ICT and Development', was created to continue much of the work of the UN ICTTF.

In November 2002, UN Secretary-General Kofi Annan issued a call for Silicon Valley to create the computers and communications systems that would enable villages to leapfrog several generations of technology and enter the Information Age directly. This would provide the technical basis for WSIS (World Summit on the Information Society) discussions.

=== World Summit on the Information Society (WSIS) ===
This United Nations initiative held summits in Geneva in 2003 and Tunis in 2005. After Tunis, a Plan of Action is being followed, with a ten-year deadline ending in 2015. This parallels the timeframe for the Millennium Development Goals.

=== Global Alliance for ICT and Development ===
In 2006, at the end of his tenure, outgoing UN Secretary-General Kofi Annan launched the Global Alliance for ICT and Development (GAID).

It is described as a "multi-stakeholder forum" and a "cross-sectoral platform and forum that will bring together all stakeholders representing relevant constituencies". It includes a large number of persons from the fields of government, development cooperation, foreign policy, finance, the social sector (health, education), regulatory agencies, industry and workers' associations, producers and consumers of ICT, the media, non-governmental organisations, community social organisations, foundations, scientific, academic and ICT communities and "individuals providing advocacy and oversight on Information Society issues and implementing programs addressing the United Nations' MDGs Millennium Development Goals."

GAID is led by a steering committee, with Intel's Craig Barrett as its chairman.

It has a Strategy Council, a set of high-level advisors, and a "champions' network". The Global Alliance for ICT and Development held its first meeting on June 19 and June 20, 2006 in Kuala Lumpur, Malaysia.

GAID Global Forum 2010 was organized in partnership with the government of Abu Dhabi on December 5–6, 2010. The theme for the 2010 forum was "ICT for MDGs: Moving from Advocacy to Action." It was attended by members from governments, the private sector, civil society, and international organizations. Archived videos from the forum are available on the GAID website www.un-gaid.org or GAID Global Forum 2010.

=== Asia Pacific Development Information Programme and International Open Source Network ===
The United Nations—through its various organisations such as the United Nations Development Programme's Asia Pacific Development Information Programme (APDIP) – has brought out a number of publications. Many are published with shareable content licenses. Specifically in the field of Free/Libre and Open Source Software (FLOSS), the International Open Source Network (IOSN) has been an active player.

UNDP-APDIP publishes two series of e-primers, namely the e-Primers for the Information Economy, Society and Polity and the e-Primers on Free/Open Source Software. The former series details the concepts, issues, and trends surrounding the information economy, society and polity. It intends to raise awareness and help policy makers and planners understand the relevance of information and communications technology (ICT) for development, by explaining technical jargon in simple terms. The latter series serves as an introduction to various aspects and dimensions of FLOSS, with country case studies. It aims to raise awareness on FLOSS issues and support capacity building efforts.

=== The International Development Research Centre (IDRC) ===
The IDRC is a Canadian governmental agency (crown corporation) that has a very broad programme which includes many small to mid-sized ICT4Dev projects. The IDRC is also one of the major sponsors of the telecentre.org movement.

=== The One Laptop per Child Project and 50x15 ===
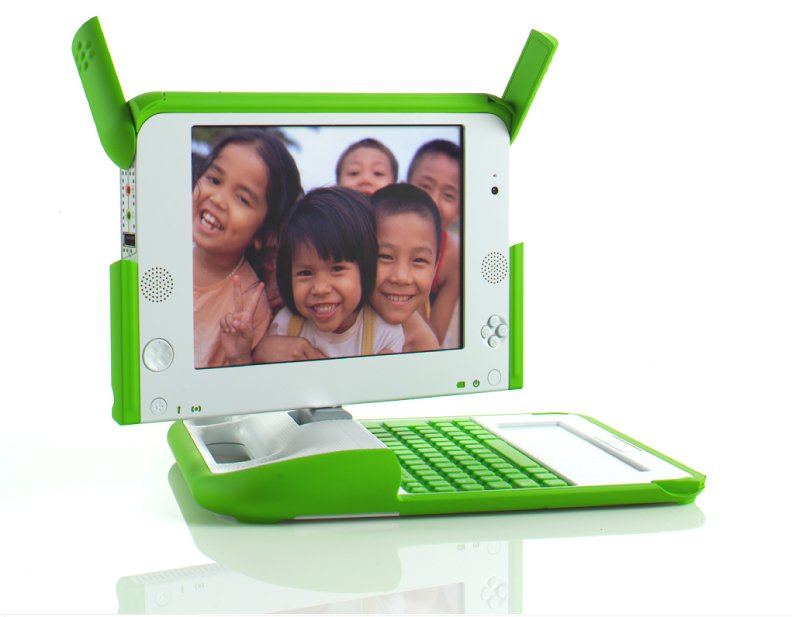
OLPC XO-1 laptop.

OLPC was a high-profile project initiated by Nicholas Negroponte. Several large companies were members of the organisation including MIT and chip manufacturer AMD, and it had a wide open source community. The aim was to produce laptops cheaply enough to provide them to every school child in the world. Through this aim, the project has generated much exposure for ICT4Dev in general.

The 50x15-project is a similar worldwide project, offering low-cost computers from a variety of manufacturers.

=== Zidisha P2P Microfinance ===
Zidisha is an online peer-to-peer lending platform that allows individuals in developing countries to raise microfinance loans from individuals worldwide. Unlike earlier microfinancing websites such as Kiva, Zidisha does not work through local intermediary organizations. Instead, the individual borrowers themselves use the Zidisha website to create Facebook-style profiles and negotiate loans with individuals in the US and Europe. Zidisha lenders and borrowers dialogue with each other directly in the loan profile pages and Zidisha forum.

=== Computer Aid International ===
Founded in 1998 Computer Aid International is a not-for-profit organisation that facilitates the practical application of ICT4Dev solutions to social development challenges. Computer Aid provides resources and project management inputs to projects in focal areas for ICT4Dev that include eLearning, eInclusion, eHealth and rural connectivity. Current initiatives include the promotion and training of the open learning platform Moodle in Africa universities; development of FLOSS software for blind and visually impaired users; telemedicine projects for rural hospitals; advocacy around eWaste and a wide variety of school initiatives. Computer Aid is perhaps most well known for having provided over 160,000 professionally refurbished PCs to educational institutions and not-for-profit development organisations in more than 100 different developing countries.

=== Dimagi ===
Founded in 2002, Dimagi Inc. is a software social enterprise that develops open source ICT solutions for low-resource settings. Dimagi has performed technical strategy, systems design, software development, and research for 100+ projects worldwide, and its core product suite supports thousands of Frontline Workers in over 40 countries. Dimagi has a history of executing ICT4D projects as a technical lead, partnered with an in-country implementation lead. This model has been implemented for pilot-phase projects through enterprise-wide deployments with over 75 partners, including WHO, World Bank, USAID, CDC, World Vision, UNICEF, PATH, and the Rockefeller Foundation. Dimagi also has experience conducting research on ICT4D, which has led to 18 peer-reviewed publications about its primary mobile health platform, CommCare.

=== Inveneo ===
Graph of internet users per 100 inhabitants between 1997 and 2007 by International Telecommunication Union

Inveneo is a 501(c)(3) non-profit organization based in San Francisco focused on ICT4Dev in mostly, Uganda. The organization developed thin client called Inveneo Computing Station, which is similarly to Linutop 2 based on a reference design ION A603 mini PC by First International Computer and runs AMD Geode CPU. Inveneo also helped to set up a communication system for relief workers after Hurricane Katrina. Jamais Cascio, a co-founder of WorldChanging, featured Inveneo in July 2005.

=== International Institute for Communication and Development (IICD) ===
The International Institute for Communication and Development (IICD) is a non-profit foundation that specialises in ICT as a tool for development. It was founded in 1996 by the Dutch Ministry for Development Cooperation to help developing countries in their efforts to overcome the digital divide. IICD works in the sectors Education, Livelihoods, Health and Governance.

=== SPIDER (Swedish Program for ICT in Developing Regions) ===
The Swedish Program for ICT in Developing Regions is a resource center for ICT for Development. A spider was established in 2004 and is primarily financed by the Swedish International Development Cooperation (Sida), with complementary funding from Stockholm University. The center is administered by the Department of Computer and Systems Sciences (DSV) at Stockholm University.

=== NetHope ===
NetHope, Inc., founded in 2001, is a consortium of 35 international non-governmental organizations (NGOs) that specializes in improving IT connectivity among humanitarian organizations in developing countries and areas affected by the disaster. The organization has partnerships with Microsoft, Cisco Systems, Intel, and Accenture. Its humanitarian development, emergency response, and conservation programs are in place in 180 countries worldwide.

=== Sarvodaya-Fusion ===
Sarvodaya-Fusion is a social enterprise specializing in ICT4D in Sri Lanka. The organisation collaborates with government, corporate partners and civil society organisations with the aim of the e-empowerment of rural communities. As a specialized branch of the Sarvodaya Shramadana Movement, it has pioneered the use of rural telecentres to provide a sustainable education model in over one hundred locations across the island called Fusion Education. In 2007 Sarvodaya-Fusion introduced the first ever Mobile4Development application for agriculture through the SMS trading service FarmerNet. In 2011, it launched the SmartVillage project that integrated Android Smartphone technology and social networking as a tool for community development.

SOS Children's Villages

SOS children's villages have several ICT4D initiatives in her different programs; in Kenya, SOS implements a literacy program dubbed OSL(Open space literacy), in this, children are given an opportunity to interact with digital technologies and learn literacy through digital educational contents. , for more information, follow the following link www.sos-childrensvillages.org

=== TechChange ===
TechChange: The Institute of Technology and Social Change is a US-based social enterprise that delivers online certificate courses and workshops in topics related to ICT4D such as technology for emergency management, mobile phones for international development, mHealth, social media for social change, citizen journalism, participatory mapping social entrepreneurship, digital organizing, open government, intrapreneurship and more.

=== The Development CAFE (DevCAFE) ===
The Development CAFE or DevCAFE, is a non-profit research, monitoring, evaluation and technology think tank founded in 2001. It was primarily founded to bridge the gap between information technology capabilities and international development. It mainly focuses on empowering global south organisations, government bodies and grassroots NGOs in harnessing technology, MEL and Research Capacity. Their major development projects are focused in SE Asia and Indo pacfici through their Indonesia country office that was registered in 2017. They offer innovative e learning from their signature e learning platform E Dev

=== Open Function (OpenFn) ===
Open Function works with NGOs (such as UNICEF) and governments to scale public health and humanitarian programs via data integration, interoperability, and automation. Their integration-platform-as-a-service is used to connect such tools as DHIS2, CommCare, and ODK.

=== ICT4D.at ===
The Austrian Network for Information and Communication Technologies for Development (ICT4D.at) was founded in Vienna in the year of 2008. ICT4D.at is a non-profit and non-governmental organization. The association is a network of people who engage themselves into the context of ICT4D. Several small and large scale projects have been implemented over the last decade and ICT4D.at is part of a larger network of organizations and research facilities.

== Engaged in ICT4Dev ==
=== Bangladesh Institute of ICT in Development (BIID) ===
BIID is a Bangladesh-based inclusive business initiative engaged in developing ICT enabled products and services to support private and public (Government and NGO) initiatives targeted for the BoP (Base of the Pyramid) segment in particular and citizens in general in providing them with access to ICTs and ICT enabled information and services. BIID envisions wide range of opportunities in the ICT4D sector in developing countries.

However, there exists no impact assessment report that might claim its success in the areas it is involved, reflecting on the experiences of its target beneficiaries.

=== Microsoft ===
Microsoft started to offer special developing world Windows version dubbed "Starter edition" since Windows XP, which is cheaper than other editions, has limited application functions, network connectivity and is restricted to low-end hardware.

Microsoft has established a presence in 13 countries, donated Windows for thousands of school computers, and funded programs for entrepreneurs and young people.[28][29] The company also runs an ICT4Dev program called "Unlimited Potential".

=== MIT ===
At the Massachusetts Institute of Technology, the IMARA organization (from Swahili word for "power") sponsors a variety of outreach programs which bridge the Global Digital Divide. Its aim is to find and implement long-term, sustainable solutions which will increase the availability of educational technology and resources to domestic and international communities. These projects are run under the aegis of the MIT Computer Science and Artificial Intelligence Laboratory (CSAIL) and staffed by MIT volunteers who give training, installed and donated computer setups in greater Boston, Massachusetts, Kenya, Indian reservations the American Southwest such as the Navajo Nation, the Middle East, and Fiji Islands. The CommuniTech project strives to empower underserved communities through sustainable technology and education.

The institute also runs the Entrepreneurial Programming and Research on Mobiles and Africa Information Technology Initiative which focus on ICT4Dev.

== Unclassified ICT4Dev organizations ==
- TechChange delivers online certificate courses on ICT4D topics such as mHealth, tech for emergency management, mobile money, social media for social change, and more.
- United Villages uses a Wi-Fi-based network for rural Internet delivery in India.
- Geekcorps offers education systems that draw on information technology.
- The "Deutsche Gesellschaft für Internationale Zusammenarbeit GmbH [until 2011: Inwent – Capacity Building International, now part of GIZ] through its it@inwent programmes, strengthens IT sectors in Africa and Asia, fosters key innovations in Information and Communication Technologies (ICTs) for economic development, and supports its partners to use ICTs as enabling tools for poverty reduction. A focus is on "Business Models in Free and Open Source Software in Developing countries".
- The Technical Centre for Agricultural and Rural Cooperation ACP-EU (CTA) supports the dissemination of ICT4Dev in ACP countries.
- The World Wide Web Consortium Interest Group on the Mobile Web for Social Development (MW4D) explores how to use the potential of Information Communication Technology (ICT) on mobile phones as a solution to bridge the digital divide and provide minimal services (health, education, governance, business, etc.) to rural communities and under-privileged populations of developing countries.
- Information and Communication Technology Agency of Sri Lanka (ICTA)
- PlayPower
- SITIA International ICT non-profit supporting public health in the developing world.
- Besipae is an NGO based in East Nusa Tenggara province in Indonesia. It supports poverty alleviation in rural communities by disseminating knowledge through ICT approaches.

== See also ==
- Computer technology for developing areas § List of known major providers and charities (a sub-article of Information and communication technologies for development)
