= Asia Source =

Free and open-source software event series

Asia Source was an event series that promoted and coordinated the use of free and open-source software (FOSS) in Asia. It took place three times: the first event was hosted in Bangalore, India, in 2005, the second in Sukabumi in West Java, Indonesia, in January 2007. The third event was held in Silang, Cavite in the Philippines in 2009.

Asia Source gathered FOSS experts and advocates from all over Asia, mostly IT professionals, trainers and FOSS practitioners from non-government organizations (NGOs), IT training institutes and small and medium enterprises (SMEs).

== Organisers ==
The series of Asia Source events was organised by UNDP APDIP via International Open Source Network (IOSN), Inwent, Tactical Technology Collective, Aspiration, Hivos, ICT watch, IDRC and the Centre for Internet and Society, India. IOSN is an initiative of the UNDP Asia-Pacific Development Information Programme.

The Asia Source event series is based on the source camp template of the Tactical Technology Collective, an international nongovernmental organization that trains rights advocates to deploy information and communications technologies.

== Goals ==
The goal of the event was to motivate and facilitate the adoption of open-source software as tools, and also as a mind-set and attitude that promotes the use of open-source software for communities to minimize the digital divide. This event aimed to build skills and networks amongst the professionals working at local level across Asia by providing a range of hands-on and practical sessions in the usage of FOSS.

== Asia Source 2 ==
=== Participants ===
The second event, Asia Source II, took place over nine days, with over 130 participants from 27 countries, including Iran, Bangladesh, India, Pakistan, Nepal, Sri Lanka, Mongolia, Egypt, England, United States of America, Canada, Australia, Netherlands, Germany, Poland, Greece, Malaysia, Thailand, Cambodia, Laos, Vietnam, The Philippines, Timor Leste and Indonesia.

Participants were grouped into four tracks which are 1. Open publishing and broadcasting, 2. Alternative hardware and access, 3. Migrating to FOSS, and 4. Information management.

=== Camp structure ===
This event was a source camp style, in which the participants were gathered in a localized resort which include a main hall, track rooms and surrounded by bungalows. Each day started with a morning circle that assemble all participants in the main hall. Except for day one, the morning circle has report back sessions of the previous day training.

After the short morning circle the participants were separated according to their appointed track to follow the mandatory materials until noon.

After breaking for lunch, the afternoon continued with sessions contributed by the participants. Each participant was required to propose and schedule a short session describing his/her specialty or any related topic of interest. There were skill shares, lightning talks (speed geekings), or any other Birds of a Feather style sessions.

Each day ended up with a free evening of entertainment. There were cultural dances, movie night, karaoke night, game night and a special bazaar evening for the whole party.

=== Topics ===
Topics of the event included ease of use of FOSS, gender issue, and reach out with FOSS. More on social justice and civic rights issues like human rights, ethnic minorities, women/children, disabled, anti-corruption, public health and environment were also mentioned. A session on FOSS Disaster Management System was also presented by a team from Sri Lanka for solution in time of disasters.

== Asia Source 3 ==
Asia Source 3 gathered 150 representatives in Silang, Cavite in the Philippines from 7 to 12 November 2009 to discuss regional developments in open source. *

Asian countries represented in Asia Source 3 include Bangladesh, Burma, Cambodia, China, India, Indonesia, Kyrgyzstan, Laos, Mongolia, Pakistan, Philippines, Sri Lanka, Thailand, Timor Leste, Vietnam.

== Legacy ==
Mekong ICT Camp, a version of Source Camp for Greater Mekong Subregion, is inspired by Asia Source, as described by its founder, Klaikong Vaidhyakarn, who attended Asia Source I and Asia Source II. The first Mekong ICT Camp was held in February 2008 at Pattaya city of Thailand. It was organized by Thai Fund Foundation with collaborations and supports from local and international partners, including Thai Volunteer Service and Kuala Lumpur-based Southeast Asian Center for e-Media., following Source Camps Replication Materials published by Tactical Tech Collective. Mekong ICT Camp is still actively organized by partners in the region. Mekong ICT Camp 2010 was held in Chiang Mai, 2013 in Cha-am, 2015 in Pattaya, and 2017 in Siem Reap.
