= Knowledge and News Network =

Knowledge and News Network (KNN)
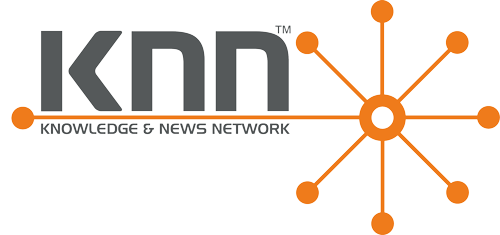
- Founded: 25 July 2013
- Headquarters: New Delhi, India
- Number of locations: 3
- Website: www.knnindia.co.in

Knowledge & News Network (KNN) is a community-owned not-for-profit alternative media platform established to address the problems of Indian MSMEs arising from gaps in information and knowledge flows. It is promoted by GIZ-German Agency for International Cooperation and the Federation of Indian Micro and Small & Medium Enterprises (FISME) under the aegis of an umbrella bilateral development programme jointly supported by Government of Federal Republic of Germany and Government of India.

KNN provides news and information to the mainstream media – both print and electronic, fed through a national network of over 156 KNN member industry associations. and 110 institutions.

The Micro, small and Medium Enterprises. (MSME) are considered the back bone of the Indian economy. Over 40 million in number, cumulatively they are the second largest employer after agriculture and contribute over 35% to exports and almost 40% to industrial production. However, the MSME sector is largely unorganized and operates in informal setting. Due to their unorganized nature, their views and news seldom reach to policy makers. This results in a structural gap in information-feedback-loop critical for formulation of demand driven policies and schemes. While MSMEs rightly complain about bad policies, the policy makers do not have sufficient information to frame right response. KNN aims to enable two-way flow of information from MSMEs to both policy makers and institutions and vice versa.

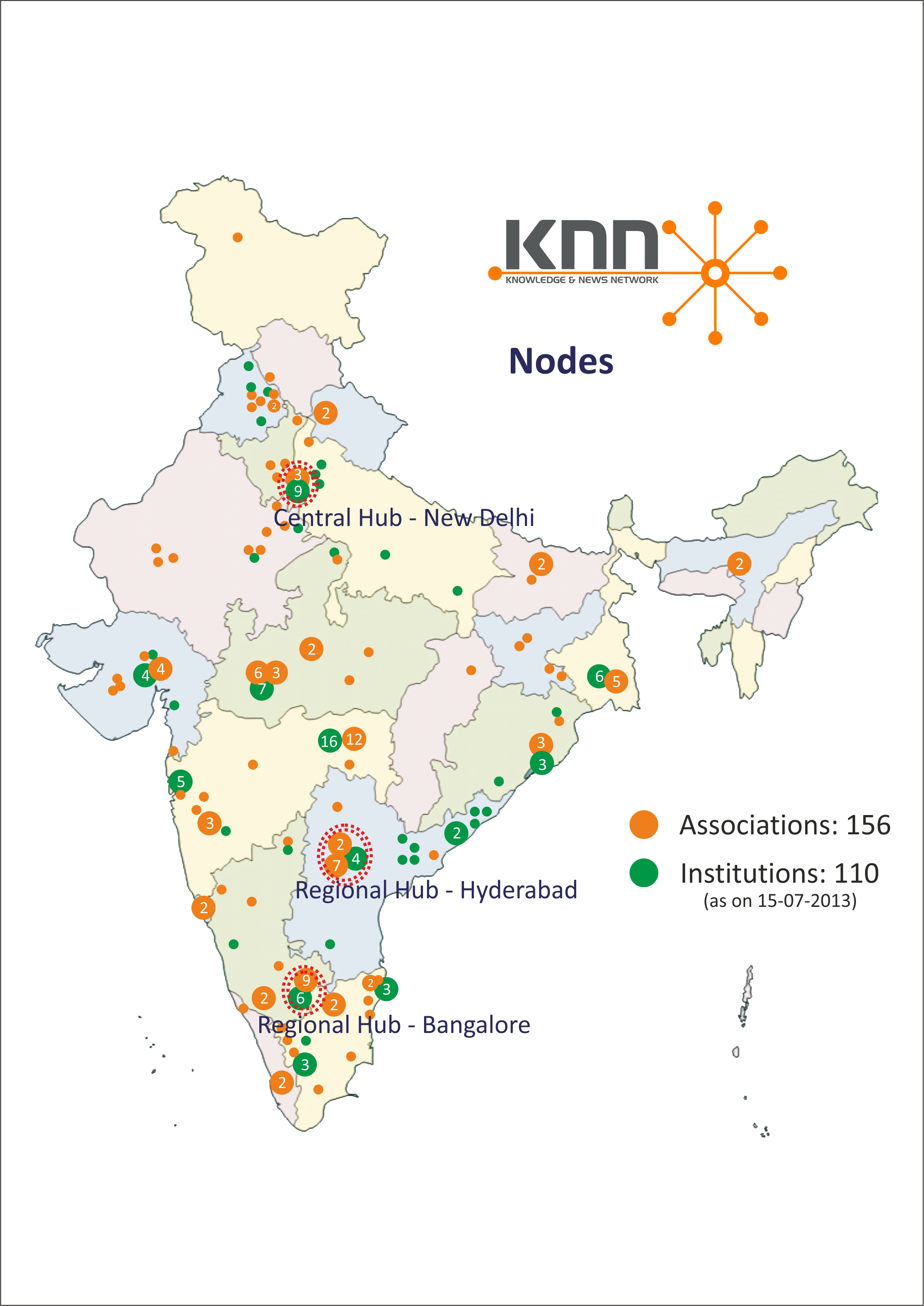
Knowledge and News Network (KNN) Nodes Map

== Operating Architecture ==
KNN's back-end is based on an architecture comprising a central hub, bureau, and studio in New Delhi, with regional hubs in Bangalore and Hyderabad connected via video-conferencing. The network includes a team of journalists and approximately 260 nodes consisting of MSME associations and institutions, including research and development facilities, engineering colleges, and management institutes. These nodes provide text and video reports which are uploaded following a validation process.

== History ==
Knowledge & News Network (KNN) was conceived and implemented through 2012-13 by FISME with support of GIZ. KNN became operational on 25 July 2013. It was flagged off by Union Minister of Micro Small and Medium Enterprises Mr. K.H. Muniyappa in New Delhi in presence of senior officials of the Ministry Mr. Madhav Lal and Additional Secretary and Development Commissioner Mr. Amarendra Sinha. Also present during the occasion of were CEO of Prasar Bharati Mr. Jawhar Sircar, Mr. Manfred Haebig, Director, Private, Sector Development, GIZ India and President FISME Mr. D. Gandhikumar.

Knowledge & News Network (KNN) launched by MSME Minister

== Additional sources ==
- Knowledge & News Network (KNN) launched by MSME Minister (25 July 2013) FISME.
- MSME Ministry in favour of raising investment cap for SMEs (26 July 2013)The Economic Times.
- Media service for MSME Knowledge & News Network launch (27 July 2013) Indian Muslim observer.
- Knowledge and News Network celebrates the MSME sector (10 August 2013) NDTV Profit.
- KNN: FISME initiative to highlight SME challenges (8 July 2013) Support Biz.
- Policy Scan Govt. Policy, Business Procedures & Regulations (25 July 2013) Elcina.
