= Germany–Myanmar relations =

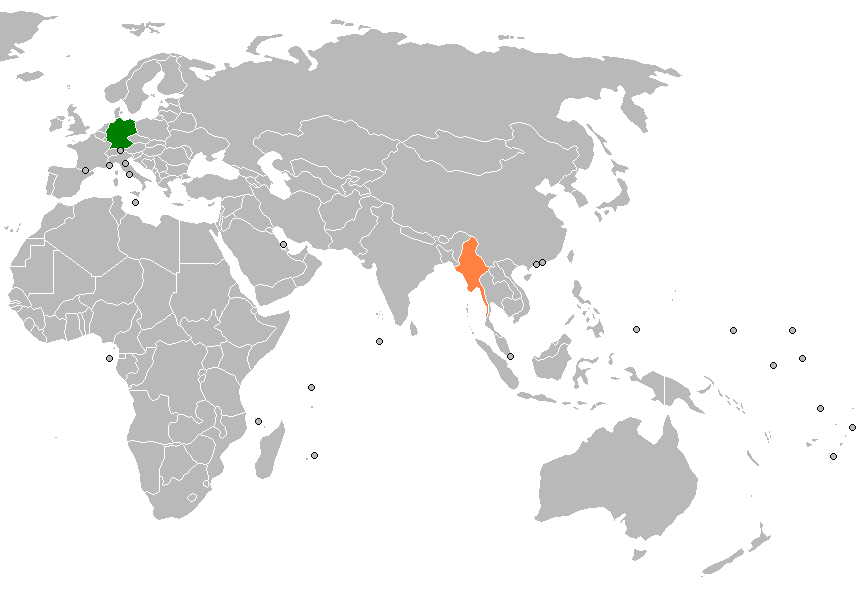

- Germany: Myanmar

In 2014, the Federal Republic of Germany and the Republic of the Union of Myanmar (before 1989: Union of Burma) celebrated the 60th anniversary of Germany–Myanmar relations.

== Relations before 1988 ==
From 1954 to 1988, Germany and Myanmar maintained a close relationship that was largely supported by Germany's development policy.

=== Political relations ===
The first diplomatic relations between the Federal Republic of Germany and the Union of Burma began in 1952, based in part on the initiative of various representatives of German business, including Krupp, AEG, Siemens, and the Berli Jucker trading house in Bangkok, who had been pushing for a diplomatic mission since the early 1950s. In addition, the FRG wanted to pre-empt the GDR, which had already opened its first trade mission in 1954, to contain its influence on Burma and prevent its recognition. Diplomatic relations between the FRG and Burma were established that same year. In 1955, the Federal Republic established a legation in Rangoon. It was not until much later, in 1973, that the GDR also established a diplomatic mission.

The Hallstein Doctrine of the FRG was not consistently implemented in the case of Burma. The German government was more concerned with keeping communism in check. Military buildup to fend off communist insurgencies received full support. Relations were built on strong cooperation with the Burmese military to secure influence. No emphasis was placed on issues that are essential from today's perspective, such as human rights or democracy. Burma never addressed the "German Question" and maintained bilateral relations with both the FRG and the GDR. Burma sided with the GDR through political proximity, but at the same time was dependent on development aid from the FRG. The high point of German-Burmese relations was represented by the state visits of German President Richard von Weizsäcker to Burma in February 1986 and Burmese President San Yu to Germany in October 1987.

=== Development aid ===
The FRG launched development assistance programs shortly after establishing diplomatic relations with Burma. Although Germany was the second largest donor nation behind Japan and the most important Western European development partner for Burma, providing DM 1.15 billion between 1956 and 1988, the partnership was less significant from a German perspective. The approach to development assistance at the time was significantly different from that practiced today. Instead of providing humanitarian and grassroots aid through NGOs, Germany focused on technical projects and cooperation. A large part of the development aid benefited projects of the German Agency for Technical Cooperation and the Federal Ministry for Economic Cooperation and Development. In addition, German experts accompanied technical projects in an advisory capacity. In addition to development aid and cooperation in the technical and academic fields, the aid also included loans to the Burmese state. Burmese officials and military personnel also repeatedly visited the Federal Republic for training purposes. Furthermore, Germany awarded scholarships to Burmese students in Germany. The Burmese government, however, tried to stop this by imposing punitive fines and revocation of citizenship upon completion of studies abroad.

=== Fritz Werner GmbH ===
A special role in the bilateral relationship was played by the Fritz Werner GmbH company from Geisenheim, which specialized primarily in industrial plants for the production of armaments. It was state-owned from 1954 to 1990 and consequently enjoyed full support from the authorities in doing business with Myanmar. Its discreet handling of the state's internal affairs and reliability helped the company to gain a foothold in Burma. The management of Fritz-Werner GmbH had excellent relations with the military and the government, especially with General Ne Win, and systematically built on these over the years. By 1988, 600-700 young military officers and engineers had been trained in the GmbH's workshops in Berlin and Geisenheim. Among the participants in the training project were Maung Maung Kha, who later became prime minister, and U Maung Cho, the minister responsible for the defense industry. The relationship went so far that the head of Fritz-Werner GmbH had a more privileged position than the German Embassy in Rangoon and acted as a mediator in most bilateral projects and agreements. In total, Fritz-Werner GmbH advised on 22 of its own and another five external projects in Burma until 1988. The close relationship enabled Fritz-Werner GmbH to be the only company allowed to invest in Burma during the Ne Win era, when foreign companies were only allowed to invest in the country in partnership with the state. However, its business in Burma has been criticized for playing a major role in the military's rise to power and the bloody suppression of pro-democracy protests in August 1988. State-owned Fritz-Werner GmbH and the government were suspected of involvement in the events and of supplying the military with armaments. The German government denied any knowledge of this.

== Relations from 1988 to 2012 ==
German-Myanmar relations from 1988 to 2012 were characterized by stagnation.

=== The consequences of the 1988 coup ===
After the mass demonstrations in Burma in August 1988 and the coup on September 18 of the same year, the strategy of German foreign policy toward the country changed abruptly. While the funds for development aid still amounted to 31.7 million USD in 1988, ten projects worth 50 million DM were already shut down in December 1988 and the majority of the experts in the country were ordered back to Germany. Only three experts remained in the country to finish projects that had been started. These radical measures can be described as a "negative pedant to the non-reaction before 1988, as the Federal Republic had turned a blind eye to the dictatorial features of Ne Win's government." The new strategy had a negative impact on Germany's foreign policy. The new strategy resulted in Germany losing its privileged position and all networks in the country.

=== Sanctions of the EU and Germany ===
In 1990, the EU also reacted with its first sanctions. It imposed an arms embargo on Myanmar and withdrew all military attachés. It also suspended development cooperation. Only humanitarian aid was still permitted at this time. The Maastricht Treaty (1992) established the goal of a "common foreign policy" for the first time. The European Union could now act as such on the international stage. It could express its position on armed conflicts, on human rights issues, or on other topics. The treaty entered into force in 1993. Through the Common Foreign and Security Policy (CFSP), the interests of individual countries moved into the background. The FRG promoted the establishment of the CFSP, but left decision-making to Northern European countries, such as the Netherlands, UK, Denmark, and Ireland, which advocated tightening sanctions against Myanmar. In the wake of the death of Danish diplomat James Leander Nichols in a burmese prison in 1996, the EU issued its first unified statement on Myanmar and committed all EU states to base their foreign policy actions on it. A visa ban was imposed on members of the regime as well as their families. In the following years, further EU sanctions were gradually imposed; for example, the visa ban was extended to tourists in 1997. In 1998, the EU imposed economic sanctions for the first time in history by revoking Myanmar's Generalized System of Preferences rights. In 1999, the Federal Republic used its EU presidency to initiate meetings with the EU Troika and Myanmar's military government in July 1999 and April 2000. Despite repeated multinational talks with representatives of the EU and Myanmar as well as ASEAN states, sanctions were extended in 2003. When Khin Nyunt and a considerable part of the state apparatus were removed from office in 2004, the EU lost its interlocutors within the military regime. The turning point came in 2011. In response to the first free elections since 1988, EU sanctions were initially suspended for a year and then lifted altogether in 2012, with the exception of the arms embargo. Although the Federal Republic aligned itself with the EU's strategy toward Myanmar on the basis of the CFSP throughout the period from 1993 to 2011, it did attempt to intervene in some ways. For example, it was not entirely convinced that the sanctions imposed by the EU would have the desired effect. During the period, Germany supported United Nations aid projects to combat drugs abuse, and measures relating to infrastructure. Bilateral relations in the area of education continued to a limited extent. Germany awarded approximately 40-50 scholarships to Myanmar each year.

== Relations since 2012 ==
There have been efforts to revive the partnership since 2012, after it was restricted for several years by EU sanctions.

=== Rising economic ties ===
From February 9 to 12, 2014, Joachim Gauck became the first German president to visit Myanmar since 1986. Among other things, Gauck met with President Thein Sein and opposition leader Aung San Suu Kyi. During the German president's visit, an agreement regarding Myanmar's old debts was also signed. "The bilateral agreement settles the debts in arrears as of the end of 2012, amounting to about 1.1 billion euros, of which 50 percent will be forgiven. The remaining 50 percent, or about 542 million euros, will be deferred and is to be repaid between 2020 and 2027." The background to this agreement was the Paris Club's decision on the multilateral debt settlement in January 2013.

Since 2011, trade between Germany and Myanmar has been slowly picking up. Thus, there is a high demand for German products, especially in the field of mechanical engineering, electrical engineering, as well as chemical products and pharmaceuticals. Germany imports mainly garments and foodstuffs; in addition, imports of raw materials, such as wood, as well as processed gemstones are becoming increasingly important for foreign trade statistics. More and more large, German companies are discovering the Myanmar market for themselves, with Henkel, the drug manufacturer Stada, and Adidas, among others, producing in Myanmar as of 2014.

=== Development aid ===
During his visit in February 2012, the then Federal Minister Dirk Niebel advocated promoting sustainable economic development. German involvement in this area, represented by GIZ, focuses primarily on promoting vocational training, as Germany's dual education system is a perfect template. It also supports projects to further develop the private and financial sectors Non-governmental organizations from Germany are also involved in areas such as humanitarian aid, poverty alleviation, curbing drug cultivation, and the health sector.

In 2020, Germany again suspended its development aid to the country. After the 2021 Myanmar coup d'état relations worsened further.

== German institutions in Myanmar ==
- German Embassy in Rangoon (1954)
- Delegate Office of the German Economy, AHK Myanmar (2013)
- Goethe-Institut in Rangoon (2014 reopended)
- German-Myanmar Business Chamber (2015)

== Migration ==
With officially registered 1402 Burmese (2013), Germany is the second largest European country after the United Kingdom for migrants from Myanmar.

== Literature ==
- Hans-Bernd Zöllner: Birma zwischen „Unabhängigkeit Zuerst-Unabhängigkeit Zuletzt“. LIT-Verlag, Hamburg 2000, ISBN 3-8258-4360-2.
- Michael von Hauff: Economic and Social Development in Burma/Myanmar, The Relevance of Reforms. Metropolis-Verlag, Marburg 2007, ISBN 978-3-89518-635-6.
- Lukas Brandau: EU-Sanktionen: das Beispiel Myanmar. Abera, 2010, ISBN 978-3-934376-91-5.
