= Heinz Nixdorf Programm =

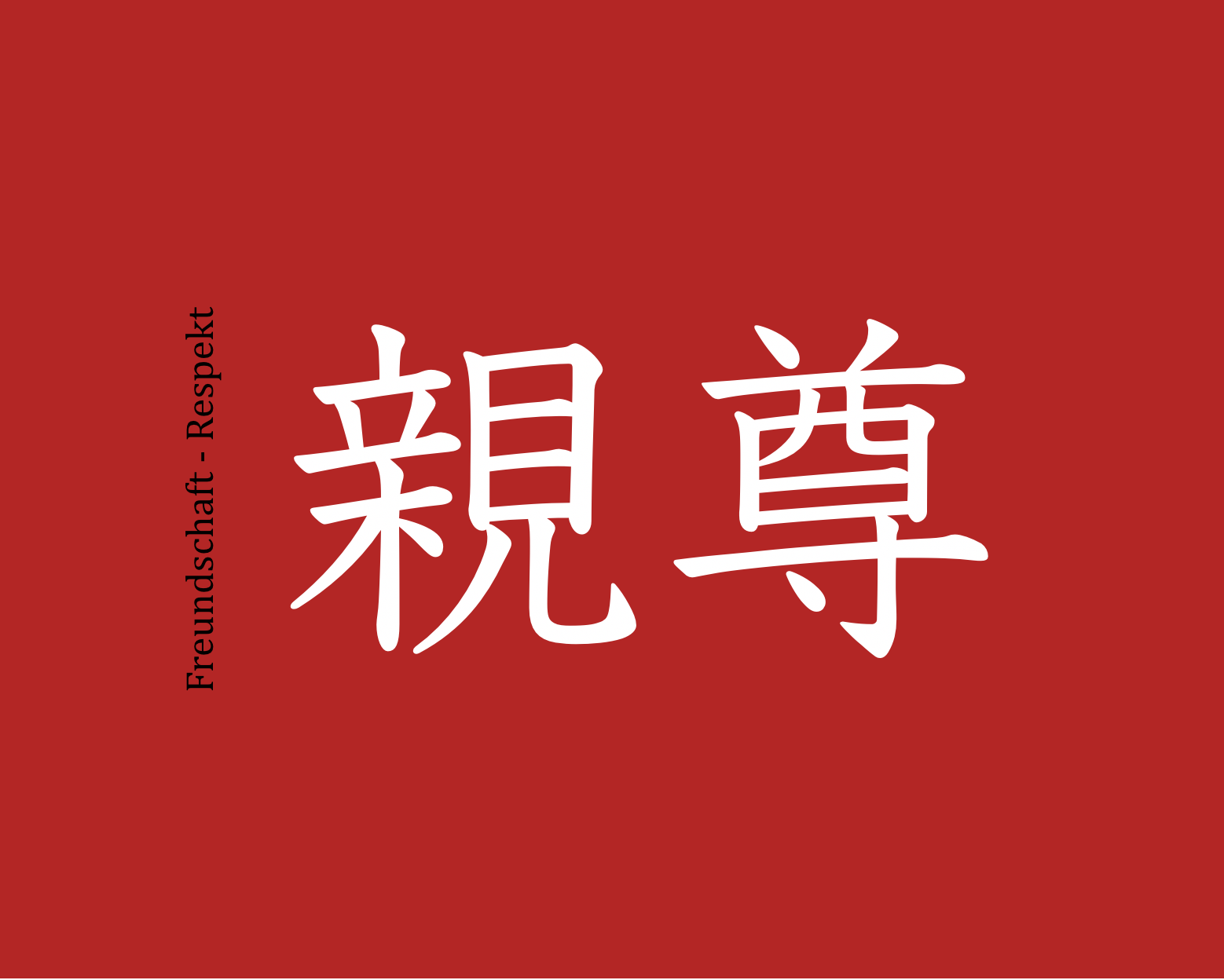
Logo of the Heinz Nixdorf Program, a program to promote Asia-Pacific related work experience for young aspiring managers holding German citizenship

The Heinz Nixdorf Program is a scholarship program to promote Asia-Pacific related work experience for young aspiring managers holding German citizenship. The program is funded by the Heinz Nixdorf Stiftung.

== History ==
In spirit of the entrepreneur Heinz Nixdorf (1925 – 1986), the Heinz Nixdorf Foundation set its goal to strengthen creativity and entrepreneurship of the young generation and allow it to gain market knowledge of the Asia-Pacific region. This is how the Heinz Nixdorf Program came into existence with the aim to promote Asia-Pacific related work experience for young aspiring managers holding German citizenship, managed by the Deutschen Gesellschaft für Internationale Zusammenarbeit (GIZ) GmbH.

== Target and Scope of the Program ==
The Heinz Nixdorf Program, which promotes Asia-Pacific related work experience for young aspiring managers with German citizenship, organizes internships of four to six months length in the following eight Asian countries.

- People's Republic of China (PRC)
- India
- Indonesia
- Japan
- Malaysia
- South Korea
- Taiwan
- Vietnam

The scholars gain Asian market knowledge by way of practical work experience in local enterprises. The program provides insights into the local economy and working environment to young and aspiring managers, which would otherwise be hard to obtain.

== Organization ==
In 1994, when the program was initiated, the Carl-Duisberg Gesellschaft e.V. took on the implementation of the program. In 2002, the responsibilities to manage the program were transferred to Internationale Weiterbildung und Entwicklung gGmbH (InWEnt) as part of a merger with Deutschen Stiftung für internationale Entwicklung (DSE). The Internationale Weiterbildung und Entwicklung gGmbH (InWEnt) merged again and contributed the Heinz Nixdorf Program into the Deutsche Gesellschaft für Internationale Zusammenarbeit (GIZ) GmbH.

== Target Group ==
The Heinz Nixdorf Program mainly targets young professionals and graduates of business and technical majors that hold German citizenship. High potential undergraduates are also taken into consideration as long as they earn at least one academic degree prior to their departure to their host country. In general, the applicants are younger than thirty years, have at least 6 months of practical work experience and a proof of good English language skills (TOEFL, IELTS or Cambridge Certificate).

Besides the formal academic qualification, the program requires social competence to integrate, tolerance, self-reliance, a strong sense of responsibility and proactive attitude from each applicant.

The selection process of the candidates takes place in several stages and reviews their professional expertise, motivation and social competence.

== Stages of the Program ==
Once an applicant is accepted to the program, the scholar proceeds with the following stages:

- Introduction of the program and a seminar to create intercultural awareness (combined with the evaluation event for returning participants)
- Preparation seminar to learn more about the host country
- Up to two months of intensive language training in Germany
- Up to two months of intensive language training in the host country
- Four to six months of practical work in a local enterprise in Asia
- Progress reporting of each individual to the GIZ in conjunction with an evaluation seminar (combined with the new batch of candidates preparing for their departure)

The preparation and aftercare of the program comprises the following organizational and financial support provided by the GIZ:

- Counseling, preparation, management of the program as well as evaluation with partners in Germany and in the host countries
- Management and funding of the seminars and language courses as well as assistance in obtaining visa
- Monthly scholarship to cover living expenses in the host country
- Forum of the Heinz Nixdorf scholars - a virtual meeting point on the internet for exchange of experience, job openings etc.
- Networking with scholars and alumni on the internet and organized reunions

== Overview ==
Since 1994, an average of 35 scholars take part in the program across eight Asian countries each year. The GIZ instructed a research institute to analyze the results after twenty years of existence of the Heinz Nixdorf Program. As a conclusion the program fully meets its purpose.
