= SnooCODE =

Ghanaian British technology company

- Industry: Technology company
- Founded: 2011; 15 years ago
- Headquarters: Accra, Ghana
- Key people: Sesinam Dagadu (Founder and Chief Executive Officer)
- Products: location-based addressing system, logistics, e-Commerce, emergency services etc.
- Website: snoocode.com

SnooCODE is a Ghanaian British technology company that provides location-based solutions to power core citizen centric services like banking, logistics, e-Commerce, and emergency Services in the developing and developed world.

== History ==
SnooCODE digital addressing system was launched in 2011 by Sesinam Dagadu who is the current CEO and Founder of the company. In 2012, it earned Prior Art as the first postal code system and method for smartphones and other mobile devices.

SnooCODE was formally registered as a company in 2014. Its implemented as Liberia’s national addressing system through a Public–Private partnership agreement with Liberia’s Ministry of Posts & Telecommunications.

In a collaboration with the Vodafone Ghana Foundation and the Ghana National Ambulance Service (GNAS), launched a variant of the SnooCODE system called SnooCODE RED to accurately locate victims in emergency situations.

In December 2023 the Deutsche Gesellschaft für Internationale Zusammenarbeit (GIZ) GmbH and SnooCODE Limited signed an agreement to collaborate on a project aimed at reducing the environmental impact of single-use packaging from e-commerce deliveries in Ghana. They will use their technology to optimize delivery routes ensuring the travel distances for delivery men significantly reduces which in effect reduces the carbon footprints of this delivery operations.
