= Dirk Niebel =

German politician (born 1963)

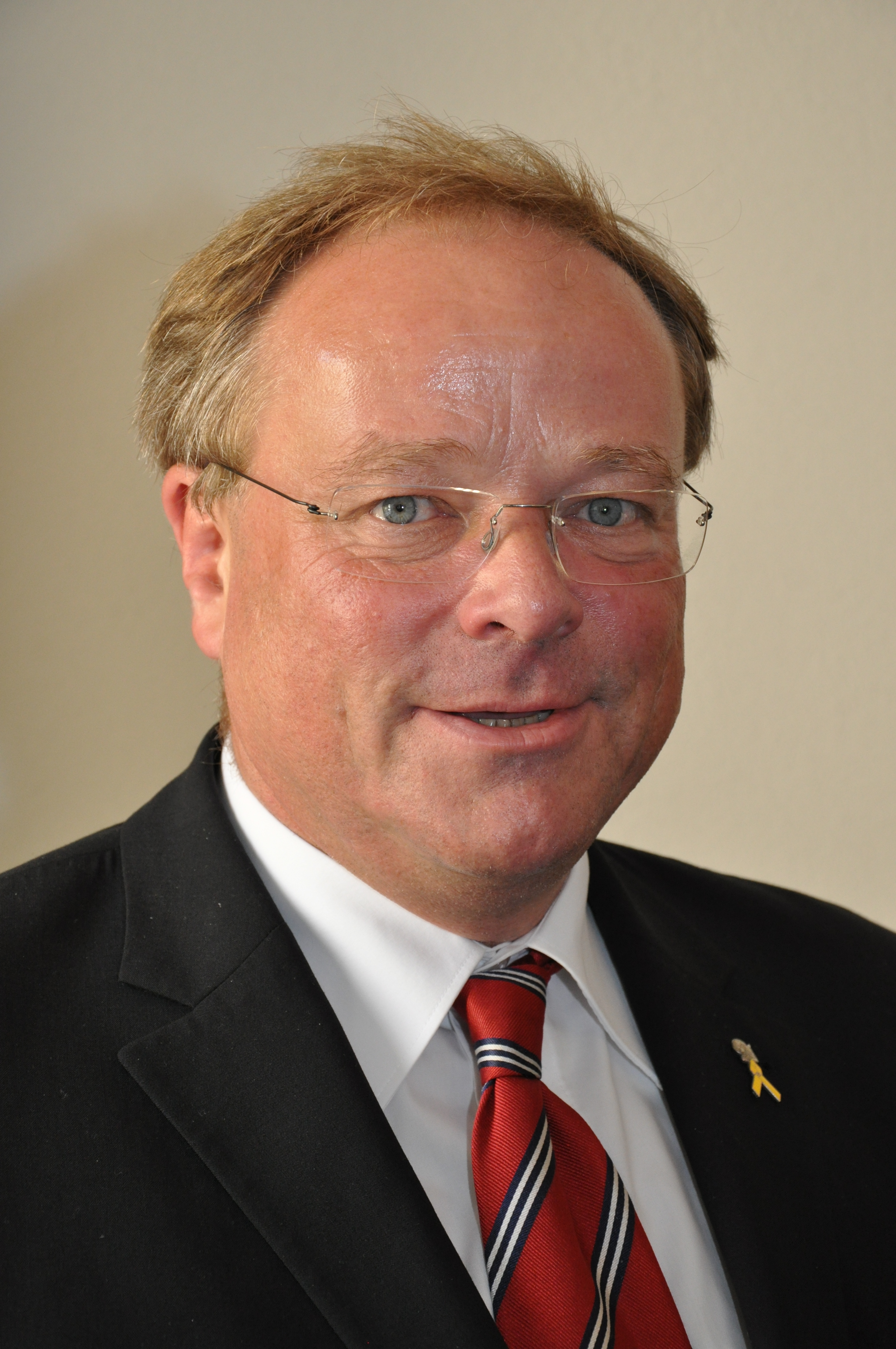

Federal Minister of Economic Cooperation and Development
- In office 28 October 2009 – 17 December 2013
- Chancellor: Angela Merkel
- Preceded by: Heidemarie Wieczorek-Zeul
- Succeeded by: Gerd Müller

Personal details
- Born: 29 March 1963 (age 63) Hamburg, West Germany
- Party: Free Democratic
- Website: dirk-niebel.de

Dirk Niebel (German pronunciation: [ˈdɪʁk ˈniːbl̩]; born 29 March 1963) is a German politician. From 2009 to 2013, he served as Federal Minister of Economic Cooperation and Development. From 2005 to 2009, he was secretary general of the FDP.

== Early life and career ==
Niebel was born in Hamburg on 29 March 1963. After his Fachhochschulreife (college entrance qualification) in 1983, Niebel lived for one year in a Kibbutz in Israel. Later he served for eight years as an airborne infantry noncommissioned officer in the Bundeswehr in Calw. He then studied at the German College of Public Administration in Mannheim and finished his studies in 1993 as Diplom-Verwaltungswirt (similar to a Master of Public Administration degree). In 1982, he spent a summer in the kibbutz Kfar Giladi.

From 1993 to 1998, Niebel worked at an employment bureau in Sinsheim, a part of the Federal Employment Office of Heidelberg.

Niebel is married and has three sons.

== Political career ==
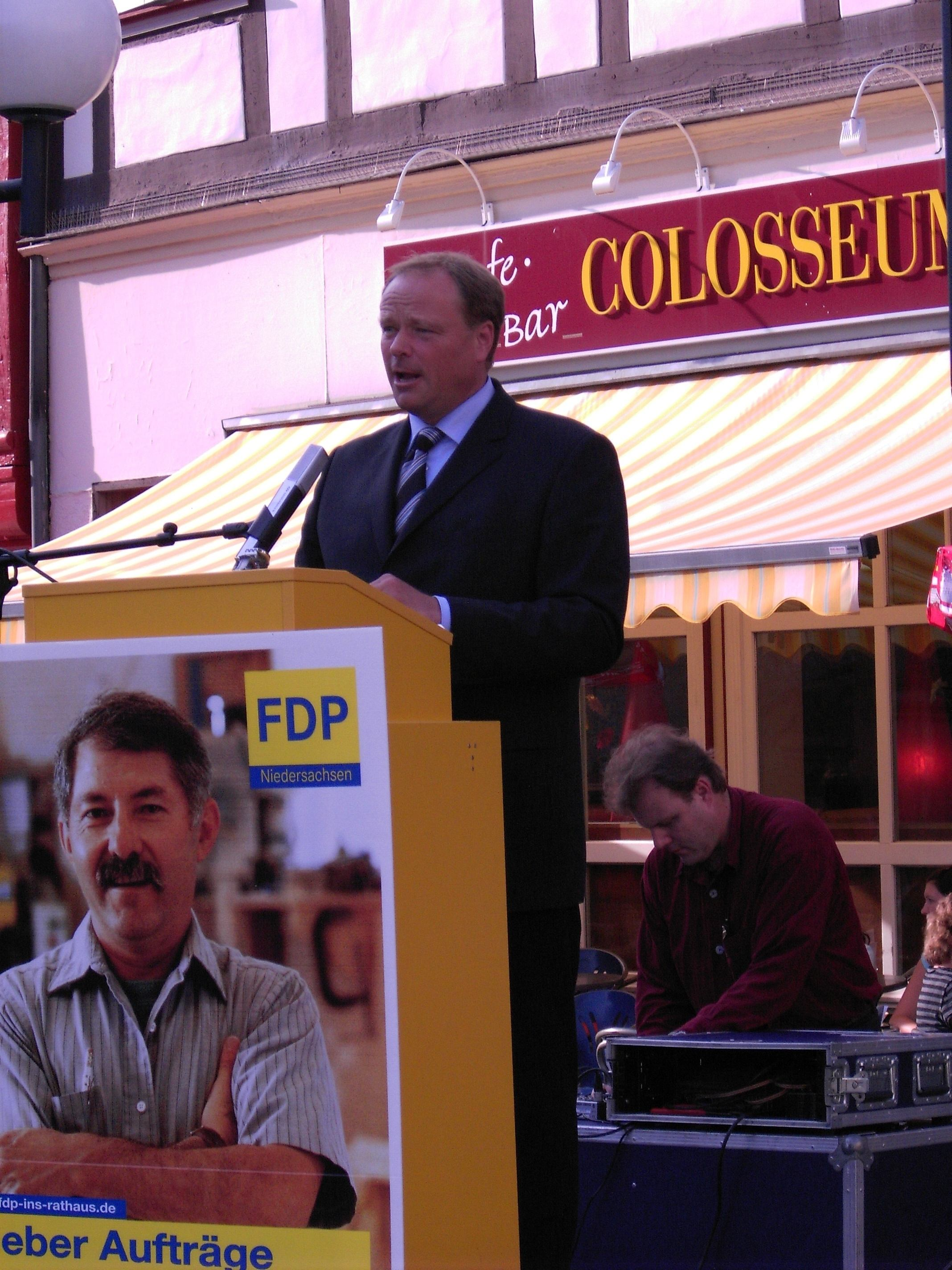
Niebel speaking in Göttingen

In 1977, Niebel joined the Junge Union, and in 1979, the CDU. He left both in 1981.

In 1990, he joined the FDP and was co-founder of the Heidelberg division of the Junge Liberale. Since 2003 Niebel has been a member of the Federal Board of the FDP and of the curatorship of the Friedrich Naumann Foundation. On 5 May 2005, the Federal Board elected him secretary general of the FDP with 92.4 percent of the votes.

=== Member of the Bundestag, 1998–2013 ===
Niebel was first elected a member of the Bundestag in the 1998 elections. From 2002 to 2005, he was chairman of the State group of Baden-Württemberg in the parliamentary group of the FDP. From 1998, he served as speaker of the FDP parliamentary group on labor policy. In addition to this, Niebel was a member of the group of German-Israeli parliament members from 1998. At the 2009 election, he stood unsuccessfully in the single member constituency of Heidelberg, but was elected from the land list.

In the negotiations to form a coalition government of the CDU and the FDP following the 2009 federal elections, Niebel led the FDP delegation in the working group on labour and social affairs; his counterpart of the CDU was Ronald Pofalla.

From 2000 to 2010, Niebel served as the vice president of the Deutsch-Israelische Gesellschaft (German Israeli Society).

=== Federal Minister of Economic Cooperation and Development, 2009–2013 ===
In 2009, Niebel was appointed Federal Minister of Economic Cooperation and Development in the second government of Chancellor Angela Merkel. His party ally Guido Westerwelle took over the office of Foreign Minister. During their time in office, German official development assistance came to 10.83 billion euros by 2013, making the country the world's third largest donor in 2012 and 2013.

When he entered office, he said the ministry is "not a world social office" (Weltsozialamt), a statement which has been criticized by many organizations. In his capacity as minister, Niebel served as Member of the Broadcasting Board of Deutsche Welle; as Member of Board of Supervisory Directors of KfW; and as Member of the Board of Governors of the World Bank. Early in his tenure, he led efforts for a structural reform of German development assistance. By 2011, the German government established the aid agency Deutsche Gesellschaft für Internationale Zusammenarbeit (GIZ), created by merging three aid organizations (German Technical Cooperation (GTZ), German Development Service (DED), and InWEnt). Also he created Engagement Global gGmbH, a state owned company, which is now responsible for founding of development aid initiatives of civil society in Germany.

In early 2012, Niebel met with Myanmar's opposition leader Aung San Suu Kyi and was soon among those pushing for a complete removal of sanctions against the country rather than a more gradual easing. This was meant to reward Myanmar for its rapid shift towards democracy while allowing European companies to gain a foothold ahead of their U.S. counterparts.

On 6 November 2011, Niebel inaugurated the newly established German Institute for Development Evaluation (DEval), the first body to independently evaluate the performance of German development cooperation interventions.

Under Niebel's leadership, Germany joined the United States and several other European states in late 2012 in partially suspending official development assistance to Rwanda after U.N. experts said senior Rwandan military officials had equipped, trained and directly commanded M23 rebels who briefly seized the city of Goma in eastern Democratic Republic of Congo. Only after negotiations with Rwandan Foreign Minister Louise Mushikiwabo in early 2013, Niebel agreed to use the unfrozen aid for economic development and vocational training rather than direct budget support.

Also in 2012, Niebel temporarily discontinued German payments into the Global Fund to Fight AIDS, Tuberculosis and Malaria (GFATM) after a corruption scandal came to light; at the time, Germany was the third largest donor to the Fund. Only in 2013, Niebel announced that Germany would contribute 1 billion euros (US$1.35 billion) to the GFATM for the period of 2012 to 2016.

In December 2012, Niebel had various development projects frozen in Egypt amid concerns about the "domestic and political developments" in the country, and fears that a "new dictatorship" was developing under Mohamed Morsi.

== Life after politics ==
Since 2015, Niebel has been an Advisor to the Executive Board of Rheinmetall. More than half of Rheinmetall's sales in 2019 were in the Defence segment.

== Political positions ==
=== Social policies ===
Niebel advocates a radical reform of the Federal Employment Agency (Bundesagentur für Arbeit). According to him, it should only manage and pay out the Unemployment insurance.

=== Relations with Israel ===
In June 2010, the Israeli government of Prime Minister Benjamin Netanyahu prevented Niebel from visiting Gaza. Niebel had wanted to see a €12 million, or $16.8 million, wastewater treatment facility financed by Germany. The Israeli government claimed at the time that Hamas, the Islamic militant group that rules Gaza, would exploit the visit.

In January 2011, Niebel met with Israeli Deputy Foreign Minister Danny Ayalon and signed a joint Declaration of Intent aimed to increase bilateral cooperation in effort to assist developing nations, agreeing to work towards the rehabilitation of the contaminated Lake Victoria in Kenya, the main source of water for several states and one of the sources of the Nile River. In February of the same year Ayalon and Niebel met again to examine aid to the new Republic of South Sudan.

=== Human rights ===
In response to the 2014 Uganda Anti-Homosexuality Act Niebel told Deutsche Presse-Agentur that Germany's financial aid to Uganda will be cut, with a stepwise plan for this having already been made.

== Controversies ==
=== Libya intervention ===
In March 2011, Niebel caused diplomatic tensions when he accused the United Nations-backed military alliance operating in Libya of hypocrisy. He argued that "it is notable that exactly those countries which are blithely dropping bombs in Libya are still drawing oil from Libya." He also criticized the French government of President Nicolas Sarkozy for a lack of consultation and Catherine Ashton, the EU's foreign policy chief, for “suboptimal” co-ordination.

=== Flying carpet affair ===
In June 2012, Niebel attracted controversy after he had a carpet flown home from Afghanistan for free. The Afghan rug weighed 30 kilos and was flown on an intelligence service plane, avoiding import tax. The ministry said the transportation from Kabul to Berlin on the jet of the chief of the secret service was done as "a personal favour". The centre-left opposition accused the minister of "brazen abuse" of office, which risked undermining Germany's efforts to promote good governance in countries like Afghanistan.

=== Hiring affair ===
On 2 May 2012 the German TV magazine Monitor reported that after Niebel took the office of Federal Minister of Economic Cooperation and Development over 40 members or staff of the FDP were hired to work in his ministry. Later that year, he appointed a Green Party member as head of the newly established German Institute for Development Evaluation (DEval).

== Other activities ==
=== Corporate boards ===
- KfW, ex-officio Member of the Board of Supervisory Directors (2009-2013)

=== Non-profit organizations ===
- German Rugby Federation, Patron (since 2009)
- ZDF, Member of the Television Board
- Friedrich Naumann Foundation, Member of the Board of Trustees (2003-2009)
- Max Planck Institute for Nuclear Physics, Member of the Board of Trustees (1999-2004)

== Recognition ==
- 2013 – Polio Eradication Champion Award of Rotary International
