= Africa Source =

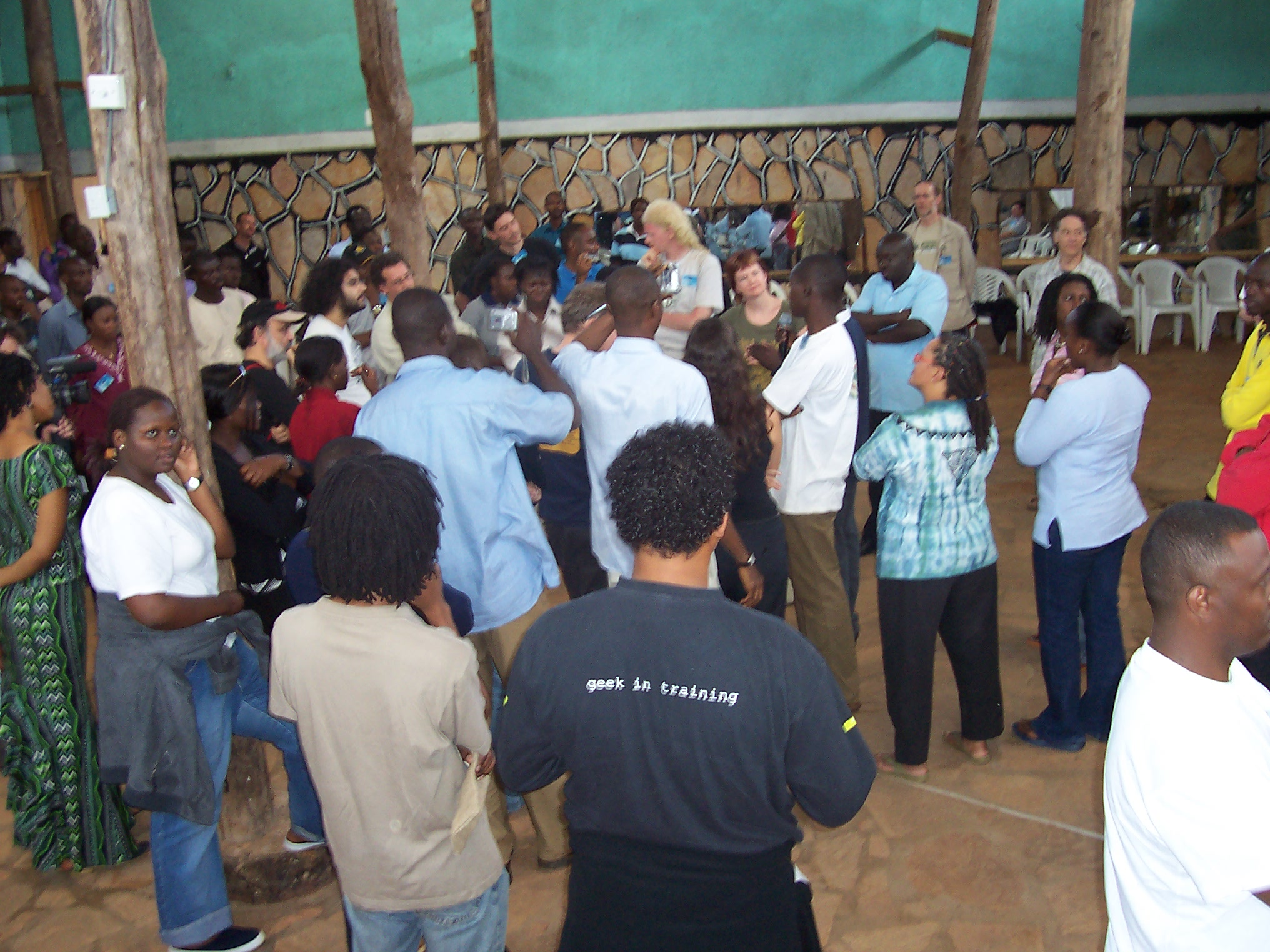
Participants at Africa Source 2

Africa Source was a set of events, held in 2004 and 2006 in Namibia and Uganda respectively, to promote the use of Free/Libre and Open Source Software (FLOSS) among non-profit and non-governmental organisations. Africa Source was part of the wider "Source Camps" organised by Tactical Technology Collective (Tacticaltech.org) and its partners, and was also linked to the Asia Source and other parallel events held elsewhere.

== Africa Source 1 ==
Africa Source's first camp was held from March 15 to 19, 2004 at Okahandja, Namibia. It had around 60 participants from across Africa. This event's focus was on "the practical challenges of realising F/OSS [Free/Libre and Open Source Software] in the African context, the aim was to build cooperation between Africa's most active F/OSS individuals and projects in the longer term."

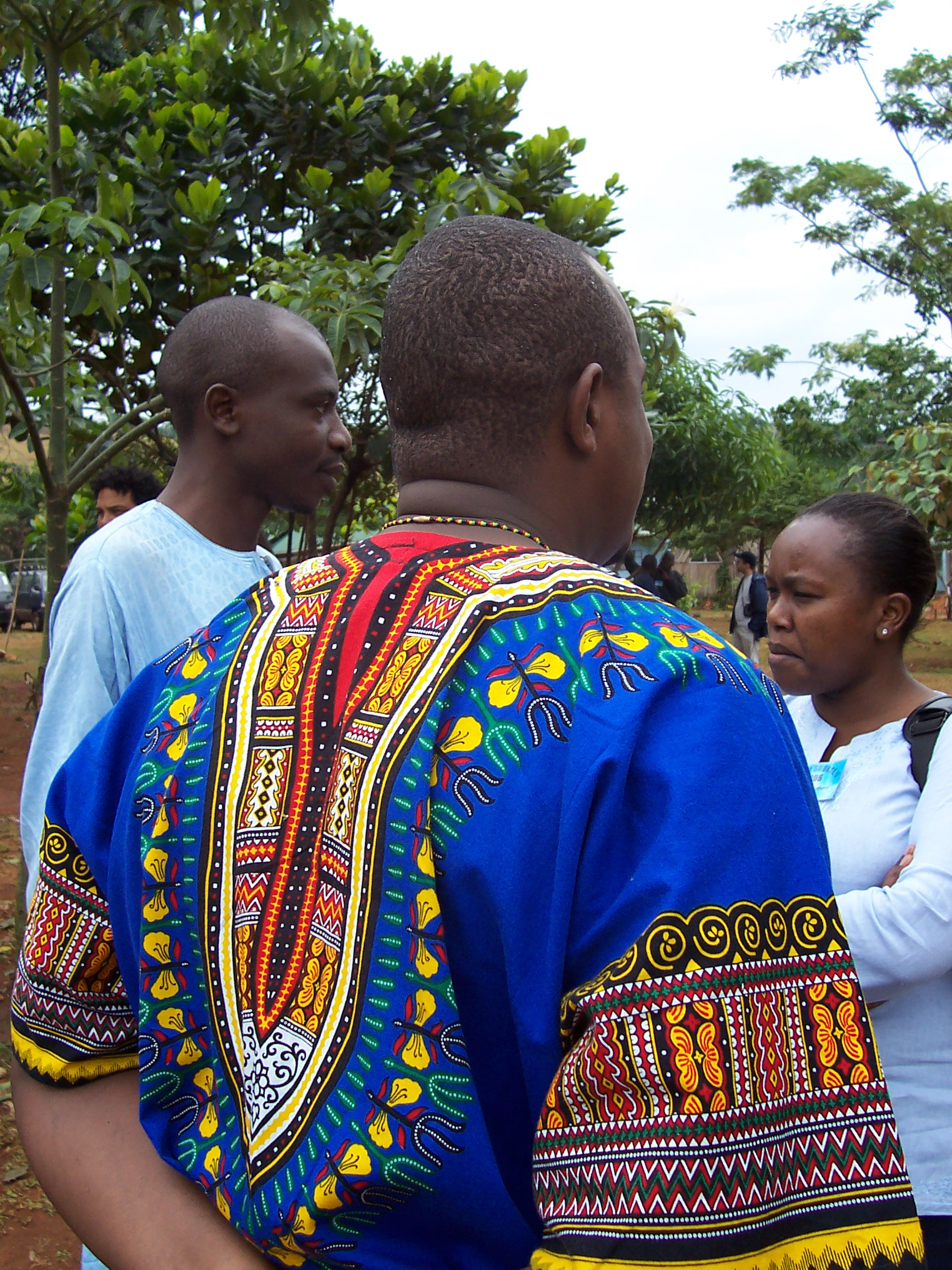
Sharing notes

Through "practical skill-share sessions", a range of issues were discussed, from localising of Linux distributions (or "distros") to setting up of wireless networks, work on content management systems, and designing or managing large databases.

It was organised by Tactical Tech, AllAfrica and SchoolNet Namibia. It was supported by the Open Society Initiative for Southern Africa (OSISA), Open Society Initiative for West Africa (OSIWA), OSI Budapest, USAID and O'Reilly.

== Africa Source 2 ==
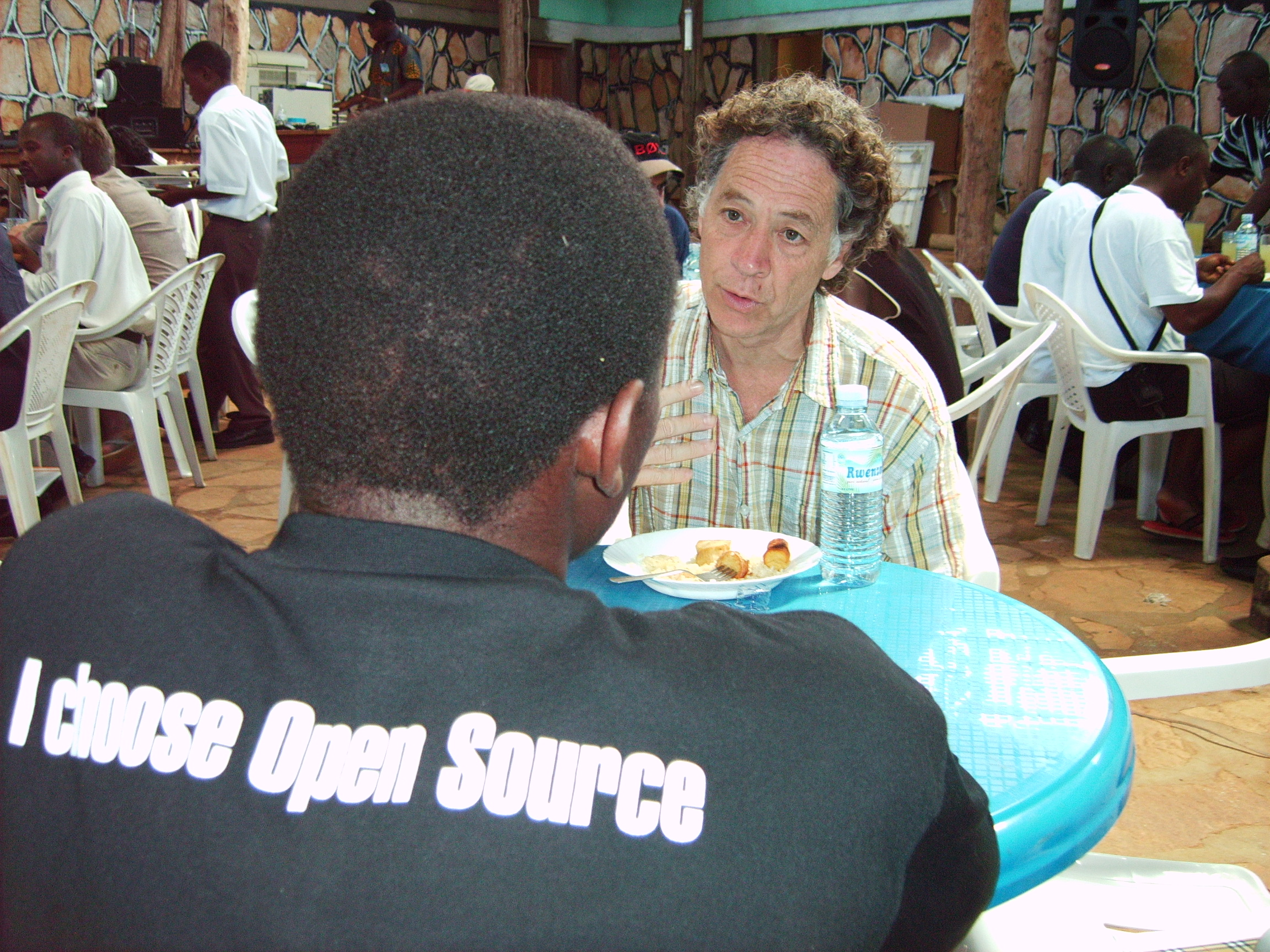
At the camp lunch table, on a rainy, indoors day.

Africa Source 2 was organised in the first fortnight of January 2006 in Kalangala, an island on Lake Victoria, in Uganda. Organisers announced that the Africa Source II agenda was to be developed for the following primary target audiences:

- NGO (non-government organisation) IT practitioners working with educational institutions, resource and community centres, rights based NGOs and health information organisations
- IT developers, advocates and implementors
- People interested in the localization of software

Main themes for the event were:

- migration and adoption
- alternative access, education and resource centres;
- information handling and advocacy;
- localisation

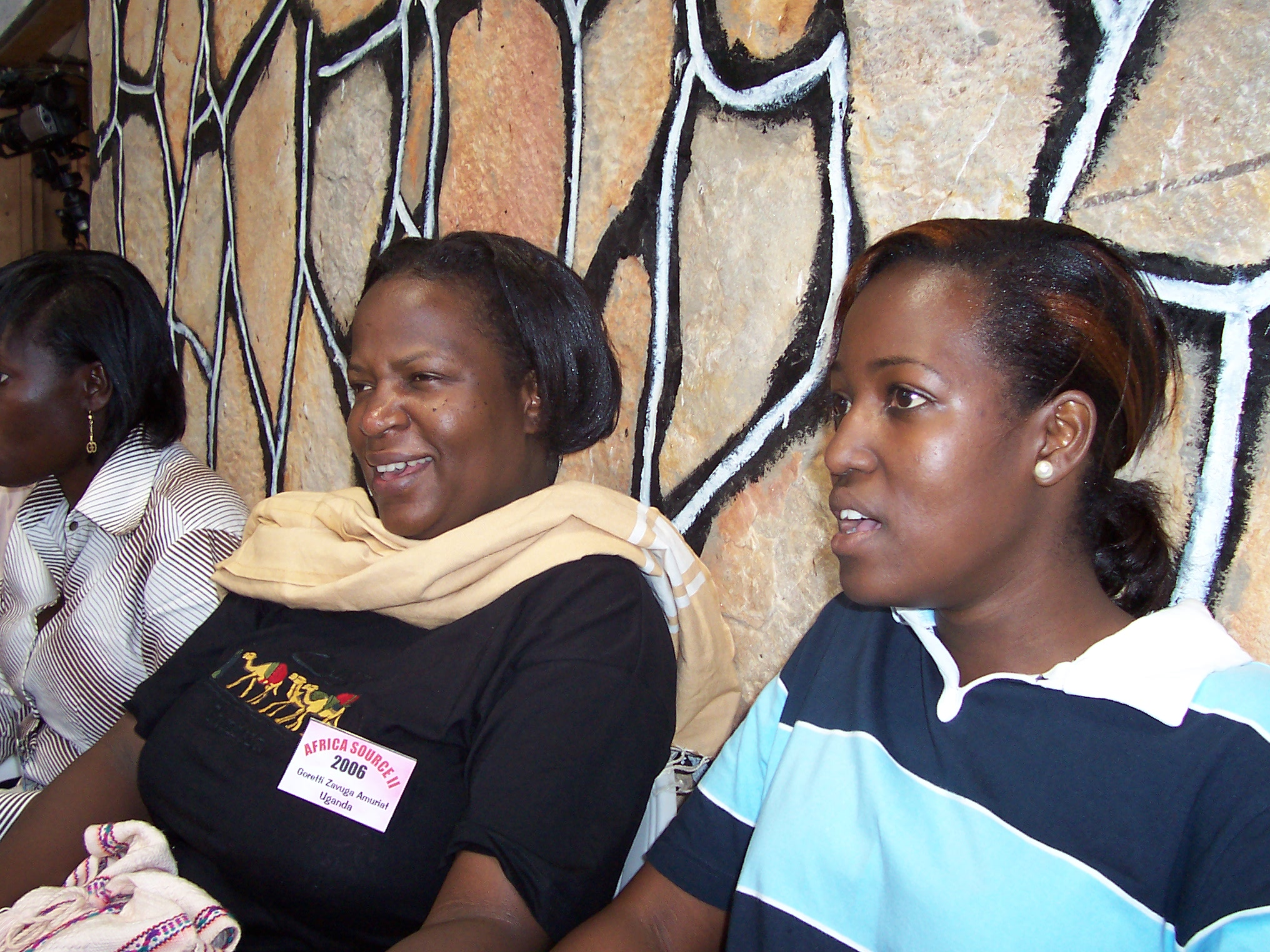
Faces from the event

Many issues came up for debate at the Africa Source 2. Among them were that FLOSS is still too complicated for non-profit organisations and schools to use, and the need for translating FLOSS into African languages.

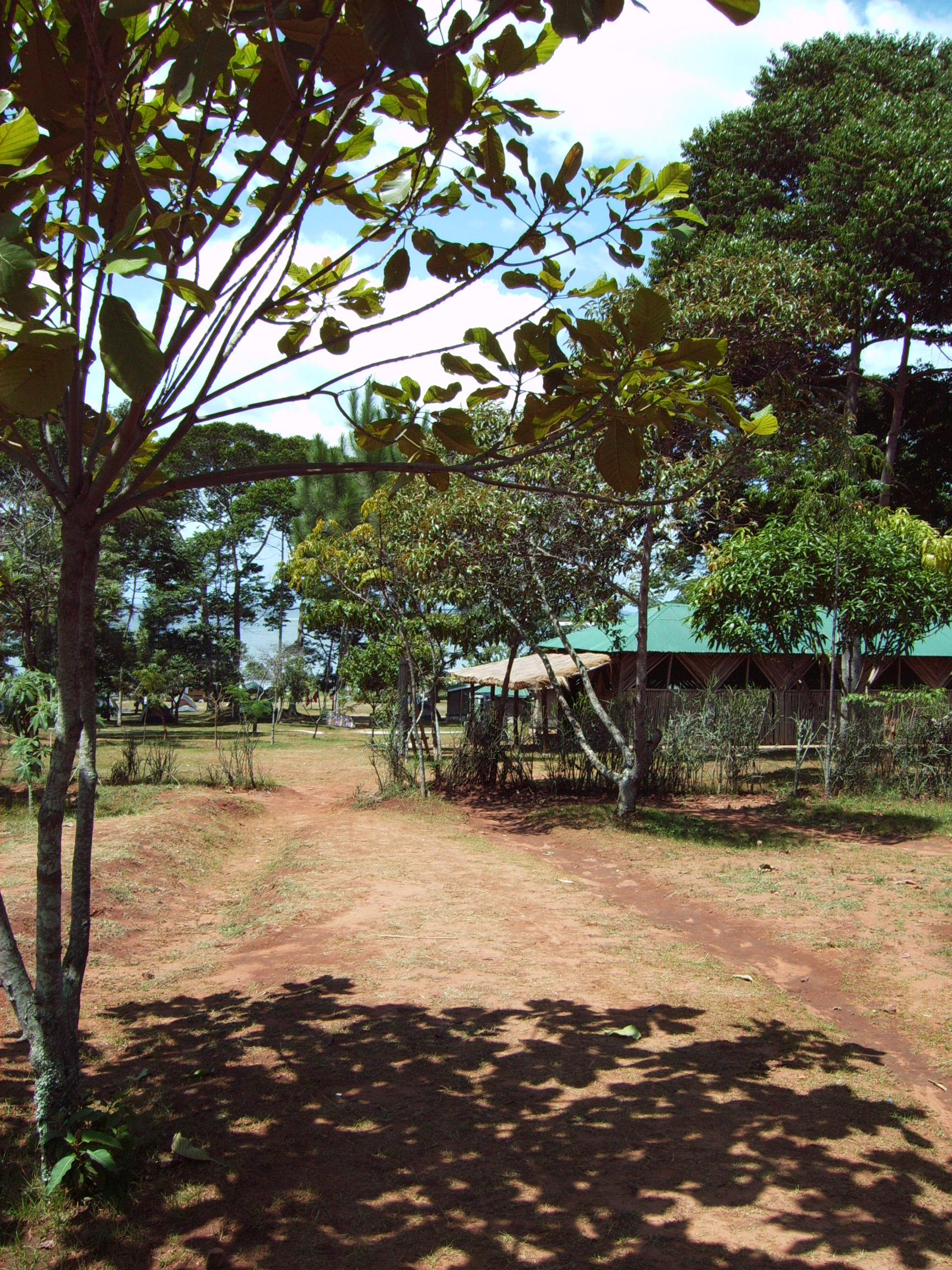
Campsite view.

The event had three tracks: 'migration for NGOs', 'migration for education', and 'information management'

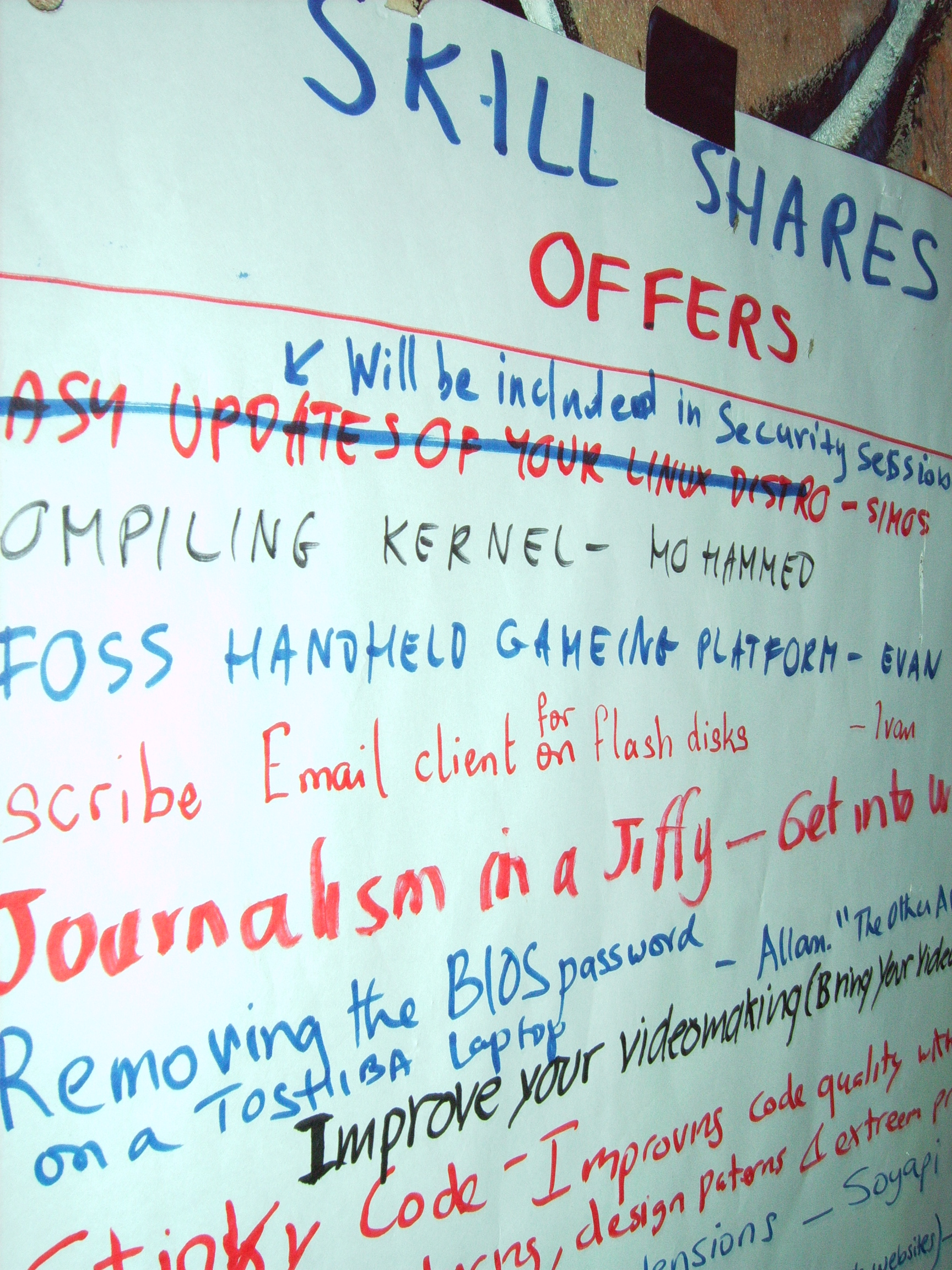
Skills: wanted, offered

In the information track, participants voiced a range of needs. Some asked for details about online tools for publishing. Others wanted the low-down on building and managing community portals. There also was a request for inputs on multimedia authoring and publishing (in both video and audio). Participants also wanted to know how to build a news website.
