= Sunil Abraham =

Indian technology policy analyst and free software advocate (born 1973)

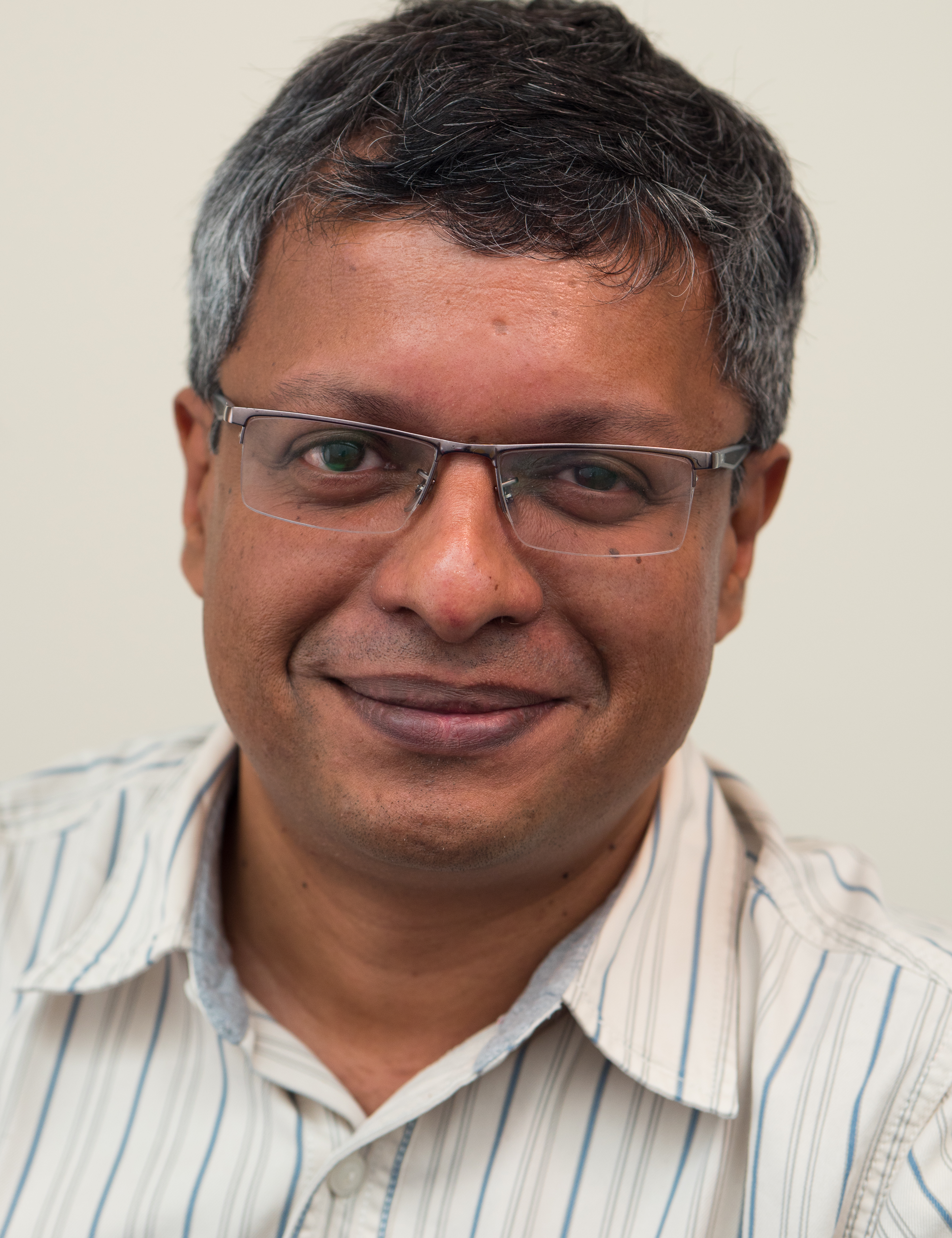
- Sunil Abraham
- Born: 17 June 1973 (age 53); Bangalore, Karnataka India
- Education: Dayananda Sagar College of Engineering
- Occupations: Director of Public Policy, Facebook India; Endowed Professor, ArtEZ University of Arts, Former Executive Director at the Centre for Internet and Society

Sunil Abraham is an Indian technology policy analyst and free software advocate, and the director of public policy at Facebook India. He was formerly an endowed professor at ArtEZ University of Arts and the co-founder and executive director of the Centre for Internet and Society. He is a board member of Open Society Foundations. and an honorary steward at Shuttleworth Foundation. He joined Facebook in October 2020 to lead their Public Policy division in India.

== Career ==
In 1998, Abraham founded Mahiti, a company providing low-cost software services to the voluntary sector, where he continues to serve as a board member. Abraham was elected as an Ashoka Fellow in 1999, and received the Sarai FLOSS Fellowship in 2003.

He managed the United Nations' International Open Source Network from 2004 to 2007. In 2008, he co-founded the Centre for Internet and Society, a non-profit research organisation based in India.

== Views ==
Abraham has spoken in favour of greater online free speech, digital privacy, and net neutrality., He has criticized some of the aspects of Aadhaar, the biometric-based unique identity system of India. He was an early proponent for a data protection law for India.

== Bibliography ==
- Digital Natives with a Cause?: A Knowledge Survey and Framework (2009)
- Open government data study: India (2012)
- Government access to private-sector data in India (2012)
- Open standards (2008)
