= Local Government ICT Network =

South African knowledge sharing portal

Logo of the LG ICT Network

The Local Government ICT Network, also known as LG ICT Network, is the knowledge sharing portal for information and communication technologies (ICT) in local government in South Africa. The Network is hosted by the South African Local Government Association (SALGA) and supported by the Deutsche Gesellschaft für Internationale Zusammenarbeit (German Agency for International Cooperation). It has been publicly available since May 2011 as a dedicated online community for ICT practitioners in public service delivery and has members from almost all 278 municipalities of South Africa.

Its objectives include the sharing of interesting documents, the identification and promotion of best practices, the provision of regular updates about important events, jobs and news. The LG ICT Network is intended to serve as a space for free discussion and exchange.
In August 2011 a 2-day live Event ConnectIT was held in Birchwood Convention Centre, Johannesburg with over 400 participants and participation from the private and public sector. In 2012 the Network presented its work among other occasion at the Public Participation Conference of the Gauteng Legislature and at the Tech Demo Africa 2012.
