= Tactical Technology Collective =

Tactical Tech
- Formation: 2003
- Headquarters: Berlin, Germany
- Website: Official website

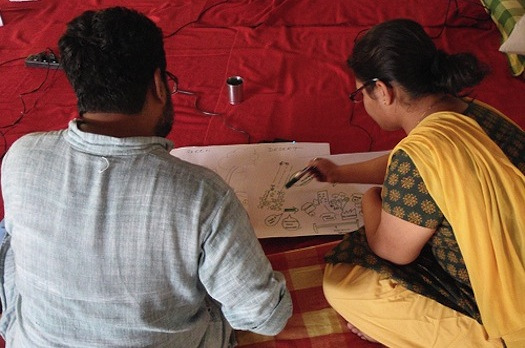
A Tactical Tech mapping workshop held in India in 2009

Tactical Technology Collective (or Tactical Tech) is an international nongovernmental organization that engages with citizens and civil society organisations to explore and mitigate the impacts of technology on society. As of 2014, the organisation is based in Berlin with two staff including co-founder and executive director Stephanie Hankey.

== Key projects ==
- Events including Summer Source Camp, an open source workshop, held in Croatia (2003), Africa Source, open source workshop, held in Namibia (2004) and Uganda (2006) and Asia Source, a series of three open source camps held in Bangalore, India (2005), in Sukabumi, Indonesia (2007) and in Silang in the Philippines (2009).
- '10 Tactics for Turning Information into Action', a 50-minute film (2009) that shows "how social justice organizations in the Global South use everything from Google Earth to Facebook in their campaigns."
- NGO-in-a-Box (2005) provided free and open source software to nonprofit organizations.
- Security in-a-box (2008–2019) was created with Front Line Defenders to help people stay safe and secure online.
- Me and My Shadow (2011–2018) helped people identifying ways their devices and accounts are emitting information.
- Data Detox Kit (2016–present)
- The organization also creates digital security training curriculum modules.
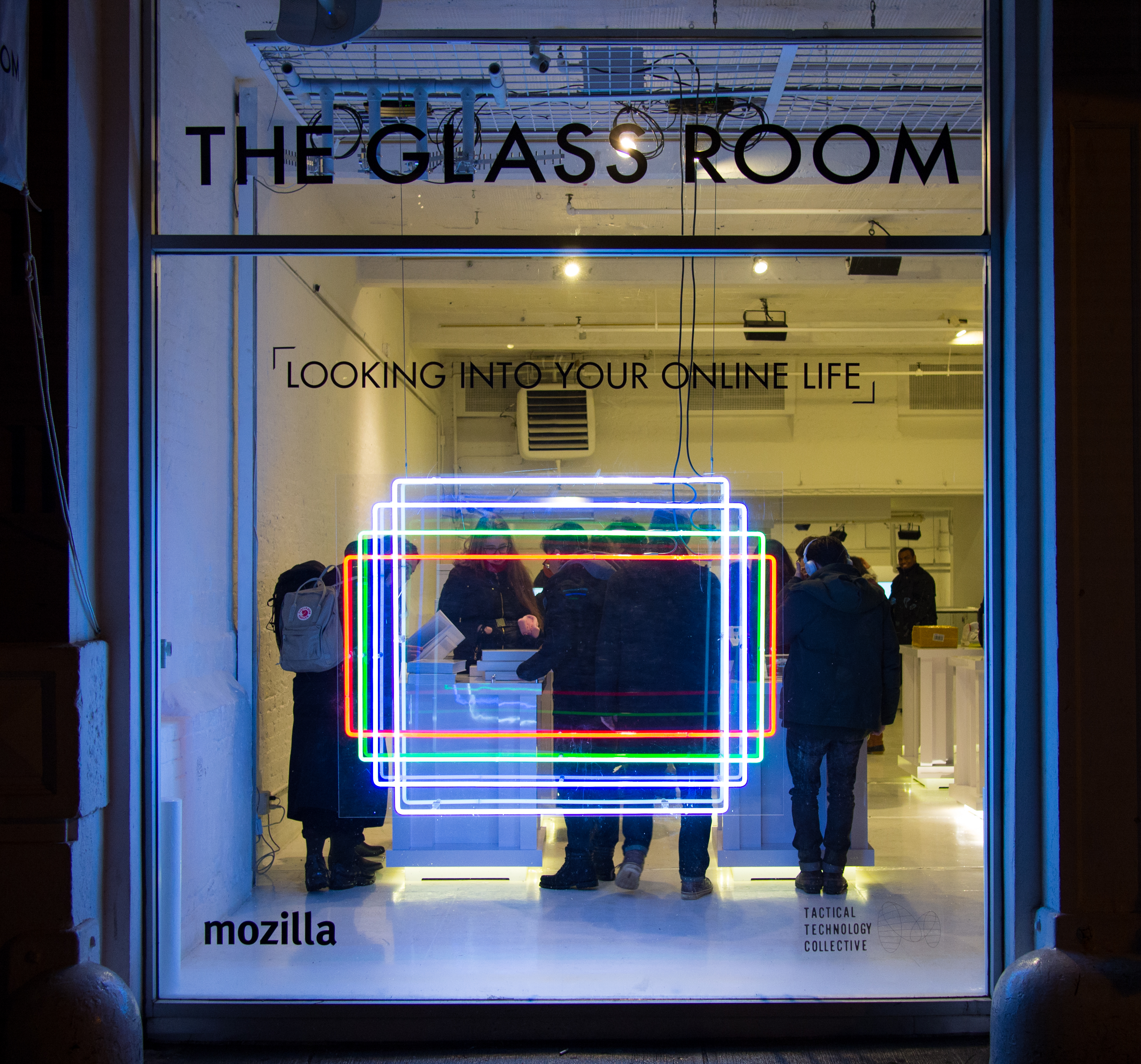
  The Glass Room, a pop-up exhibition curated by Tactical Tech and presented by Mozilla in Manhattan in 2016

=== The Glass Room ===
The Glass Room was launched in 2016 with the Mozilla Foundation as an art installation that helped demonstrate the importance of privacy and security.

Installations of the exhibit have included:

- The White Room Berlin (2016)
- The Glass Room New York (2016)
- The Glass Room London (2017)
- The Glass Room San Francisco (2019)

== See also ==
- Electronic Frontier Foundation
- Open Knowledge Foundation
