= FISME =

The Federation of Indian Micro and Small & Medium Enterprises (FISME)
- Founded: 1995
- Headquarters: New Delhi, India
- Number of locations: 5
- Key people: Animesh Saxena, President
- Website: www.fisme.org.in

The Federation of Indian Micro and Small & Medium Enterprises (FISME) is an Indian NGO that is the progressive face of Indian MSMEs and is regarded as such by the Government of India. It is a member of the National MSME Board formed under the MSME Act 2006. FISME is consulted by SME policy making set-up of the country and also works in close coordination with the Ministry of Micro, Small & Medium Enterprises as well as major multilateral and bilateral bodies in India such as UNIDO, ILO, UNCTAD, DFID, GTZ etc. Supported by UNCTAD, DFID and Ministry of Commerce & Industry, as a Tier-I partner, FISME is leading 22 provincial SME bodies in 18 states.

== History ==
Coinciding with the launch of major policy and support initiatives of the Indian government to promote the growth and development of small scale industries in India, FISME was initially born as the National Alliance of Young Entrepreneurs (NAYE) in 1967 to provide an outreach and advocacy forum for small industries in particular and entrepreneurship in general. In the post-liberalisation era, NAYE along with eight state level associations formed FISME in 1995.

== Events ==
FISME conducts regular events across India catering to the different needs of SMEs. They recently conducted India SME forum recently in participation with other organisations.
