= Gabriel Accascina =

ICT specialist

- Education: Harvard University (fellow)
- Occupations: ICT specialist; development consultant
- Employer: United Nations Development Programme (former)

Gabriel Accascina is an information and communication technology specialist and development consultant. His work has focused on the application of digital technologies in international development, particularly in the Asia–Pacific region. He is a former official of the United Nations Development Programme (UNDP), where he worked on information and communication technology (ICT) initiatives.

== Early life and education ==
Accascina holds a master's degree in development communication and is a Fellow with the Center for International Development at Harvard University.

== Career ==
Accascina began his career in the information technology sector in Silicon Valley in the early 1980s. Between 1982 and 1991, he operated a consultancy providing IT and media services.

In the early 1990s, he transitioned to work in information and communication technologies for development (ICT4D), undertaking assignments in Africa and later in the Asia–Pacific region.

He later joined the United Nations Development Programme (UNDP), where he served as Regional Coordinator of the Asia-Pacific Development Information Programme (APDIP), based in Kuala Lumpur, Malaysia. The programme supported the use of information and communication technologies (ICT) in development through policy support, training, and knowledge-sharing activities across the Asia–Pacific region.

During this period, APDIP worked with governments, United Nations agencies, educational institutions, and civil society organisations across the region. Between 1997 and 2001, the programme supported internet connectivity initiatives in Bhutan and East Timor, and provided training and technical support related to digital infrastructure and policy development. During his tenure, APDIP participated in partnerships with private sector organisations, including Cisco Systems, within broader United Nations efforts to cooperate with technology companies in ICT for development initiatives.

Accascina was associated with the NetAid initiative, a joint project of the United Nations Development Programme (UNDP) and Cisco Systems launched in 1999, which combined an online platform with a series of benefit concerts held in New York, London, and Geneva. The initiative incorporated early forms of internet-based broadcasting across multiple locations and has been referenced in United Nations documentation in the context of digital platforms for development communication.

He contributed to the development of the Mobile Internet Unit initiative in Malaysia, implemented under UNDP in cooperation with the Government of Malaysia. The project used a mobile facility equipped with computers and internet access to deliver ICT training in rural communities.

Following the 1999 independence referendum in East Timor, he worked on ICT-related reconstruction efforts, including the establishment of satellite-based internet connectivity for United Nations operations in Dili and support for early public information systems.

He also contributed to ICT-related development activities in other contexts, including preparatory work for e-government and capacity-building initiatives in Yemen in 2003.

After his work with UNDP, Accascina became director of IT4Dev, a consultancy focused on ICT applications in development. His work has included advisory assignments for governments, multilateral organisations, and development agencies on ICT policy and infrastructure. He has also contributed to work related to aid information management systems and development cooperation frameworks, including collaboration with the OECD Development Co-operation Directorate.

== Publications and contributions ==
Accascina has been cited in United Nations publications related to ICT and development, including the Human Development Report (2001). He was interviewed in the Journal of Global Information Technology Management (1999) on ICT4D programmes and development communication.

His work has been referenced in academic and policy literature on ICT capacity building, digital education, and development information systems. A contribution attributed to him appears in Losing Control? Sovereignty in an Age of Globalization (1995), which examines issues related to sovereignty and cyberspace^{.}

He has been listed as a reviewer in a UNESCO publication on ICT competency standards for teachers (2008). He is also listed as a co-author of a 2006 working paper prepared with the Organisation for Economic Co-operation and Development (OECD) and UNDP on aid information management systems and the Paris Declaration on Aid Effectiveness.

Accascina has been acknowledged as a contributor/consulted expert in United Nations background papers on information technology for development. In 1993, he contributed photographs to The State of Pacific Children, a UNICEF publication on social conditions in the Pacific region.

== Professional activities ==
Accascina has participated in international forums on ICT and development policy, including discussions on digital divide issues, internet governance, and e-governance.

In 1998, he participated in the Asia-Pacific meeting of the International Forum on the White Paper (IFWP) in Singapore, addressing internet governance and domain name system reform. He has also taken part in processes related to the World Summit on the Information Society (WSIS) and discussions linked to the Paris Declaration on Aid Effectiveness.

He was a member of the Fellowship Committee for APRICOT 2000. In 2000, he participated in discussions in Cambridge, Massachusetts on ICT infrastructure in developing regions.

In 2003, he took part in UNDP-related discussions in Yemen on e-government and public administration reform. He was listed as a speaker at the European Development Days in Warsaw in 2011 in connection with UNDP knowledge management activities.

In 2012, he participated in a United States Institute of Peace workshop on data use for food security analysis.
