= Swedish Program for ICT in Developing Regions =

The Swedish Program for ICT in Development Regions (SPIDER) is an ICT4D non governmental organization based in Sweden.

The organization has acted as an ICT4D central node in a network of actors from academia, civil society, government and business in Sweden and abroad for more than 10 years. The organization has supported projects and organizations including:

- ICT4Democracy in East Africa Network
- ICT4D Cambodia Network
- The International Network for Postgraduate Students in the area of ICT4D (IPID)

SPIDER is hosted by the Department for Computer and Systems Sciences (DSV) at Stockholm University and funded by the Swedish International Development Agency (Sida) with complementary funding from Stockholm University.
