= PlayPower =

Non-profit organization

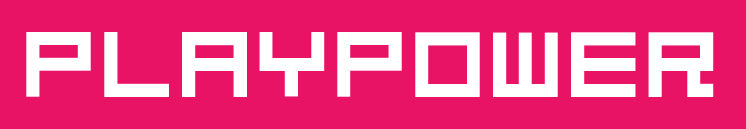
- Founded: 2008
- Founder: Derek Lomas, Daniel Rehn, Jeremy Douglass
- Type: Non-profit organization video game industry
- Purpose: educational games
- Location: San Diego, CA
- Website: www.playpower.org

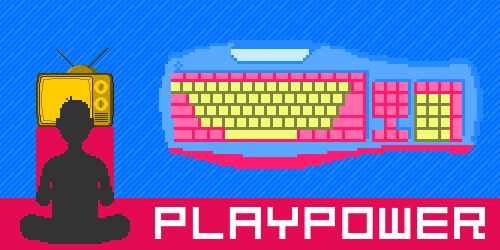
Playpower 8-bit logo

PlayPower is a non-profit organization designed to create free educational computer software for low income families in India and other developing countries. After 2012 the project was reformed as PlayPower Labs, LLC, which focuses now on educational games for mobile platforms.

== Concept ==
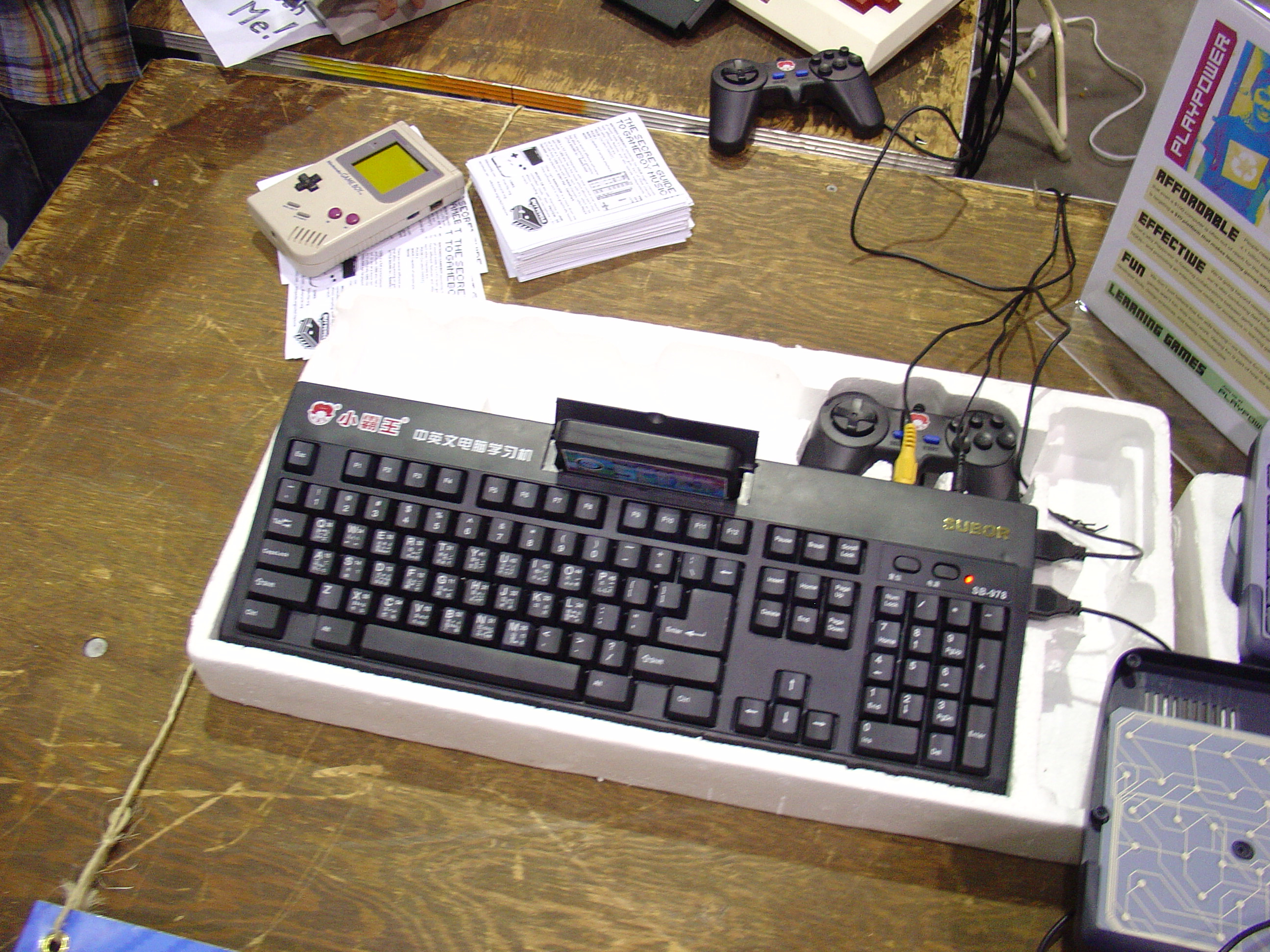
Subor cheap 8-bit game console, Bay Area 2008

The games are designed to run on 8-bit systems, using designs and processors that are in the public domain e.g. Famicom clones which patents have expired, which allows the games to be run on very low cost computers. For $12, families can buy a compatible computer with an 8-bit, 6502 processor, a keyboard, a slot for game cartridges, a mouse, and two game controllers. Lacking its own monitor, the computer plugs into a TV screen for display. Part of the software should be acquired as source code of commercially unavailable educational games, like Number Munchers and Lemonade Stand, and ported by the open-source community.

At least three games were in production as of early 2010, "Hanuman Typing warrior", "Hanuman's Quiz Adventure" and the "Mosquito game". The project opened the source code for these three games, written in assembly. One of them teaches players how to type, which can greatly improve their earning potential in the job market. Another is a multiple choice question game, somewhat similar to that featured in the film Slumdog Millionaire. And finally, a different game was created to raise awareness of malaria (which infects 1.5 million people a year in India) by allowing players to kill mosquitoes and accumulate points toward antimalarial mosquito nets.

== History ==
The organization was founded in 2008 by Derek Lomas and Daniel Rehn, who were students at the University of California at San Diego at the time, and Jeremy Douglass, a postdoctoral research fellow at the same school at the time.

In 2012 Daniel Rehn announced on his private homepage the PowerPlay project as "finished".

After 2012 the Playpower project was transformed to "Playpower Labs, LLC" and offers now mobile platform educational games via Apple's iTunes store and Google's play store.

== Reception ==
PlayPower won the MacArthur Foundation's Digital Media and Learning Competition in 2009, for which it received $180,000 to help fund its activities. More than 100 volunteer programmers from around the world have signed up to help develop games.

The project was noted in the academic domain and by the web community like BoingBoing.

== See also ==
- Uzebox
