= Deutscher Entwicklungsdienst =

Former German development organization

The Deutscher Entwicklungsdienst (DED) (German Development Service) was a German development organization active between 1963 and 2010. It was one of the leading European development services for personnel cooperation. It was focused on sending professional Germans to work in developing countries on small development projects. It was a non-profit company with a 95% controlling stake by the German government and 5% by the NGO "Learning and Helping Overseas". It is now part of the Deutsche Gesellschaft für Internationale Zusammenarbeit (German Society for International Cooperation) (GIZ).

== History ==
The DED was founded in 1963, in the presence of Konrad Adenauer and John F. Kennedy. The first headquarters was at Wächtersbach in Hessen. In 1971 they moved to Berlin-Kladow. In 1999 the DED moved its headquarters from Berlin to Bonn (Tulpenfeld quarter) due to the Berlin/Bonn law. On 1 January 2011, the DED was together with Inwent absorbed by the Deutsche Gesellschaft für Technische Zusammenarbeit (German Society for Technical Cooperation/GTZ), which was then renamed to Deutsche Gesellschaft für Internationale Zusammenarbeit (German Society for International Cooperation/GIZ).

From 1963 to 2007, more than 15,000 development workers have committed themselves to improve the living conditions of people in Africa, Asia and Latin America. The first 14 supporters for the so-called Third World went 20 August 1964 by plane to Daressalam (Tanzania).

== Working areas ==
The last Director General was Jürgen Wilhelm. They worked primarily in the following areas: Promotion of Economic and employment promotion, Promotion of democracy, Rural development and conservation of resources, Water, Civil conflict management and promotion of peace, and Health.
