= Asia-Pacific Development Information Programme =

Asia-Pacific Development Information Programme was an initiative of UNDP (United Nations Development Programme) and "aims to promote the development and application of information and communication technologies (or, ICTs) for sustainable human development". Its sphere of work was the Asia-Pacific region. APDIP was based within the UN premises in Kuala Lumpur, Malaysia.

APDIP said it "aims to meet its goals by focusing on three inter-related core areas". The first is policy development and dialogue, the second is access, and the third is content development and knowledge management.

== Aims, approach ==
From its publications, APDIP said it "collaborates with national governments, regional, international and multi-lateral development organizations, UN agencies, educational and research organizations, civil society groups, and the private sector". This was done by integrating Information and Communication Technologies" (ICTs) in the development process.

== Strategies ==
To achieve its objectives it also employed what it termed a dynamic mic of strategies—awareness raising, capacity building, technical assistance and advice, research and development, knowledge sharing and partnership building.

== Countries covered ==
The countries covered by APDIP were those supported by UNDP's Regional Bureau for Asia and the Pacific (RBAS): Afghanistan, Bangladesh, Bhutan, Brunei Darussalam, Cambodia, China, Cook Islands, Democratic People's Republic of Korea, East Timor, Fiji, Federated States of Micronesia, French Polynesia, India, Indonesia, Iran, Kiribati, Laos, Malaysia, Maldives, Mongolia, Myanmar, Nauru, Nepal, New Caledonia, Niue, Pakistan, Palau, Papua New Guinea, Philippines, Republic of Marshall Islands, Republic of Korea, Singapore, Solomon Islands, Sri Lanka, Thailand, Tokelau, Tonga, Trust Territories of the Pacific Islands, Tuvalu, Vanuatu and Vietnam.

== Initial Team ==
APDIP's initial team (1997 - 2001) launched the Programme and included Gabriel Accascina (Regional Coordinator), Patrick Gremillet (Deputy Coordinator), Ramita Sharma (Project Officer), Ian Azlan Shah (Project Officer), Cynthia Hor (Project Officer), Kit Roche (Admin support), Marc Lepage (JPO) and Deuter Zinnbauer (intern).

== Achievements (1997-2001) ==
Under the initial team, APDIP's projects included:

- Countries' connection to the Internet, including Bhutan and East Timor;
- Support to Internet engineering training, via the APDIP-CISCO Network Academy Program;
- National projects such as the Mobile Internet Unit in Malaysia, a mobile ICT training classroom.

== Second Team ==
APDIP's second team (2001 - 2008) comprised [Programme co-ordinator Shahid AKHTAR, FOSS consultant Sunil Abraham, programme specialist for content development and knowledge management Christine APIKUL, programme specialist for policy development and dialogue Lars BESTLE, practice team assistant Wasinee TRAYAPORN, programme specialist for access and partnership development James George CHACKO, programme specialist for building capacities and partnerships Phet SAYO, programme specialist for ICT4D based in Sri Lanka Chanuka WATTEGAMA, programme specialist for access and partnerships Isa Seow and IT consultant Khairil YUSOF.

== Achievements (2001- onwards) THE IOSN ==
Among the techie community, one of the better-known initiatives of the APDIP is the International Open Source Network (or, IOSN), which is supported by the International Development Research Centre (IDRC) of Canada.

IOSN has been termed a "centre of excellence for Free/Open Source Software (FOSS), Open Content and Open Standards" in the Asia-Pacific region.

In 2006, IOSN undertook plans for expansion of its activities with three more "centres of excellence".

The CodeBreakers is a video production by APDIP in which a Team of independent producers visited nearly 12 Countries worldwide to see how the adoption of FOSS presents opportunities for industry and capacity development, software piracy reduction, and localization and customization for diverse cultural and development needs.
