= Centre for Internet and Society (India) =

Internet research organization in India, based in Bangalore

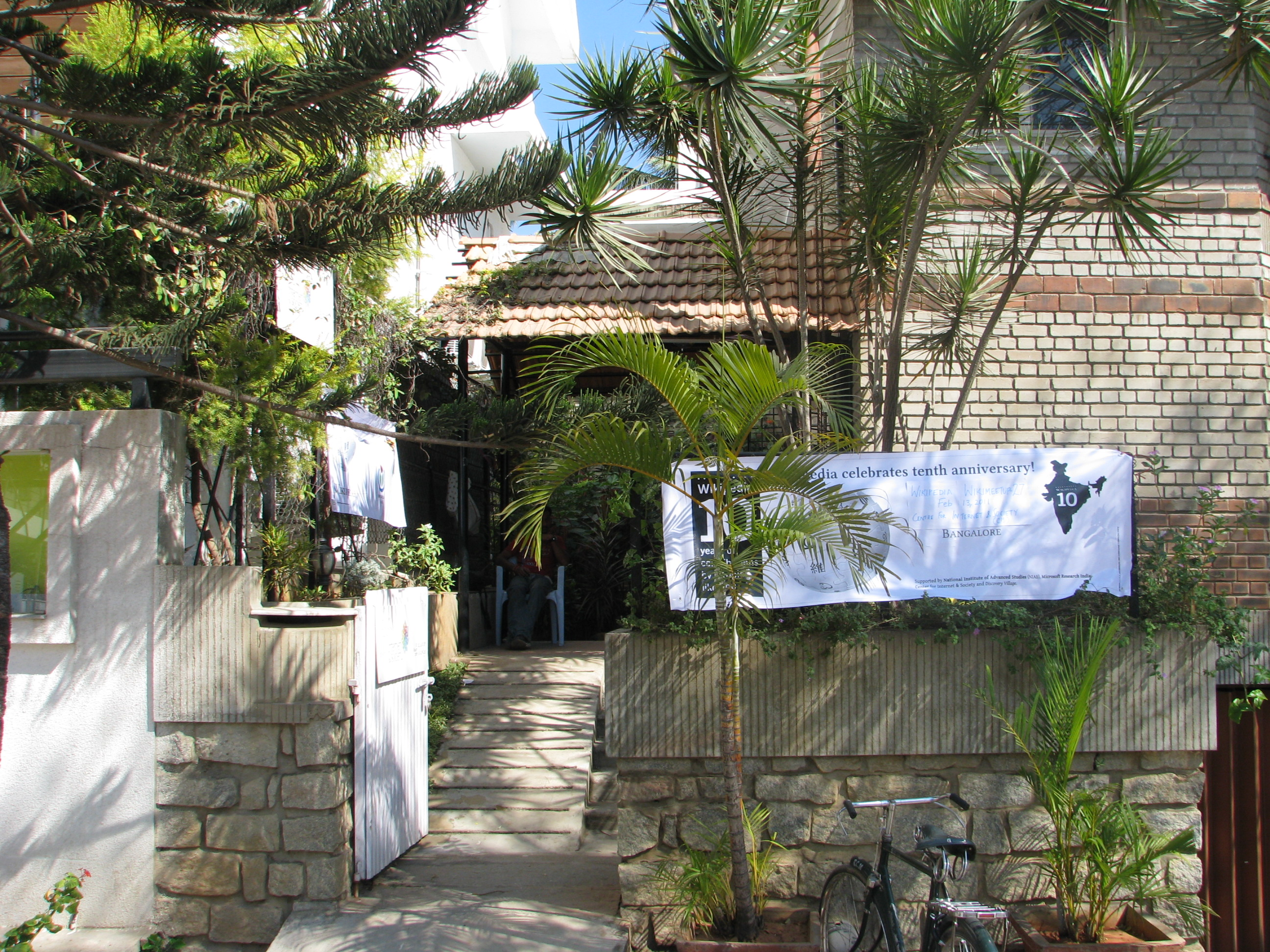
- CIS headquarters in Domlur, Bangalore.
- Abbreviation: CIS
- Type: Non-profit organization
- Headquarters: No 32, 1st Floor, 2nd Block, Austin Town, Viveka Nagar, Bangalore, Karnataka, India
- Website: cis-india.org

The Centre for Internet and Society (CIS) is an Indian non-profit multidisciplinary research organization, based in Bengaluru. CIS works on digital pluralism, public accountability and pedagogic practices, in the field of the Internet and Society.

CIS was founded in 2008 by Sunil Abraham, based on an idea by Lawrence Liang, with initial funding by Anurag Dikshit who by 2014 remained among the centre's financial backers, alongside Rohini Nilekani. In 2020, Amber Sinha succeeded Abraham as executive director. During its first half decade, major work areas of CIS included contributing to the Indian government's efforts to standardize e-governance, as well as the country's privacy laws and telecom policy, and efforts to improve internet access in rural areas.

== Wikimedia projects ==
The Wikimedia Foundation granted a project to CIS to promote and support the Indic language Wikimedia’s Indic language free knowledge projects, including Wikipedia in Indic languages and English. The grant is also aimed to support wider distribution of Wikimedia’s free knowledge within India. The award amount for the first year of the two-year project was Rs. 11 million (US $200,000).

== Swatantra 2014 ==
CIS supported and participated in Swatantra 2014, the fifth international free software conference event, organized at Thiruvananthapuram, Kerala from 18 to 20 December 2014.
