= Alumniportal Deutschland =

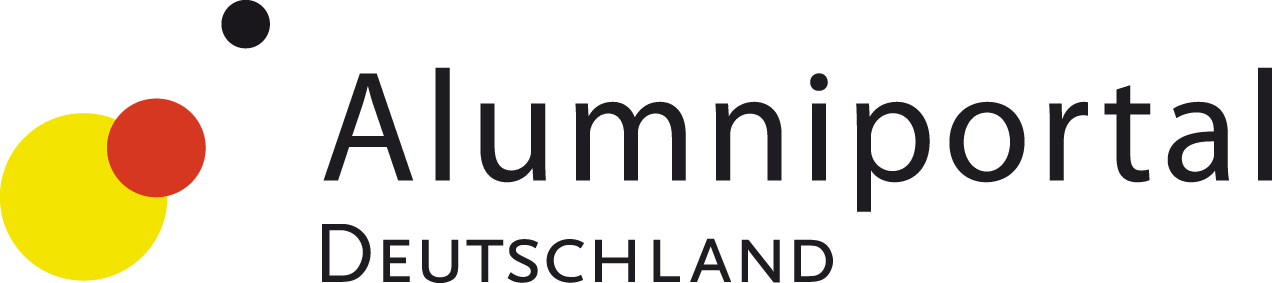
- Founded: September 2008
- Location: Germany
- Website: www.alumniportal-deutschland.org

Alumniportal Deutschland is a non-profit online social network of "Germany Alumni" that is designed internationally for people who have studied, researched, worked or completed further training or a language course in Germany or at a German institution abroad.

== Overview ==
It offers all international Germany alumni, regardless of whether or not they received a scholarship from one of the many German scholarship organizations, an opportunity to get in touch with Germany alumni from around the world as well as some companies. The registration and use of Alumniportal Deutschland is free of charge and can be done as individual or as business/organization.

The project is administered by a core group of four major German organizations (Alexander von Humboldt Foundation, German Academic Exchange Service, Goethe-Institut, supported by strategic partners and financed by the Federal Ministry for Economic Cooperation and Development of Germany and supported by the Federal Foreign Office.

The Alumniportal Deutschland is available in both English and German. The communication language within the community is arbitrary.

== History ==
As of 2024, more than 27,000 users from 184 countries have registered with the Alumniportal.

== Structure of the website ==
The Alumniportal Deutschland is divided into various sections: the Online Community, Topics & Projects, Webinars & Events and a section on Jobs & Careers, Groups, Members & Network.

The Online Community is the social networking component of the website. Registered members have the opportunity to network and communicate with fellow alumni and participating organizations using the standard array of social networking tools such as groups, blogs, profiles, etc.

== Partner organizations ==
The primary non-profit and non-governmental organizations responsible for creating, maintaining and promoting Alumniportal Deutschland are:

- Alexander von Humboldt Foundation (AvH; in German: Alexander von Humboldt-Stiftung)
- German Academic Exchange Service (DAAD; in German: Deutscher Akademischer Austauschdienst)
- Goethe-Institut

In 2019, the Federal Foreign Office (Auswärtiges Amt) took over the funding of the portal.
