= International Open Source Network =

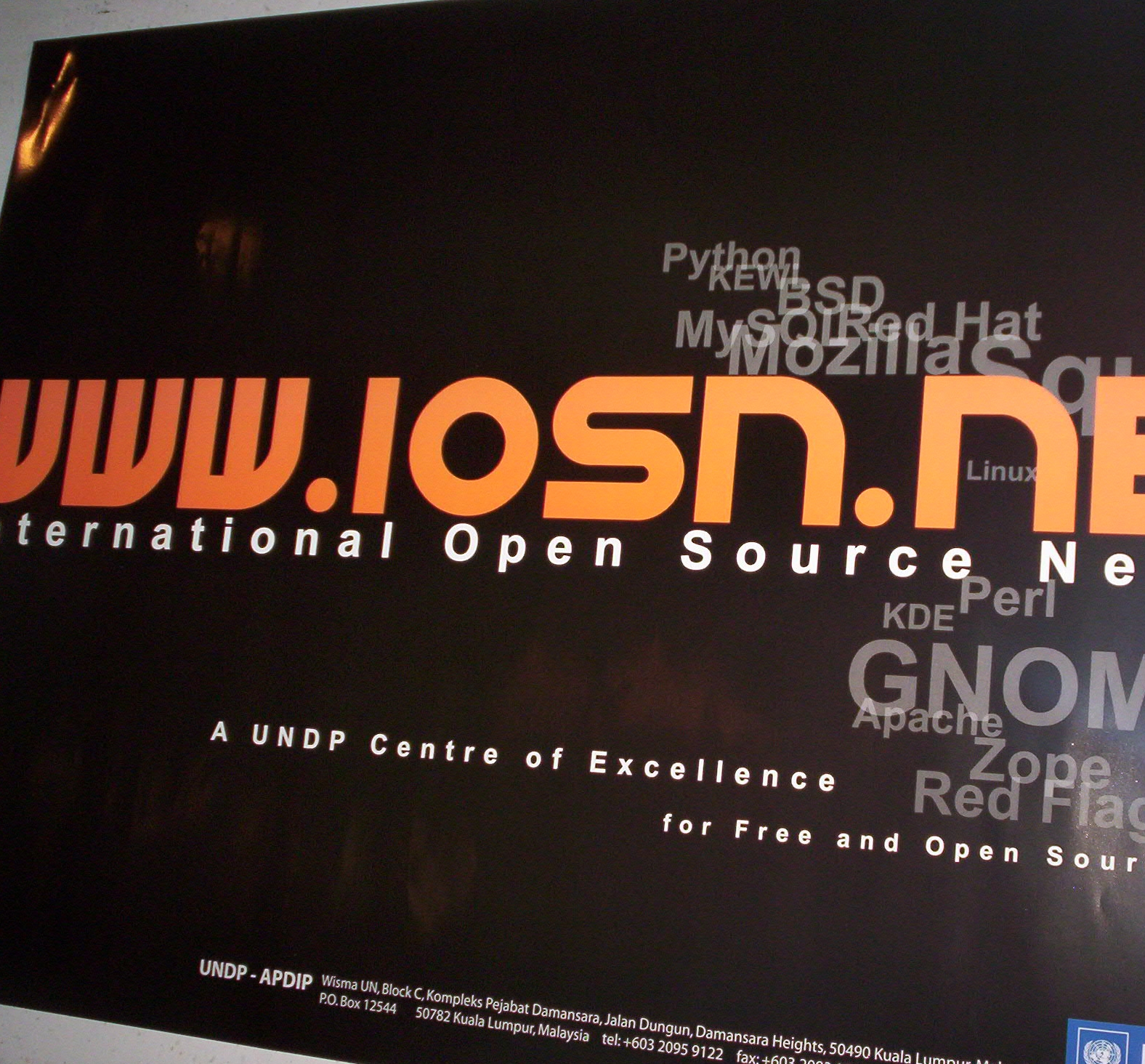
IOSN, announcing its interests

The International Open Source Network (IOSN) had as its slogan "software freedom for all". It was a Centre of Excellence for free software (also known as FLOSS, FOSS, or open-source software) in the Asia-Pacific region.

IOSN said it "shapes its activities around FOSS technologies and applications". It was "tasked specifically to facilitate and network FOSS advocates and human resources in the region."

== FLOSS's perceived potential ==
IOSN's website said: "FOSS presents itself as an access solution for developing countries. It represents an opportunity for these countries to adopt affordable software and solutions towards bridging the digital divide. Only the use of FOSS permits sustainable development of software; it is technology that is free to learn about, maintain, adapt and reapply".

It explained its emphasis on Free and Open Source Software for the following reasons:

- Universal access to software without restrictions.
- Less dependence on imported technology.
- Freedom to share and collaborate in development efforts.
- Freedom to customize software to local languages and cultures.
- Development of local software capacity.
- Open standards and vendor independence.

Beginning in 2008, IOSN was managed from three centers of excellence: University of the Philippines Manila (ASEAN+3), CDAC in Chennai, India (South Asia), and a consortium composed of members from the academe and government in the Pacific Island Countries (PIC).

== IOSN objectives ==
IOSN's objectives included:

- Serve as a clearing house for information on FOSS in the Asia-Pacific region.
- Strengthen current FOSS capacities.
- Assist with the development of needed toolkits and resource materials, including localisation efforts.
- Assist in the coordination of FOSS programmes and initiatives through information sharing and networking in the Asia-Pacific region.

== Affiliations and sponsorships ==
IOSN was an initiative of the UNDP Asia-Pacific Development Information Programme and is supported by the International Development Research Centre (IDRC).
