= InWEnt =

InWEnt – Capacity Building International
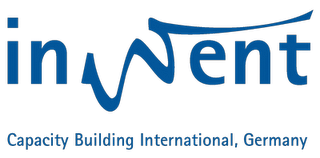
- Company type: Non-profit (gGmbH)
- Industry: International development, capacity building
- Founded: 2002
- Founder: Merger of Deutsche Stiftung für internationale Entwicklung (DSE) and Carl-Duisberg-Gesellschaft e.V. (CDG)
- Defunct: 2011
- Headquarters: Bonn, Germany
- Area served: Worldwide
- Products: Advanced training programs, international networking, dialogue events, e-learning platforms, alumni programs
- Revenue: ~136 million EUR (2008)
- Owner: Federal Republic of Germany, Carl Duisberg Gesellschaft e.V., Deutsche Stiftung für Internationale Entwicklung
- Number of employees: 797 (2008)
- Parent: Merged into Deutsche Gesellschaft für Internationale Zusammenarbeit (GIZ) in 2011

InWEnt - Capacity Building International (Internationale Weiterbildung und Entwicklung gGmbH) was a German institution with worldwide operations in the field of bilateral development cooperation and international cooperation, with a focus on capacity building.

InWEnt was formed in 2002 as a fusion of the 'Deutsche Stiftung für internationale Entwicklung (DSE)' and the 'Carl-Duisberg-Gesellschaft e.V. (CDG)'. In 2011, it was merged with the German Development Service (Deutscher Entwicklungsdienst, DED) and the German Technical Cooperation (Deutsche Gesellschaft für Technische Zusammenarbeit, GTZ), into the Deutsche Gesellschaft für Internationale Zusammenarbeit (German Agency for International Cooperation) or GIZ.

InWEnt was mainly active in the field of human resource development, through advanced training programmes, international networking, and dialogue events. Its programmes were directed at experts, executives and policymakers in government, administration, the business community and civil society worldwide. InWEnt provided participants on its courses with tools for further networking, and for lifelong learning, through e-learning platforms (Global Campus 21 and InWEnt e-Academy) and alumni programmes. Its alumni activities encompassed two online networking platforms: Alumniportal Deutschland and InWEnt Global Connect. Numerous former participants are in key positions in the economy and policy fields of their home countries today. Through several exchange programmes, InWEnt also offered international exposure for young Germans.

In 2008, a staff of 797 was working out of 30 offices in Germany and abroad, with its headquarters in Bonn. According to its 2008 annual report, the annual budget was about 136 million Euros (in 2008). Carl Duisberg-Gesellschaft existed until it merged with DSE to form Internationale Weiterbildung und Entwicklung gGmbH in 2002. By that time, about 300,000 people had participated in CDG programs. The budget ended up being about 100 million euros, raised by about 750 donors.

InWEnt was a non-profit organisation (gGmbH) owned by the Federal Republic of Germany, the Carl Duisberg Gesellschaft e. V. (CDG), and the German Foundation for International Development (DSE). Most of its programmes were commissioned by the German government through the Federal Ministry for Economic Cooperation and Development (BMZ).

== See also ==
- Alumniportal Germany
- Capacity building
- Deutsche Gesellschaft für Internationale Zusammenarbeit
- Federal Ministry for Economic Cooperation and Development
