= Deutsche Gesellschaft für Internationale Zusammenarbeit =

German government international aid agency

Deutsche Gesellschaft für Internationale Zusammenarbeit (GIZ) GmbH
- Abbreviation: GIZ
- Formation: 1 January 2011; 15 years ago
- Type: Federal Enterprise
- Legal status: GmbH
- Location(s): Bonn and Eschborn, Germany
- Chair of the Management Board: Thorsten Schäfer-Gümbel
- Budget: €3.3 billion (2020)
- Staff: 24,977 (31.12.2021)
- Website: www.giz.de/en

The Deutsche Gesellschaft für Internationale Zusammenarbeit (GIZ, lit. 'German Society for International Cooperation') is the main development agency of Germany. It is headquartered in Bonn and Eschborn and provides services in the field of international development cooperation and international education work. The organization's self-declared goal is to deliver effective solutions that offer people better prospects and sustainably improve their living conditions.

GIZ's main commissioning party is Germany's Federal Ministry for Economic Cooperation and Development (BMZ). Other commissioners include other German government ministries, European Union institutions, the United Nations, the private sector, and governments of other countries. In its projects GIZ works with partners in national governments, actors from the private sector, civil society and research institutions. Additionally, in cooperation with the German Federal Employment Agency, GIZ operates the Centre for International Migration and Development (CIM), an agency specialized on international cooperation activities related to global labor mobility.

GIZ was established on 1 January 2011, through the merger of three German international development organizations: the Deutscher Entwicklungsdienst (DED), the Deutsche Gesellschaft für Technische Zusammenarbeit (GTZ), and Internationale Weiterbildung und Entwicklung (InWEnt). The merger was overseen by Dirk Niebel, federal development minister from 2009 to 2013. His predecessor had previously tried and failed to merge the DED with the KfW. GIZ is one of the world's largest development agencies, with a business volume in excess of €3.1 billion in 2019 as well as 22,199 employees spread over more than 120 countries.

== Organisation ==
GIZ's headquarters are located in Bonn and Eschborn. It also has an office in Berlin and at 16 other locations across Germany. Outside Germany, the company has a representation in Brussels and operates 90 offices around the world.

Because GIZ is incorporated under German law as a GmbH (limited liability company), it is governed by a management board that acts on behalf of the company's shareholders and is monitored by a supervisory board. Additionally, GIZ also has a board of trustees and a Private Sector Advisory Board. GIZ's management board consists of two managing directors, namely Thorsten Schäfer-Gümbel (Chairperson) and Ingrid-Gabriela Hoven.

Thorsten Schäfer-Gümbel, a former Social Democrat local politician, was previously one of three managing directors. Prior to him, the inaugural chairperson was Tanja Gönner, a former state-level minister of the Christian Democrats, who left politics during protests against the Stuttgart 21 train station project. She came to GIZ without prior experience in international development. She left GIZ in November 2022 to lead the German industry lobby BDI.

The Federal Republic of Germany (represented by the Federal Ministry for Economic Cooperation and Development (BMZ) and the Federal Ministry of Finance (BMF)) is GIZ's sole shareholder. The organization is structured into eight corporate units (Corporate Development; Corporate Communications; Legal Affairs and Insurance; Compliance and Integrity; Auditing; Evaluation; Corporate Security; Academy for International Cooperation (AIZ)) and ten departments (Commissioning Parties and Business Development; Sectoral Development; Sector and Global Programmes; Africa; Asia, Latin America, Caribbean; Europe, Mediterranean, Central Asia; International Services; Human Resources).

GIZ holds a 49% share in sequa gGmbH, the implementing partner of the German business community, in line with the company's objective to foster private sector development and cooperate closely with business chambers and associations abroad. Moreover, GIZ is a member of the European Network of Implementing Development Agencies (EUNIDA), which was co-founded by GTZ in 2000.

== Activities ==
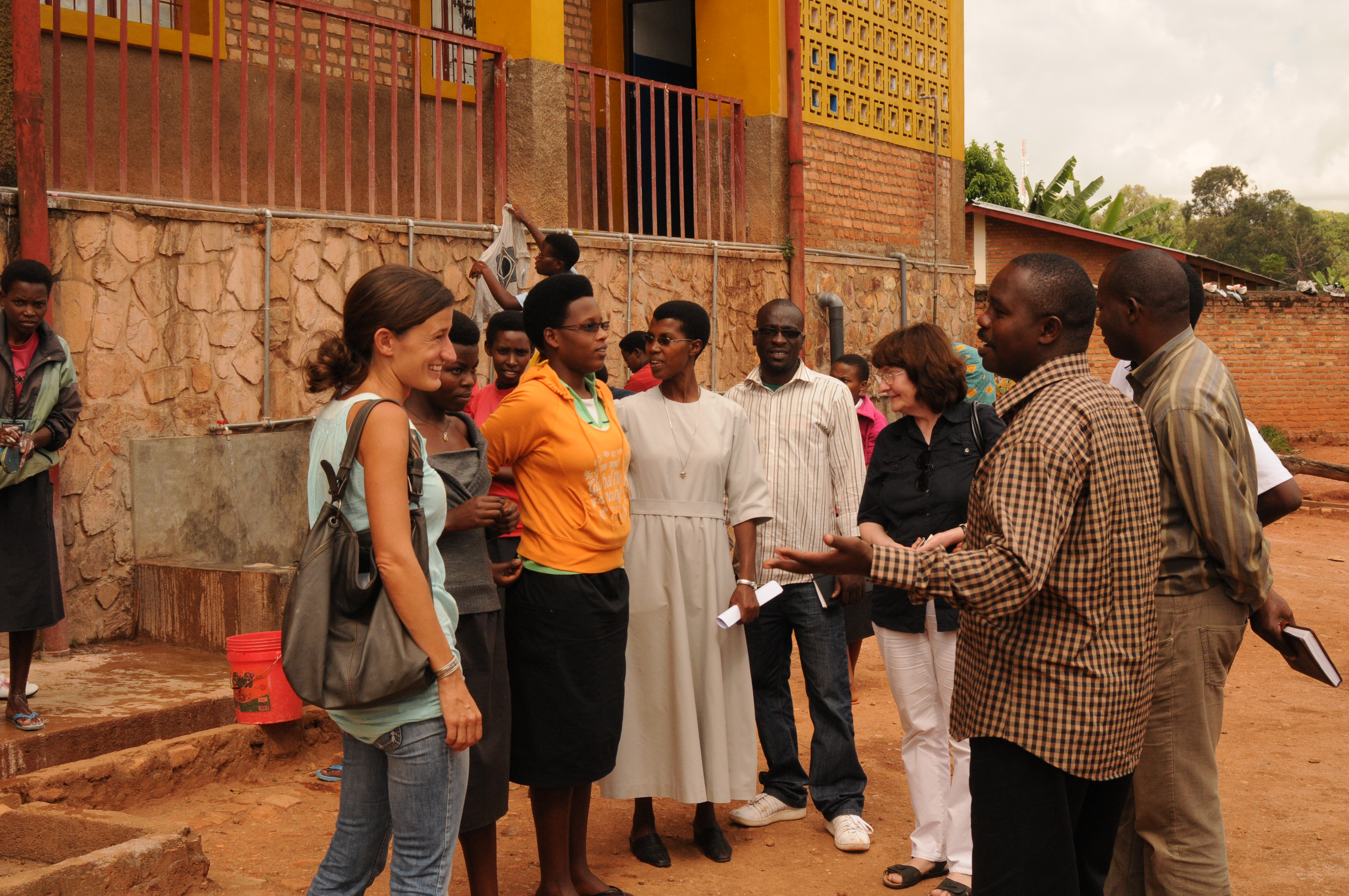
Staff members of GIZ and KfW together with local partners visit a project at a school in Gitega, Burundi

GIZ's considers capacity development to be its core discipline.

GIZ has been involved in the creation of various networks, associations and portals, and may carry out or support secretariat functions for some of these for a limited period of time. Examples of such networks and associations that have had some GIZ involvement include:

- Renewable Energy Policy Network for the 21st Century (REN21)
- BIOPAT
- Alumniportal Germany
- Sustainable Sanitation Alliance

Other global agendas supported by GIZ include South-South cooperation, i.e. bilateral cooperation between developing countries and emerging economies, and triangular cooperation between developing countries as beneficiaries, emerging economies as "new donors" and traditional donors, e.g. Germany, as contributors of expertise. For example GIZ remains at the forefront as a development partner of the Caribbean Association of Investment Promotion Agencies (CAIPA). The GIZ was also one of the first major development agencies to integrate sport-based approaches in its work, with sport projects dating back to the mid-70s. Through both the sport-specific sector programme, as well as the integration of sport-based approaches in other sectors, the GIZ has implemented related activities in 34 countries since 1996.

GIZ works closely with the German government-owned development bank KfW, which is based in Frankfurt. While GIZ implements those projects on behalf of the BMZ that belong to "technical cooperation", i.e. capacity development, the KfW implements those BMZ projects belonging to "financial cooperation".

GIZ is currently represented in the SuRe® Stakeholder Council. SuRe® – The Standard for Sustainable and Resilient Infrastructure is a global voluntary standard which integrates key criteria of sustainability and resilience into infrastructure development and upgrade. SuRe® is developed by GIB Foundation and Natixis as part of a multi-stakeholder process and will be compliant with ISEAL guidelines.

Finally, GIZ also hosts the Eschborn Dialogue, a two-day event for international experts on a given topic in international cooperation (e.g. "World in motion: mobility, migration, digital change" in 2014 or "Raw materials and resources: growth, values, competition" in 2013). The Eschborn Dialogue has been organized each year since 1988.

== Controversy ==
In 2021, German troops ended their presence in Afghanistan. Since then, the Taliban have taken over the country and persecuted former staff of foreign states, including former local staff of Germany. This led Germany to allow some local staff to immigrate. However, GIZ continued hiring new local staff in Afghanistan, and was criticised for this in 2022.

The GIZ continued to draw criticism for its spending. The Bundesrechnungshof concluded in 2023, that the GIZ does not produce data that allow to evaluate its economic efficiency. There were no mechanisms in place to encourage cost cutting and the Court of Audit noted, that some of the numbers for controlling had apparently been designed especially to allow higher bonuses every year for the 3 GIZ directors. In 2019 Thorsten Schäfer-Gümbel became a board member and got paid 230.000 Euros in 2022, which increased to 242.000 Euros per year in 2023, plus pension claims.

In March 2024, Baraa Odeh, a Palestinian GIZ employee of 10 years, was arrested by Israeli border guards after a trip, administratively detained for three months without charge, and subjected to abusive and humiliating treatment. GIZ stated it would work "with all the means at its disposal to clarify the background." Germany's development ministry commented: "The Federal Government is critical of the practice of administrative detention – [...] International humanitarian law sets strict limits on this practice."

== Commissioning Parties ==
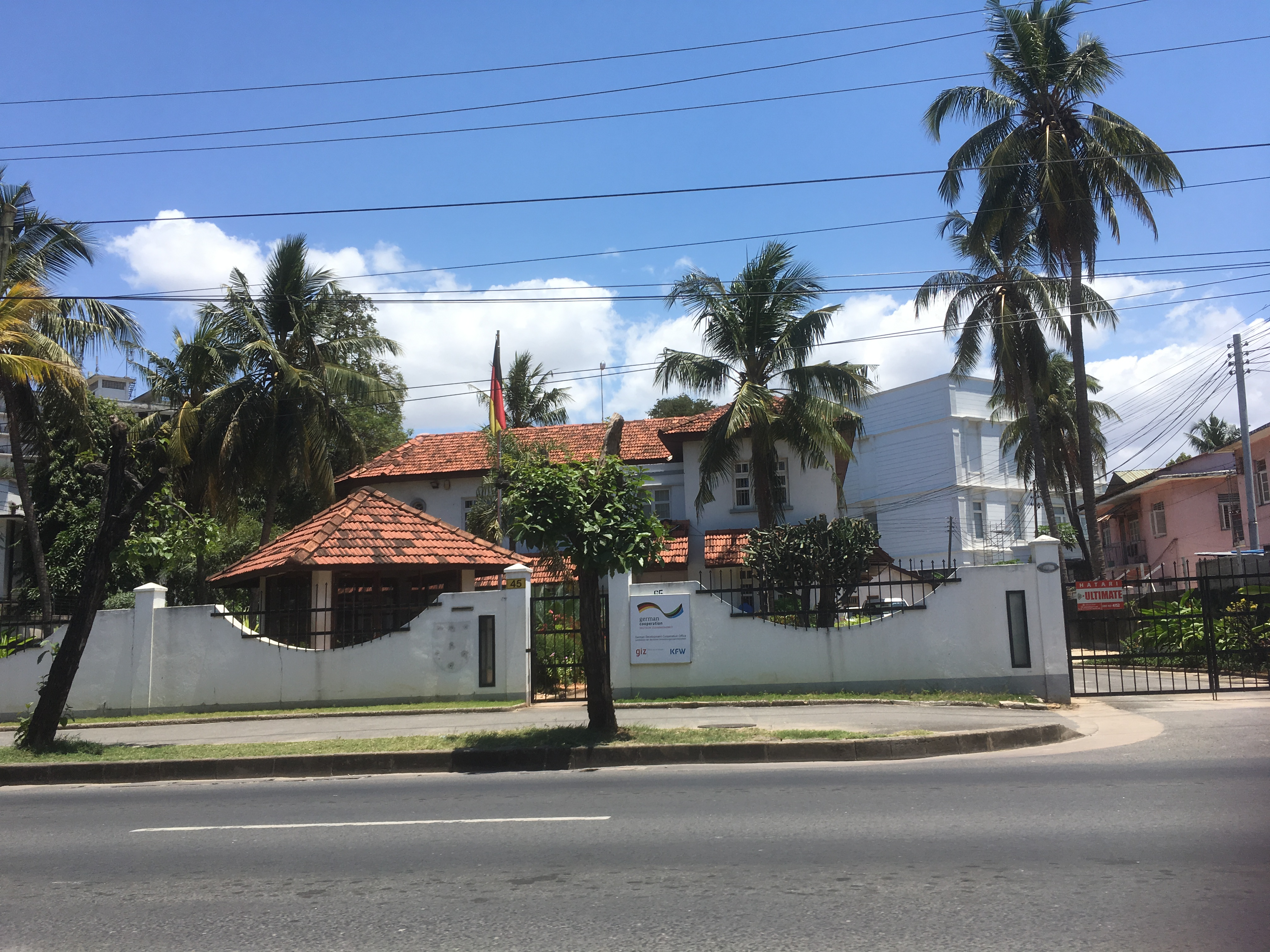
GIZ Office in Dar es Salaam, Tanzania

GIZ mainly operates on behalf of the Federal Ministry for Economic Cooperation and Development (BMZ). At the national level, GIZ, however, is also commissioned by other government departments, e.g. the Federal Foreign Office, the Federal Ministry for the Environment (BMU), or the Federal Ministry for Economic Affairs and Energy (BMWi), as well as by German states and municipalities. At the international level, GIZ cooperates with the European Union, UN agencies, other international institutions such as the Global Fund to Fight AIDS, Tuberculosis and Malaria (GFFATM), and foreign governments. The cooperation with private enterprises is an emerging field, promoted under the name of sustainable development. The GIZ is set up with International Services (IS) and the Public Private Partnership (PPP) in this area.

== Staff ==
In 2024, the GIZ employed 24,530 staff members in around 120 countries. Close to 70 percent are local forces that are complemented by development aid workers as well as experts from the Centrum für internationale Migration und Entwicklung that helps to integrate employees into the workforce in developing countries. The majority (80%) of employees work outside of Germany.

The GIZ operates in a variety of countries with different security situations. Staff of the GIZ is exposed to the particular security situation of the country they work in and have therefore been exposed to violence in the past including abduction as well as other violent acts (e.g. abduction in Afghanistan in 2015 or fatal assault in Niger in 2018).

== See also ==
- List of development aid agencies
- Local Government ICT Network (South Africa)
