= Aid =

Voluntary transfer of resources from one country to another

Foreign aid received per capita

In international relations, aid (also known as international aid, overseas aid, foreign aid, economic aid or foreign assistance) is – from the perspective of governments – a voluntary transfer of resources from one country to another. The type of aid given may be classified according to various factors, including its intended purpose, the terms or conditions (if any) under which it is given, its source, and its level of urgency. For example, aid may be classified based on urgency into emergency aid and development aid.

Emergency aid is rapid assistance given to a people in immediate distress by individuals, organizations, or governments to relieve suffering, during and after man-made emergencies (like wars) and natural disasters. Development aid is aid given to support development in general which can be economic development or social development in developing countries. It is distinguished from humanitarian aid as being aimed at alleviating poverty in the long term, rather than alleviating suffering in the short term.

Aid may serve one or more functions: it may be given as a signal of diplomatic approval, or to strengthen a military ally, to reward a government for behavior desired by the donor, to extend the donor's cultural influence, to provide infrastructure needed by the donor for resource extraction from the recipient country, or to gain other kinds of commercial access. Countries may provide aid for further diplomatic reasons. Humanitarian and altruistic purposes are often reasons for foreign assistance. (Note: Lancaster, pp. 4–5.)

== Donors ==
Aid may be given by individuals, private organizations, or governments. Standards delimiting exactly the types of transfers considered "aid" vary from country to country. For example, the United States government discontinued the reporting of military aid as part of its foreign aid figures in 1958. (Note: Lancaster, p. 67: "In 1957 the administration (with congressional support) separated economic from military assistance and created a Development Loan Fund (DLF) to provide concessional credits to developing countries world-wide (i.e. not, as in the past, just those in areas of potential conflict with Moscow) to promote their long-term growth.")

== Classification of Flows ==
Flows of aid are commonly classified into three categories:

1. "Official Development Assistance" (ODA). The largest by volume of the three categories, consisting of grants, debt relief, zero interest loans, or concessional (below market rate) loans given to developing countries or multilateral institutions to promote welfare and economic development (OECD, 1972).

2. Other Official Flows (OOF). Other loans and grants that do not fit the definition of ODA, including military aid and export credits.

3. Private Flows, often financed out of external private sector resources and private grants (ie. grants by non-governmental organizations and other private bodies).

== Definitions and purpose ==
The Development Assistance Committee of the Organisation for Economic Co-operation and Development defines its aid measure, Official Development Assistance (ODA), as follows: "ODA consists of flows to developing countries and multilateral institutions provided by official agencies, including state and local governments, or by their executive agencies, each transaction of which meets the following test: a) it is administered with the promotion of the economic development and welfare of developing countries as its main objective, and b) it is concessional in character and contains a grant element of at least 25% (calculated at a rate of discount of 10%)." Foreign aid has increased since the 1950s and 1960s (Isse 129). The notion that foreign aid increases economic performance and generates economic growth is based on Chenery and Strout's Dual Gap Model (Isse 129). Chenerya and Strout (1966) claimed that foreign aid promotes development by adding to domestic savings as well as to foreign exchange availability, this helping to close either the savings-investment gap or the export-import gap. (Isse 129).

Carol Lancaster defines foreign aid as "a voluntary transfer of public resources, from a government to another independent government, to an NGO, or to an international organization (such as the World Bank or the UN Development Program) with at least a 25 percent grant element, one goal of which is to better the human condition in the country receiving the aid." (Note: Carol Lancaster. Foreign Aid. 2007. p.9.)

Foreign aid given per capita

Foreign aid received as a share of national income net

Foreign aid received net

Foreign aid given as a share of national income

Foreign aid given net

Foreign aid given grant equivalents

== Types ==
The type of aid given may be classified according to various factors, including its level of urgency and intended purpose, or the terms or conditions (if any) under which it is given.

Aid from various sources can reach recipients through bilateral or multilateral delivery systems. Bilateral refers to government to government transfers. Multilateral institutions, such as the World Bank or UNICEF, pool aid from one or more sources and disperse it among many recipients.

=== By urgency and intended purpose ===
Aid may be also classified based on urgency into emergency aid and development aid. Emergency aid is rapid assistance given to a people in immediate distress by individuals, organizations, or governments to relieve suffering, during and after man-made emergencies (like wars) and natural disasters. The term often carries an international connotation, but this is not always the case. It is often distinguished from development aid by being focused on relieving suffering caused by natural disaster or conflict, rather than removing the root causes of poverty or vulnerability. Development aid is aid given to support development in general which can be economic development or social development in developing countries. It is distinguished from humanitarian aid as being aimed at alleviating poverty in the long term, rather than alleviating suffering in the short term.

Official aid may be classified by types according to its intended purpose. Military aid is material or logistical assistance given to strengthen the military capabilities of an ally country.

==== Humanitarian aid and emergency aid ====
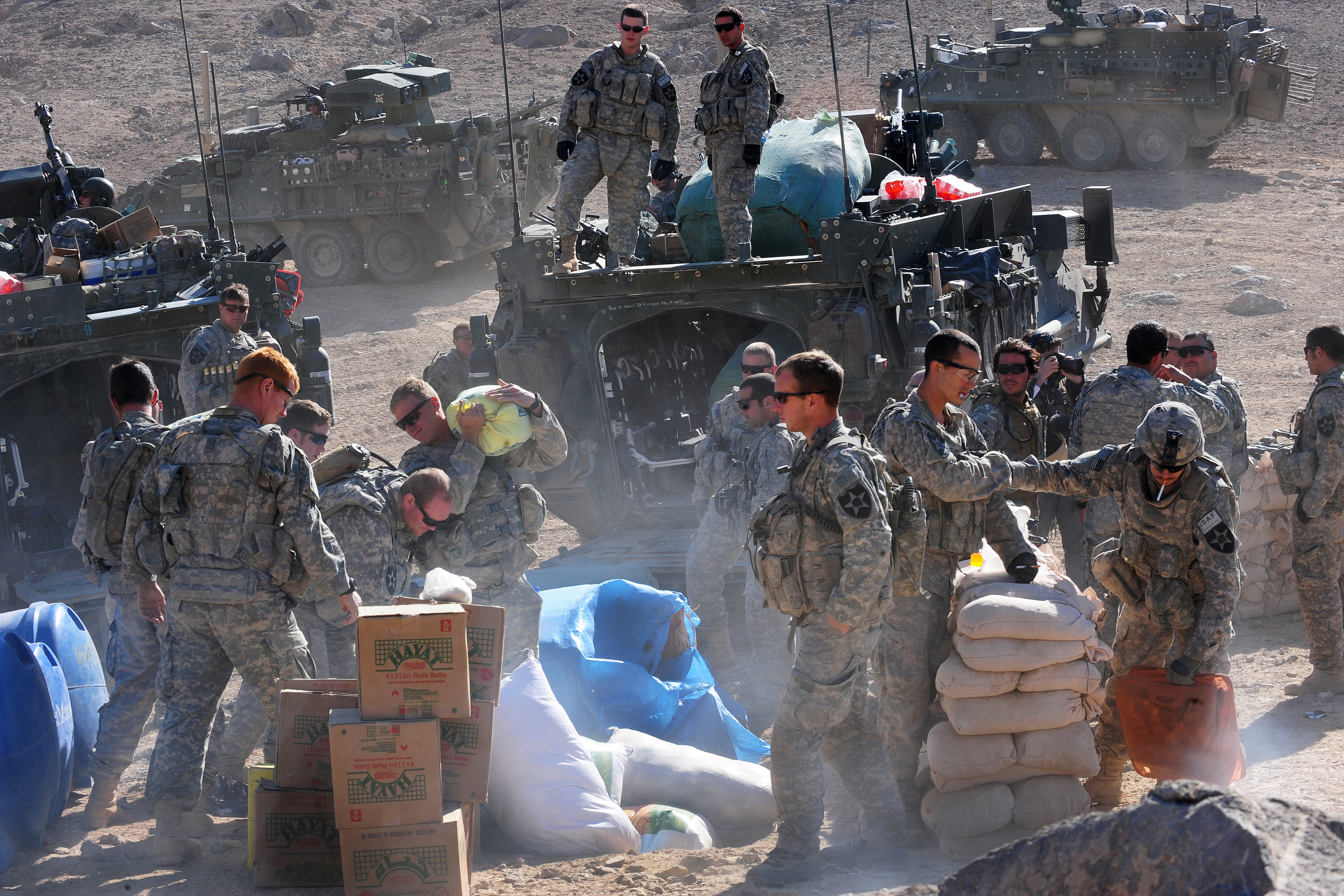
U.S. soldiers unload humanitarian aid for distribution to the town of Rajan Kala, Afghanistan, 5 December 2009

Humanitarian aid is material or logistical assistance provided for humanitarian purposes, typically in response to humanitarian crises such as a natural disaster or a man-made disaster.

The provision of emergency humanitarian aid consists of the provision of vital services (such as food aid to prevent starvation) by aid agencies, and the provision of funding or in-kind services (like logistics or transport), usually through aid agencies or the government of the affected country. Humanitarian aid is distinguished from humanitarian intervention, which involves armed forces protecting civilians from violent oppression or genocide by state-supported actors.

The United Nations Office for the Coordination of Humanitarian Affairs (OCHA) is mandated to coordinate the international humanitarian response to a natural disaster or complex emergency acting on the basis of the United Nations General Assembly Resolution 46/182. The Geneva Conventions give a mandate to the International Committee of the Red Cross and other impartial humanitarian organizations to provide assistance and protection of civilians during times of war. The ICRC, has been given a special role by the Geneva Conventions with respect to the visiting and monitoring of prisoners of war.

==== Development aid ====
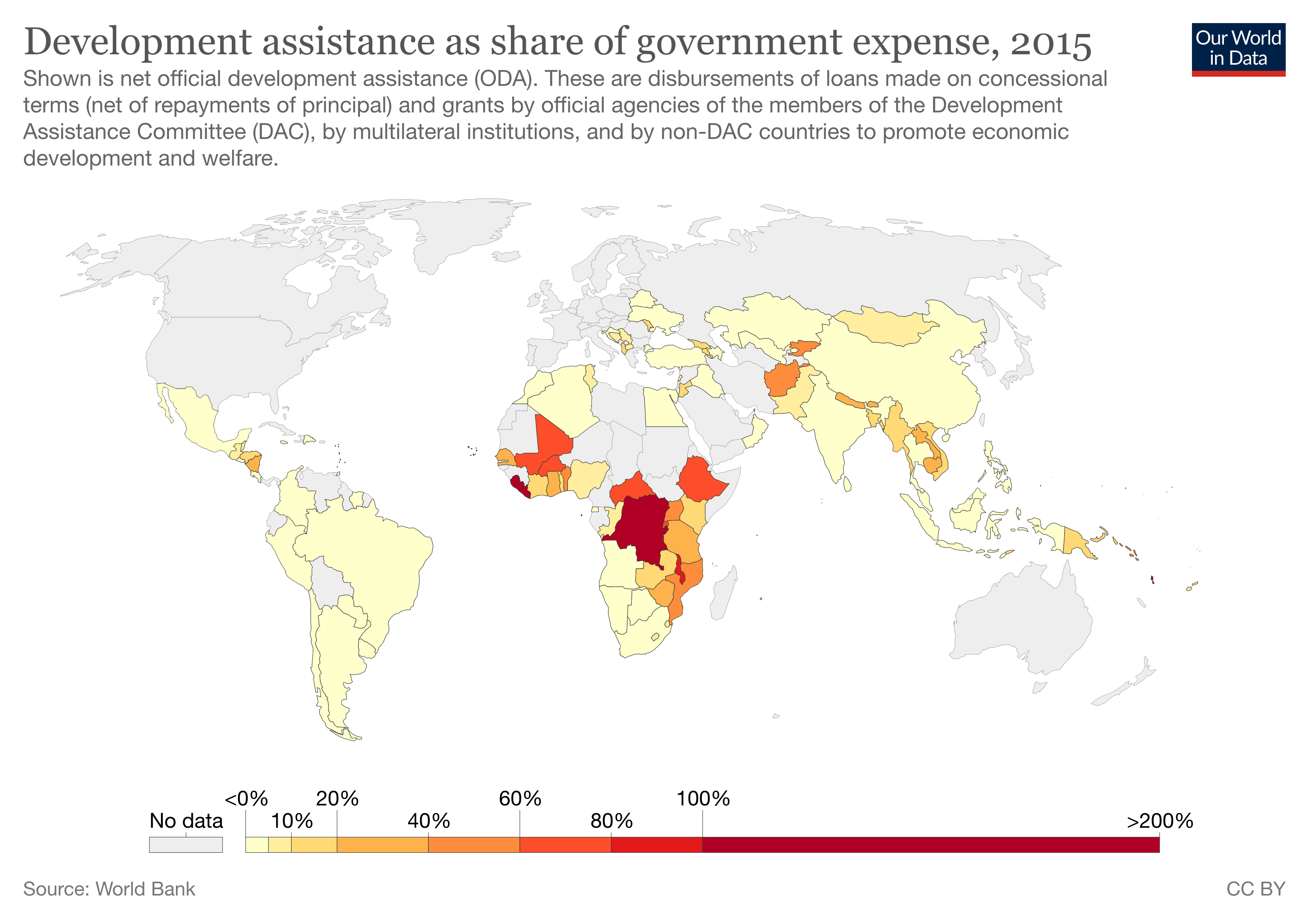
Development aid as share of government budget. (2015, OWID)

Development aid is given by governments through individual countries' international aid agencies and through multilateral institutions such as the World Bank, and by individuals through development charities. For donor nations, development aid also has strategic value; improved living conditions can positively effects global security and economic growth. Official Development Assistance (ODA) is a commonly used measure of developmental aid.

Technical assistance is a sub-type of development aid. It is aid involving highly educated or trained personnel, such as doctors, who are moved into a developing country to assist with a program of development. It can be both programme and project aid.

=== By terms or conditions of receipt ===
Aid can also be classified according to the terms agreed upon by the donor and receiving countries. In this classification, aid can be a gift, a grant, a low or no interest loan, or a combination of these. The terms of foreign aid are oftentimes influenced by the motives of the giver: a sign of diplomatic approval, to reward a government for behaviour desired by the donor, to extend the donor's cultural influence, to enhance infrastructure needed by the donor for the extraction of resources from the recipient country, or to gain other kinds of commercial access.

=== Other types ===
Aid given is generally intended to be used for a specific end. From this perspective it may be called:

- Project aid: Aid given for a specific purpose; e.g. building materials for a new school.
- Programme aid: Aid given for a specific sector; e.g. funding of the education sector of a country.
  - Budget support: A form of programme aid that is directly channelled into the financial system of the recipient country.
- Sector-wide approaches (SWAPs): A combination of project aid and programme aid/budget support within a particular sector. An example would be support for the education sector in a country that includes both funding of education projects (like school buildings) and funds to maintain them (like ongoing purchasing of school books).
- Food aid: Food provided to people in need of it, whether by importing food, buying food locally, or providing cash or vouchers. This may be during or after an armed conflict or disaster, or as part of ongoing initiatives like school meals. The world’s largest provider of food aid and school meals is the World Food Programme.
- Faith-based foreign aid: aid that originates in institutions of a religious nature (some examples are, Salvation Army, Catholic Relief Services).
- Private giving: International aid in the form of gifts by individuals or businesses are generally administered by charities or philanthropic organizations who batch them and then channel these to the recipient country.

== Scale ==
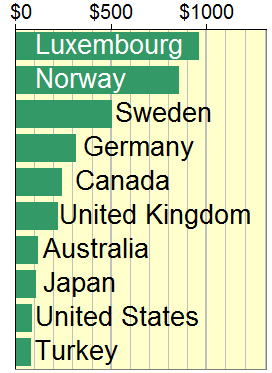
Chart showing foreign aid given per capita in USD, by selected major countries with high donation rates

Most official development assistance (ODA) comes from the 30 members of the Development Assistance Committee (DAC), or about $150 billion in 2018. For the same year, the OECD estimated that six to seven billion dollars of ODA-like aid was given by ten other states, including China and India.

=== Top 10 aid recipient countries (2009–2018) ===
Foreign aid received (2009–2018)
Country	US dollars (billions)
Afghanistan	51.8
Syrian Arab Republic	44.4
Ethiopia	37.9
Vietnam	32.0
Congo, Dem. Rep.	28.7
Pakistan	27.5
Tanzania	27.4
Turkey	25.2
Kenya	24.1

=== Top 10 aid donor countries (2020) ===
Official development assistance (in absolute terms) contributed by the top 10 DAC countries is as follows. European Union countries together gave $75,838,040,000 and EU Institutions gave a further $19.4 billion. The European Union accumulated a higher portion of GDP as a form of foreign aid than any other economic union.

1. European Union – $75.8 billion
2. United States – $34.6 billion
3. Germany – $23.8 billion
4. United Kingdom – $19.4 billion
5. Japan – $15.5 billion
6. France – $12.2 billion
7. Sweden – $5.4 billion
8. Netherlands – $5.3 billion
9. Italy – $4.9 billion
10. Canada – $4.7 billion
11. Norway – $4.3 billion

Official development assistance as a percentage of gross national income contributed by the top 10 DAC countries is as follows. Five countries met the longstanding UN target for an ODA/GNI ratio of 0.7% in 2013:

1. Norway – 1.07%
2. Sweden – 1.02%
3. Luxembourg – 1.00%
4. Denmark – 0.85%
5. United Kingdom – 0.72%
6. Netherlands – 0.67%
7. Finland – 0.55%
8. Switzerland – 0.47%
9. Belgium – 0.45%
10. Ireland – 0.45%

European Union countries that are members of the Development Assistance Committee gave 0.42% of GNI (excluding the $15.93 billion given by EU Institutions).

== By nation ==
- Australian Agency for International Development
- Canadian foreign aid
- China foreign aid
- Indian foreign aid
- Israeli foreign aid
- Foreign aid institutions of Japan
- Qatari foreign aid
- Saudi foreign assistance
- Swedish International Development Cooperation Agency
- Department for International Development (United Kingdom)
- United States foreign aid

== Quantifying aid ==
=== Official development assistance ===
Official development assistance (ODA) is a term coined by the Development Assistance Committee (DAC) of the Organisation for Economic Co-operation and Development (OECD) to measure aid. ODA refers to aid from national governments for promoting economic development and welfare in low and middle income countries. ODA can be bilateral or multilateral. This aid is given as either grants, where no repayment is required, or as concessional loans, where interest rates are lower than market rates. (Note: Lancaster uses either ODA or ODA plus OA ("Official Assistance" – another DAC government-aid category) as her main statistic. She considers it better to add the OA but very often just uses the ODA figure alone; e.g., for Table 1.1 (p. 13), Table 2.2 (p. 39) and Table 2.3 (p. 43). In any case the difference is now moot since the DAC recently merged the two categories.)

Loan repayments to multilateral institutions are pooled and redistributed as new loans. Additionally, debt relief, partial or total cancellation of loan repayments, is often added to total aid numbers even though it is not an actual transfer of funds. It is compiled by the Development Assistance Committee. The United Nations, the World Bank, and many scholars use the DAC's ODA figure as their main aid figure because it is easily available and reasonably consistently calculated over time and between countries. The DAC classifies aid in three categories:

- Official Development Assistance (ODA): Development aid provided to developing countries (on the "Part I" list) and international organizations with the clear aim of economic development.
- Official Aid (OD): Development aid provided to developed countries (on the "Part II" list).
- Other Official Flows (OOF): Aid which does not fall into the other two categories, either because it is not aimed at development, or it consists of more than 75% loan (rather than grant).

Aid is often pledged at one point in time, but disbursements (financial transfers) might not arrive until later.

In 2009, South Korea became the first major recipient of ODA from the OECD to turn into a major donor. The country now provides over $1 billion in aid annually.

=== Not included as international aid ===
Most monetary flows between nations are not counted as aid. These include market-based flows such as foreign direct investments and portfolio investments, remittances from migrant workers to their families in their home countries, and military aid. In 2009, aid in the form of remittances by migrant workers in the United States to their international families was twice as large as that country's humanitarian aid. The World Bank reported that, worldwide, foreign workers sent $328 billion from richer to poorer countries in 2008, over twice as much as official aid flows from OECD members. The United States does not count military aid in its foreign aid figures.

== Improving aid effectiveness ==
Aid effectiveness is the degree of success or failure of international aid (development aid or humanitarian aid). Concern with aid effectiveness might be at a high level of generality (whether aid on average fulfils the main functions that aid is supposed to have), or it might be more detailed (considering relative degrees of success between different types of aid in differing circumstances).

Questions of aid effectiveness have been highly contested by academics, commentators and practitioners, and there is a large literature on the subject. Econometric studies in the late 20th century often found the average effectiveness of aid to be minimal or even negative. Such studies have appeared on the whole to yield more affirmative results in the early 21st century, but the picture is complex and far from clear in many respects.

Many prescriptions have been made about how to improve aid effectiveness. In 2003–2011, around four high level forums on aid effectiveness were held to elaborate a set of good practices concerning aid administration co-ordination and relations between donors and recipient countries. The Paris Declaration and other results of these forums embodied a broad consensus on what needed to be done to produce better development results. From 2011 this movement was subsumed in one concerned more broadly with effective development co-operation, largely embodied by the Global Partnership for Effective Development Co-operation.

== Criticism ==
=== Promoting poor governance ===
American political scientist and professor Nicolas van de Walle has also argued that despite more than two decades of donor-supported reform in Africa, the continent continues to be plagued by economic crises due to the combination of state generated factors and to the counter productivity of international development aid to Africa. Van de Walle posits that international aid has sustained economic stagnation in Africa by:

1. Pacifying Africa's neopatrimonial tendencies, thereby lessening the incentives for state elites to undertake reform and preserving the status quo.
2. Sustaining poorly managed bureaucratic structures and policies that would be otherwise rectified by market forces.
3. Allowing state capacities to deteriorate through externalizing many state functions and responsibilities.

In order for aid to be productive and for economic policy reform to be successfully implemented in Africa, the relationship between donors and governments must change. Van de Walle argues that aid must be made more conditional and selective to incentivize states to take on reform and to generate the much needed accountability and capacity in African governments.

==== Corruption ====
A 2020 article published in Studies in Comparative International Development analyzed contract-level data over the period 1998 through 2008 in more than a hundred recipient countries. As a risk indicator for corruption, the study used the prevalence of single bids submitted in "high-risk" competitive tenders for procurement contracts funded by World Bank development aid. ("High-risk" tenders are those with a higher degree of World Bank oversight and control; as a result, the study authors noted that "our findings are not representative of all aid spending financed by the World Bank, but only that part where risks are higher" and more stringent oversight thus deemed necessary.) The study authors found "that donor efforts to control corruption in aid spending through national procurement systems, by tightening oversight and increasing market openness, were effective in reducing corruption risks." The study also found that countries with high party system institutionalization (PSI) and countries with greater state capacity had lower prevalence of single bidding, lending support for "theories of corruption control based on reducing opportunities and increasing constraints on the power of public administrators."

A 2018 study published in the Journal of Public Economics investigated with Chinese aid projects in Africa increased local-level corruption. Matching Afrobarometer data (on perceptions of corruption) to georeferenced data on Chinese development finance project sites, the study found that active Chinese project sites had more widespread local corruption. The study found that the apparent increase in corruption did not appear to be driven by increased economic activity, but rather could be linked to a negative Chinese impact on norms (e.g., the legitimization of corruption). The study noted that: "Chinese aid stands out from World Bank aid in this respect. In particular, whereas the results indicate that Chinese aid projects fuel local corruption but have no observable impact on short term local economic activity, they suggest that World Bank aid projects stimulate local economic activity without any consistent evidence of it fuelling local corruption."

=== Promoting conflict ===
The effect of aid on conflict intensity and onset have been proved to have different impacts in different countries and situations. For instance, for the case of Colombia Dube and Naidu (2015) showed that Aid from the US seems to have been diverted to paramilitary groups, increasing political violence. Moreover, Nunn and Qian (2014) have found that an increase in U.S. food aid increases conflict intensity; they claim that the main mechanism driving this result is predation of the aid by the rebel groups. In fact, they note that aid can have the unintentional consequence of actually improving rebel groups' ability to continue conflict, as vehicles and communications equipment usually accompany the aid that is stolen. These tools improve the ability of rebel groups to organize and give them assets to trade for arms, possibly increasing the length of the fighting. Finally, Crost, Felter and Johnston (2014) have shown that a development program in the Philippines have had the unintended effect of increasing conflict because of a strategic retaliation from the rebel group, on where they tried to prevent that the development program increases support to the government.

=== Aid dependency ===
Aid dependency is defined as the "situation in which a country cannot perform many of the core functions of government, such as operations and maintenance, or the delivery of basic public services, without foreign aid funding and expertise". Aid has made many African countries and other poor regions incapable of achieving economic growth and development without foreign assistance. Most African economies have become dependent on aid and this is because foreign aid has become a significant norm of systems of international relations between high and low income countries across the globe.

Foreign aid makes African countries dependent on aid because it is regarded by policy makers as regular income, thus they do not have any incentive to make policies and decisions that will enable their countries to independently finance their economic growth and development. Additionally, aid does not incentivize the government to tax citizens, due to the constant inflow of foreign aid, and as a result, the citizens do not have any obligation to demand the provision of goods and services geared towards development.

Dambisa Moyo argues that aid does not lead to development, but rather creates problems including corruption, dependency, limitations on exports and Dutch disease, which negatively affect the economic growth and development of most African countries and other poor countries across the globe. Moyo devotes a section of her book, Dead Aid to rethinking the aid dependency model. She cautions that although "weaning governments off aid won't be easy", it is necessary. Primary among her prescriptions is a "capital solution" where African countries must enter the bond market to raise their capital for development, the interconnectedness that globalization has provided, will turn other "pools of money toward African markets in form of mutual funds, hedge funds, pension schemes" etc.

=== Deindustrialization ===
Foreign aid can contribute to deindustrialization. Foreign aid in the form of food aid that is given to poor countries or underdeveloped countries is responsible for the death of local farm industries in poor countries. Local farmers end up going out of business because they cannot compete with the abundance of cheap imported aid food, that is brought into poor countries as a response to humanitarian crisis and natural disasters. Large inflows of money that come into developing countries, from the developed world, in a foreign aid, increases the price of locally produced goods and products. Due to their high prices, export of local goods reduces. As a result, local industries and producers are forced to go out of business.

=== Ineffectiveness ===
Statistical studies have produced widely differing assessments of the correlation between aid and economic growth: there is little consensus with some studies finding a positive correlation while others find either no correlation or a negative correlation. One consistent finding is that project aid tends to cluster in richer parts of countries, meaning most aid is not given to poor countries or poor recipients.

Peter Singer argues that over the last three decades, "aid has added around one percentage point to the annual growth rate of the bottom billion." He argues that this has made the difference between "stagnation and severe cumulative decline." Aid can make progress towards reducing poverty worldwide, or at least help prevent cumulative decline. Despite the intense criticism on aid, there are some promising numbers. In 1990, approximately 43 percent of the world's population was living on less than $1.25 a day and has dropped to about 16 percent in 2008. Maternal deaths have dropped from 543,000 in 1990 to 287,000 in 2010. Under-five mortality rates have also dropped, from 12 million in 1990 to 6.9 million in 2011. Although these numbers alone sound promising, there is a gray overcast: many of these numbers actually are falling short of the Millennium Development Goals. There are only a few goals that have already been met or projected to be met by the 2015 deadline.

==== Effects depend on geography ====
Jeffery Sachs and his collaborators argue that in order for foreign aid to be successful, policy makers should "pay more attention to the developmental barriers associated with geography specifically, poor health, low agricultural productivity, and high transportation costs". The World Bank and the International Monetary Fund are two organizations that Sachs argues are currently instrumental in advising and directing foreign aid; however, he argues that these two organizations focus too much on "institutional reforms". Foreign aid is especially multifaceted in countries within Sub-Saharan Africa due to geographic barriers. Most macro foreign aid efforts fail to recognize these issues and, as Sachs argues, cause insufficient international aid and policy improvement. Sachs argues that unless foreign aid provides mechanisms that overcome geographic barriers, pandemics such as HIV and AIDS that cause traumatic casualties within regions such as Sub-Saharan Africa will continue to cause millions of fatalities.

=== Distorting incentives ===
The economist William Easterly and others have argued that aid can often distort incentives in poor countries in various harmful ways. Aid can also involve inflows of money to poor countries that have some similarities to inflows of money from natural resources that provoke the resource curse. This is partially because aid given in the form of foreign currency causes exchange rate to become less competitive and this impedes the growth of manufacturing sector which is more conducive in the cheap labour conditions. Aid also can take the pressure off and delay the painful changes required in the economy to shift from agriculture to manufacturing.

Some believe that aid is offset by other economic programs such as agricultural subsidies. Mark Malloch Brown, former head of the United Nations Development Program, estimated that farm subsidies cost poor countries about US$50 billion a year in lost agricultural exports:

It is the extraordinary distortion of global trade, where the West spends $360 billion a year on protecting its agriculture with a network of subsidies and tariffs that costs developing countries about US$50 billion in potential lost agricultural exports. Fifty billion dollars is the equivalent of today's level of development assistance.

Anthropologist and researcher Jason Hickel concludes from a 2016 report by the US-based Global Financial Integrity (GFI) and the Centre for Applied Research at the Norwegian School of Economics that

the usual development narrative has it backwards. Aid is effectively flowing in reverse. Rich countries aren't developing poor countries; poor countries are developing rich ones... The aid narrative begins to seem a bit naïve when we take these reverse flows into account. It becomes clear that aid does little but mask the maldistribution of resources around the world. It makes the takers seem like givers, granting them a kind of moral high ground while preventing those of us who care about global poverty from understanding how the system really works.

=== Ulterior agendas ===
Aid is seldom given from motives of pure altruism; for instance it is often given as a means of supporting an ally in international politics. It may also be given with the intention of influencing the political process in the receiving nation. Whether one considers such aid helpful may depend on whether one agrees with the agenda being pursued by the donor nation in a particular case. During the conflict between communism and capitalism in the twentieth century, the champions of those ideologies – the Soviet Union and the United States – each used aid to influence the internal politics of other nations, and to support their weaker allies. Perhaps the most notable example was the Marshall Plan by which the United States, largely successfully, sought to pull European nations toward capitalism and away from communism. Aid to underdeveloped countries has sometimes been criticized as being more in the interest of the donor than the recipient, or even a form of neocolonialism.

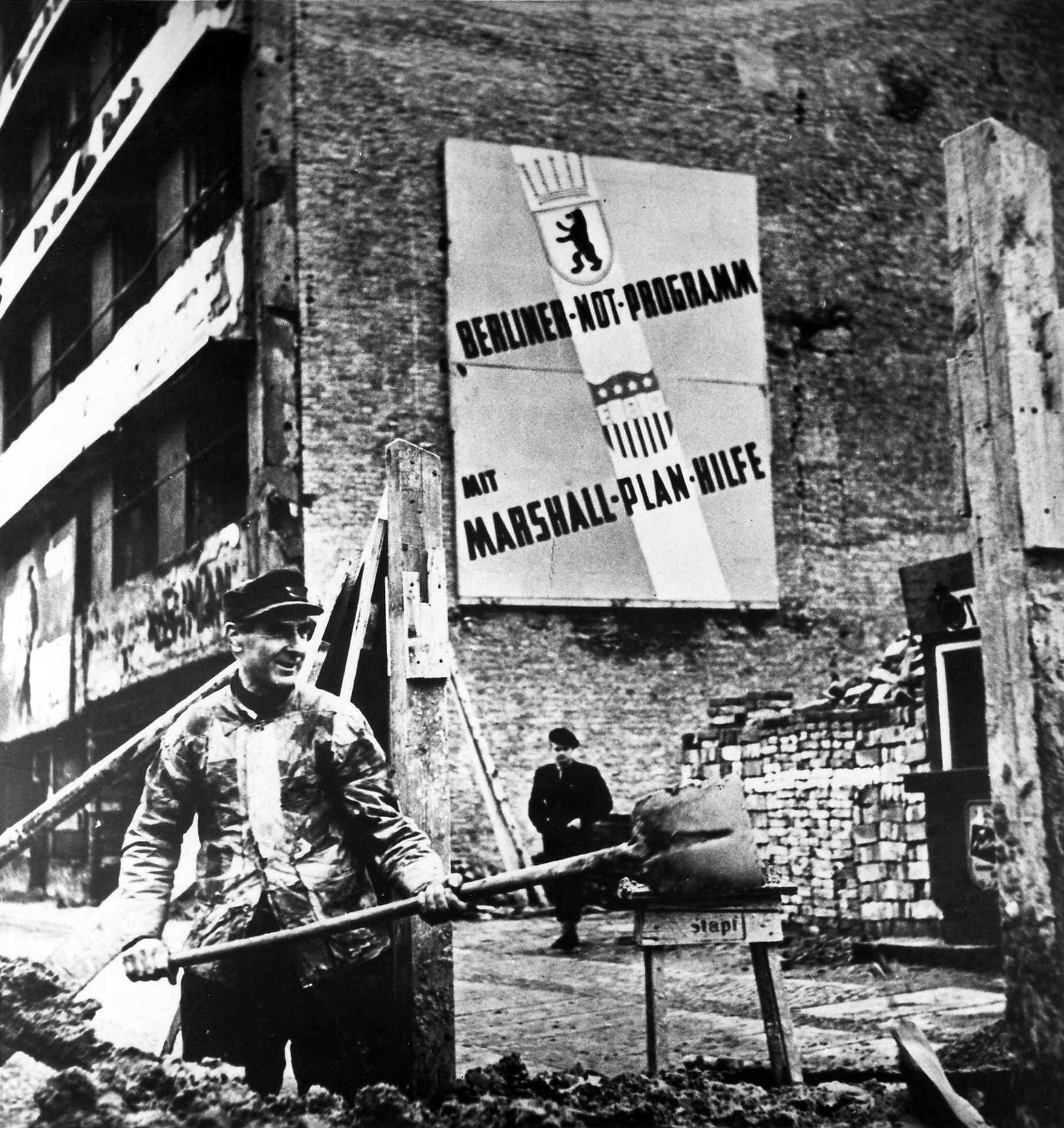
Marshall Plan aid to Germany, West Berlin, 1949

Some specific motives a donor may have for giving aid were listed in 1985 as follows: defence support, market expansion, foreign investment, missionary enterprise, cultural extension. In recent decades, aid by organizations such as the International Monetary Fund and the World Bank has been criticized as being primarily a tool used to open new areas up to global capitalists, and being only secondarily, if at all, concerned with the wellbeing of the people in the recipient countries.

=== Political bias ===
The practice of extending aid to politically aligned parties in recipient nations continues today; Faye and Niehaus (2012) are able to establish a causal relationship between politics and aid in recipient nations. In their analysis of the competitive 2006 Palestinian elections, they note that USAID provided funding for development programs in Palestine to support the Palestinian Authority, the US backed entity running for reelection. Faye and Niehaus discovered that the greater the degree of alignment the recipient party has with the donor entity, the more aid it receives on average during an election year. In an analysis of the three biggest donor nations (Japan, France, and the US), Alesina and Dollar (2000) discovered that each has its own distortions to the aid it gives out. Japan appears to prioritize giving aid nations that exercise similar voting preferences in the United Nations, France mostly sends aid to its former colonies, and the U.S. disproportionately provides aid to Israel and Egypt. These allocations are often powerful tools for maintaining the strategic interests of the donor country in the recipient country.

=== Vaccine diplomacy ===
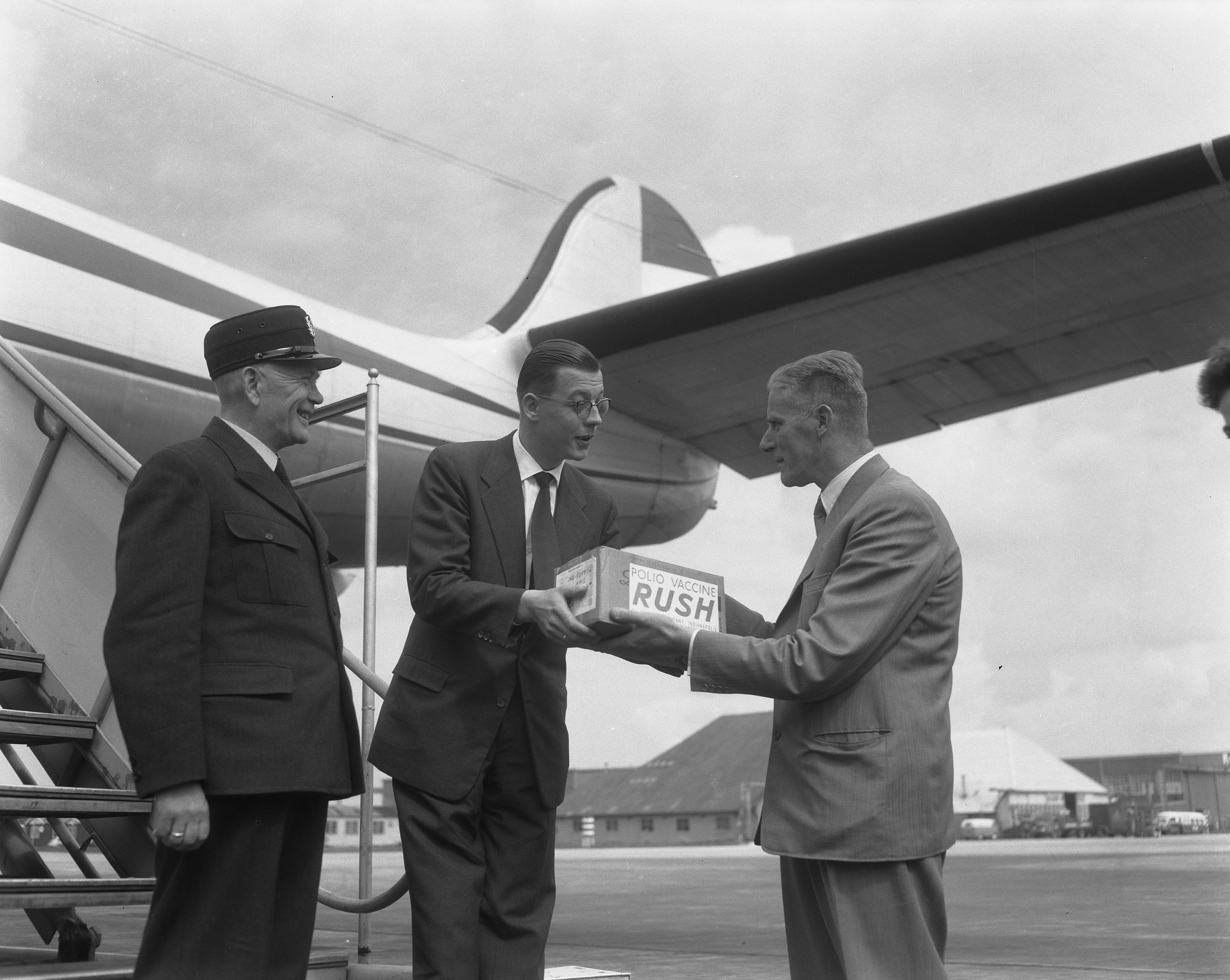
Arrival of Salk Polio Vaccine from the United States at Amsterdam Airport Schiphol in 1957.

Vaccine diplomacy, a form of medical diplomacy, is the use of vaccines to improve a country's diplomatic relationship and influence of other countries. Meanwhile, vaccine diplomacy also "means a set of diplomatic measures taken to ensure access to the best practices in the development of potential vaccines, to enhance bilateral and/or multilateral cooperation between countries in conducting joint R&D, and, in the case of the announcement of production, to ensure the signing of a contract for the purchase of the vaccine at the shortest term." Although primarily discussed in the context of the supply of COVID-19 vaccines, it also played a part in the distribution of the smallpox vaccine.

=== Policy incoherence ===
Some analysts, such as researchers at the Overseas Development Institute, argue that current support for developing countries suffers from a policy incoherence. While some policies are designed to support developing countries, other domestic policies undermine its impact, examples include:

- encouraging developing economies to develop their agriculture with a focus on exports is not effective on a global market where key players, such as the US and EU, heavily subsidise their products
- providing aid to developing economies' health sectors and the training of personnel is undermined by migration policies in developed countries that encourage the migration of skilled health professionals

One measure of this policy incoherence is the Commitment to Development Index (CDI) published by the Center for Global Development. The index measures and evaluates 22 of the world's richest countries on policies that affect developing countries, in addition to simply aid. It shows that development policy is more than just aid; it also takes into account trade, investment, migration, environment, security, and technology.

Thus, some states are seeking to ensure there is a policy coherence, for example see Common Agricultural Policy reform or Doha Development Round. This approach might see the nature of aid change from loans, debt cancellation, budget support etc., to supporting developing countries. This requires a strong political will, however, the results could potentially make aid far more effective and efficient.

== History ==
An early example of the military type of aid is the First Crusade, which began when Byzantine Greek emperor Alexios I Komnenos asked for help in defending Byzantium, the Holy Land, and the Christians living there from the Seljuk takeover of the region. The call for aid was answered by Pope Urban II, when, at the Council of Piacenza of 1095, he called for Christendom to rally in military support of the Byzantines with references to the "Greek Empire and the need of aid for it."

After World War II the Marshall Plan (and similar programs for Asia, and the Point Four program for Latin America) became the major American aid program, and became a model for its foreign aid policies for decades. The U.S. gave away about $20 billion in Marshall Plan grants and other grants and low-interest long-term loans to Western Europe, 1945 to 1951. Economic historians Bradford De Long and Barry Eichengreen conclude it was, "History's Most Successful Structural Adjustment Program." They state:

It was not large enough to have significantly accelerated recovery by financing investment, aiding the reconstruction of damaged infrastructure, or easing commodity bottlenecks. We argue, however, that the Marshall Plan did play a major role in setting the stage for post-World War II Western Europe's rapid growth. The conditions attached to Marshall Plan aid pushed European political economy in a direction that left its post World War II "mixed economies" with more "market" and less "controls" in the mix.

For much of the period since World War II to the present "foreign aid was used for four main purposes: diplomatic [including military/security and political interests abroad], developmental, humanitarian relief and commercial."

=== Arab countries as "New Donors" ===
The mid-1970s saw some new emerging donors in the face of the world crises, discovery of oil, the impending Cold War. While in many literature they are popularly called the 'new donors', they are by no means new. In the sense, that the former USSR had been contributing to the popular Aswan Dam in Egypt as early as 1950s or India and other Asian countries were known for their assistance under the Colombo Plan Of these the Arab countries in particularly have been quite influential. Kuwait, Saudi Arabi and United Arab Emirates are the top donors in this sense. The aid from Arab countries are often less documented for the fact that they do not follow the standard aid definitions of the OECD and DAC countries. Many times, the aid from Arab countries are made by private funds owned by the families of the monarch. Many Arab recipient countries have also avoided of speaking on aid openly in order to digress from the idea of hierarchy of Eurocentrism and Wester-centrism, which are in some ways reminders of the colonial pasts. Hence, the classification of such transfers are tricky.

Over and on top of this, there has been extensive research that Arab aid is often allocated initially to Arab countries, and perhaps recently to some sub-Saharan African countries which have shown Afro-Arab unity. This is especially true considering the fact that aid by Arab donors is more geographically concentrated, given without conditionality and often to poorest nations in the Middle East and North Africa. This is perhaps potentially due to the existence of Arab Fund for Technical Assistance to African and Arab Countries (AFTAAAC) or the Arab Bank for Economic Development in Africa (BADEA). OECD data for example also shows Arab countries donate more to lower middle income countries, contrast to the DAC donors. It is not completely clear why such a bias must exists, but some studies have studied the sectoral donations.

Another big difference between the traditional DAC (Western) donors and the Arab donors is that Arab donors give aid unconditionally. Typically they have followed a rule of non-interference in the policy of the recipient. The Arab approach is limited to giving advice on policy matters when they discover clear failures. This kind of view is often repeated in many studies. These kind of approach has always been problematic for the relationship Arab countries have with institutions like IMF, World Bank etc., since Arab countries are members of these institutions and in some ways they oppose the conditionality guidelines for granting aid and conditions on repayment agreed internationally. More recently, UAE has been declaring its aid flows with the IMF and OECD. Data from this reveals that potential opacity in declaring aid may also result from the fact some Arab countries do not want to be seen openly as supporters of a cause or a proxy group in a neighboring country or region. The exact impact of such bilateral aid is difficult to discern.

Arab aid has often been used a tool for steering foreign policy. The 1990 Iraq invasion of Kuwait triggered an increase of Arab aid and large amounts went to countries which supported Kuwait. Many countries around this time still kept supporting Iraq, despite rallying against the war. This lead the Kuwait national assembly to decide to deny aid to supporters of Iraq. Saudi Arabia for example did a similar thing, In 1991, after the war, countries against Iraq –Egypt, Turkey and Morocco became the three major aid recipients of Saudi aid. Several similar stances have arisen in the recent years after the Arab Spring of 2011 particularly.

== Public attitudes ==
Academic research has suggested that members of the public overestimate how much their governments spend on aid. There is significant opposition to spending on aid but experiments have demonstrated that providing people with more information about correct levels of spending reduces this opposition.

== See also ==
- Aid agency
- Debt relief
- International Aid Transparency Initiative
- Transparency International
- White savior
- Effective altruism
