= Development aid =

Financial aid given to support the development of developing countries

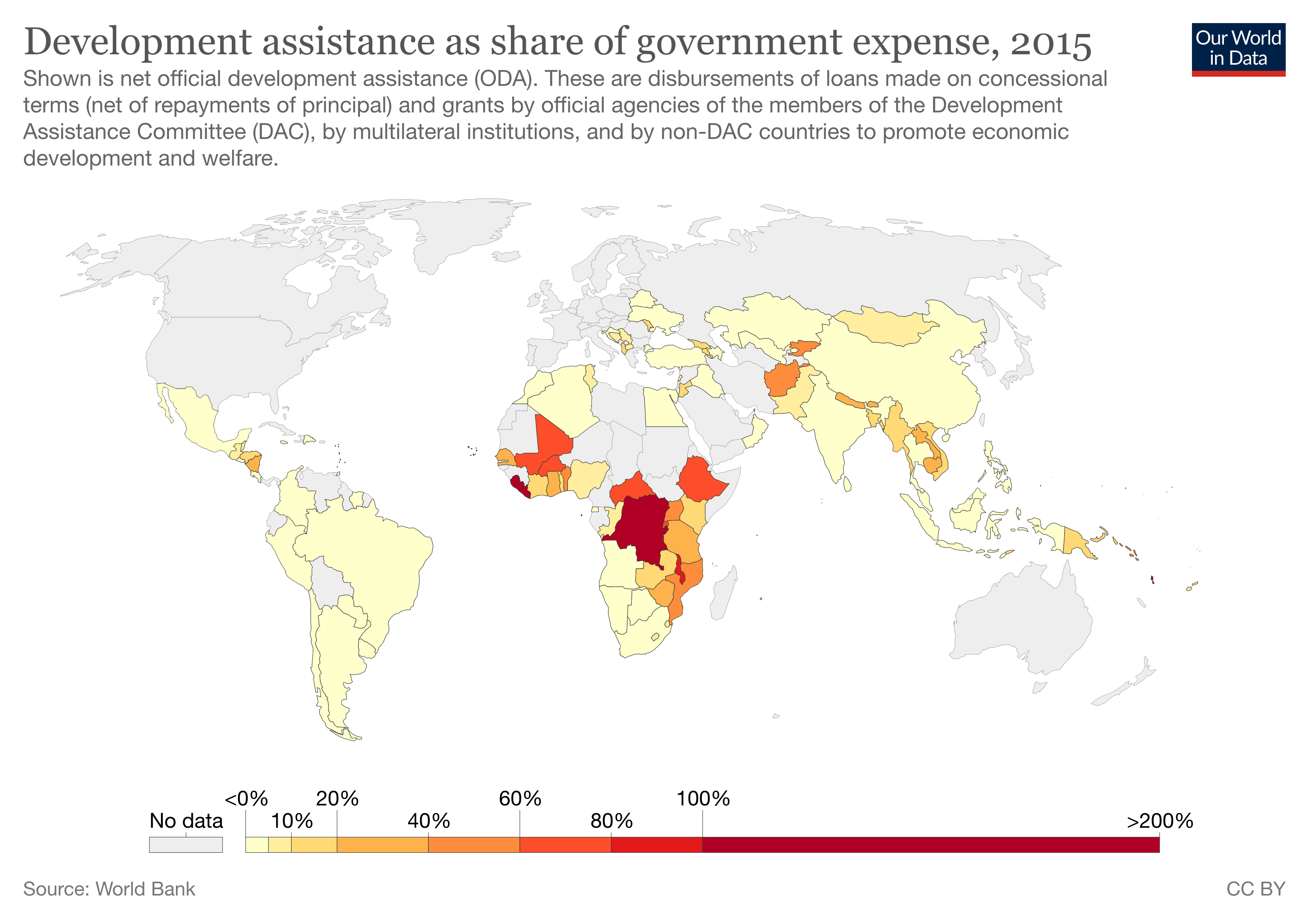
In some countries there is more development aid than government spending. (Image from World in Data)

Development aid (or development assistance) is a type of aid given by governments and other agencies to support the economic, environmental, social, and political development of developing countries, as well as least developed, low-income or poor countries. It is distinguished from humanitarian aid by aiming at a sustained improvement in the conditions in developing countries, as well as least-developed, poor of low-income countries, rather than short-term relief. The overarching term is foreign aid (or just aid). The amount of foreign aid is measured though official development assistance (ODA). This is a category used by the Development Assistance Committee (DAC) of the Organisation for Economic Co-operation and Development (OECD) to measure foreign aid.

Aid may be bilateral: given from one country directly to another; or it may be multilateral: given by the donor country to an international organisation such as the World Bank or the United Nations Agencies (UNDP, UNICEF, UNAIDS, etc.) which then distributes it among the developing countries. The proportion is currently about 70% bilateral 30% multilateral.

About 80% of the aid measured by the OECD comes from government sources as official development assistance (ODA). The remaining 20% or so comes from individuals, businesses, charitable foundations or NGOs (e.g., Oxfam). Most development aid comes from the Western industrialised countries but some poorer countries also contribute aid. Development aid is not usually understood as including remittances received from migrants working or living in diaspora—even though these form a significant amount of international transfer—as the recipients of remittances are usually individuals and families rather than formal projects and programmes.

Negative side effects of development aid can include an unbalanced appreciation of the recipient's currency, increasing corruption, and adverse political effects such as postponements of necessary economic and democratic reforms.

== Related concepts ==
There are various terms that used interchangeably with development aid in some contexts but possess different meanings in others.

- Development cooperation: In the early 21st century, development cooperation has become a key term in a discourse associated with the Global Partnership for Effective Development Cooperation. In this context it encompasses activities that may not be directly related to aid, such as domestic and global policy changes, co-ordination with profit-making and civil society entities, and exchanges between less-developed countries. Despite suggesting a wider range of co-ordinated action, the term is often used synonymously with development aid.
- Development assistance: is a synonym of development aid often used in international forums such as the UN and the OECD. Official development assistance (ODA) is aid given by OECD-member governments that specifically targets the economic development and welfare of countries with the lowest per capita incomes. It includes humanitarian aid as well as development aid in the strict sense.
- Aid: is a more general concept which can include humanitarian aid (emergency relief) and other voluntary transfers not specifically aimed at development. Other expressions that relate to aid in general include foreign aid, international aid, and overseas aid.

== Types ==
=== Bilateral and multilateral official development assistance ===
Analyses of development aid often focus on Official development assistance (ODA), as ODA is measured systematically and appears to cover most of what people regard as development aid. ODA may be bilateral: given from one country directly to another; or it may be multilateral: given by the donor country to pooled funds administered by an international organisation such as the World Bank or a UN Agency (UNDP, UNICEF, UNAIDS, etc.) which then uses its funds for work in developing countries. To qualify as multilateral, the funding must lose its identity as originating from a particular source. The proportion of multilateral aid in ODA was 28% in 2019.

=== Trilateral ===
Trilateral development cooperation (also called triangular development cooperation) is a type of development cooperation, wherein OECD DAC member states or multilateral institutions provide development assistance to emergent development actors, with the aim of assisting them in carrying out development projects in other developing countries.

The purpose of trilateral development cooperation is to combine the strengths of both OECD DAC member states and the new development actors in delivering more effective aid to recipient countries. The OECD DAC member states and multilateral institutions participate in trilateral development cooperation with the aimed goal of increasing aid effectiveness and efficiency, phasing out bilateral aid, transferring good practices, and capacity building.

Over 2019–2022, the Americas received one third of the global resources provided through triangular co-operation. The second largest recipient region was Africa, followed by Asia-Pacific. Multi-regional projects accounted from approximately one quarter of reported disbursements.

=== Non-ODA development aid ===
There are 4 categories of development aid that fall outside ODA, notably: private aid, remittances, aid to less-poor countries and aid from other donor states.

OECD distinguishes between development aid that is governmental ("official") on the one hand, and private (originating from individuals, businesses and the investments of charitable foundations, and channeled through religious organisations and other NGOs) on the other. Official aid may be government-to-government, or it may be channeled through intermediary bodies such as UN agencies, international financial institutions, NGOs or other contractors. NGOs thus commonly handle both official and private aid. Of aid reported to the OECD, about 80% is official and 20% private.

Development aid is not usually understood as including remittances received from migrants working or living in diaspora—even though these form a significant amount of international transfer—as the recipients of remittances are usually individuals and families rather than formal projects and programmes. World Bank estimates for remittance flows to "developing countries" in 2016 totalled $422 billion, which was far greater than total ODA. The exact nature and effects of remittance money remain contested. The International Monetary Fund has reported that private remittances may have a negative impact on economic growth, as they are often used for private consumption of individuals and families, not for economic development of the region or country.

ODA only includes aid to countries which are on the DAC List of ODA Recipients which includes most countries classified by the World Bank as of low and middle income.

Loans from one state to another may be counted as ODA only if their terms are substantially more favourable than market terms. The exact rules for this have varied from time to time. Less-concessional loans therefore would not be counted as ODA but might be considered as including an element of development aid.

Some states provide development aid without reporting to the OECD using standard definitions, categories and systems. Notable examples are China and India. For 2018, the OECD estimated that, while total ODA was about $150 billion, an additional six to seven billion dollars of ODA-like development aid was given by ten other states. (These amounts include aid that is humanitarian in character as well as purely developmental aid.)

Recognizing that ODA does not capture all the expenditures that promote development, the OECD in 2014 started establishing a wider statistical framework called TOSSD (Total Official Support for Sustainable Development) that would count spending on "international public goods". In March 2022, TOSSD was adopted as a data source for indicator 17.3.1 of the SDGs global indicator framework to measure development support. The TOSSD data for 2020 shows more than US$355 billion disbursed to support for sustainable development, from almost 100 provider countries and institutions. The Commitment to Development Index published annually by the Center for Global Development is another attempt to look at broader donor country policies toward the developing world. These types of activity could be formulated and understood as a kind of development aid although commonly they are not.

== Output-based aid (OBA) ==
Output-based aid (OBA) (or results-based aid) refers to development aid strategies that link the delivery of public services in developing countries to targeted performance-related subsidies. OBA subsidies are offered in transport construction, education, water and sanitation systems, and healthcare among other sectors where positive externalities exceed cost recovery exclusively from private markets. OBA is a form of results-based financing, with similar principles as performance-based contracting.

Interest in OBA and results-based financing in the international development sector is growing. In healthcare, OBA is often implemented by contracting providers in either the public or private sector, sometimes both, and issuing vouchers to people considered at higher risk of disease or in greater need of the health services. OBA (in the form of results-based contracts) is also used for rural water supply in Africa.

== Extent ==
Most development aid is counted as part of the official development assistance (ODA) reported by governments to the OECD. The total amount of ODA in 2018 was about $150 billion. For the same year, the OECD estimated that six to seven billion dollars of aid was given by ten other states, including China and India. However, these amounts include aid that is humanitarian in character as well as purely developmental aid. The proportion of development aid within ODA was about 80%.

The OECD classifies ODA development aid by sector, the main sectors being: education, health (including population policies, water supply and sanitation), government & civil society, economic infrastructure (including transport and energy), and production (including agriculture). Additionally, there are "cross-cutting" aims; for instance, environmental protection, gender equality, urban and rural development concerns.

Some governments include military assistance in the notion of foreign aid, although the international community does not usually regard military aid as development aid.

Development aid is widely seen as a major way to meet Sustainable Development Goal 1 (to end poverty in all its forms everywhere) for the developing nations.

=== Top recipient countries ===
ODA received, total for nine years, 2010-2018
Country	US$, billions
Afghanistan	37.6
India	18.1
Ethiopia	17.6
Vietnam	17.4
Pakistan	15.8
Democratic Republic of the Congo	15.6
Iraq	14.7
Tanzania	14.3
Kenya	13.9
Syria	13.3

=== Top donor countries ===
Total ODA disbursed in decade 2010-2019
Country	US$, billions
United States	323
Germany	188
United Kingdom	171
France	115
Japan	107
Sweden	56
Netherlands	56
Canada	47
Norway	46
Italy	42

The OECD also lists countries by the amount of ODA they give as a percentage of their gross national income. The top 10 DAC countries in 2020 were as follows. Six countries met the longstanding UN target for an ODA/GNI ratio of 0.7% in 2020:

1. Sweden – 1.14%
2. Norway – 1.11%
3. Luxembourg – 1.02%
4. Denmark and Germany – 0.73%
5. United Kingdom – 0.7%
6. Netherlands – 0.59%
7. France – 0.53%
8. Switzerland – 0.48%
9. Belgium and Finland – 0.47%
10. Canada, Ireland and Japan– 0.31%

European Union countries that are members of the Development Assistance Committee gave 0.42% of GNI (excluding the US$19.4 billion given by EU Institutions).

=== By type of project ===
Total official development assistance (ODA) and other official flows from all donors in support of infrastructure in 2017

Total official flows commitments for aid for trade in 2017

Total water and sanitation-related Official Development Assistance (ODA) disbursements that are included in the government budget in 2015

Total official development assistance (ODA) transferred for use in biodiversity conservation and protection efforts 2017

Total official development assistance for biodiversity, by donor in 2017

Total official flows commitments for Aid for Trade, by donor in 2015

== Aid to education ==
External financing plays a key role in supporting education in the poorest countries. Between 2023 and 2030, the annual SDG 4 financing gap for low- and lower-middle-income countries is estimated at USD 97 billion. If all 33 DAC countries had met the 0.7% ODA/GNI target and prioritised education, USD 29 billion more could have been mobilised each year. However, only Denmark, Luxembourg, Norway and Sweden met the target. Total ODA as a share of GNI has declined from 0.37% in 2022-23 to 0.26% in 2025, reaching its lowest level since 2004 and approaching the historical low of 0.21% recorded in 2001.

Amid declining public support, shifting political priorities, and scrutiny of aid effectiveness, development assistance is entering a period of uncertainty. Education may be particularly at risk as several donors reduce future ODA commitments. Since 2015, an increasing share of aid has been redirected to refugee costs and, since 2022, to Ukraine.

The decline in aid contrasts with global military spending, which reached USD 2.9 trillion in 2025. Just 1.5 days of military expenditure equalled the entire USD 12.2 billion spent on direct aid to education in 2024.

The global decline seen in overseas development aid is reflected in education financing. Between 2023 and 2024, aid to basic education fell at twice the rate (15%) of aid to education as a whole (8%).

The latest evidence indicates that aid to education is likely to fall by 30% by 2027, significantly faster than previously estimated.

The effects of declining aid are not evenly distributed. Low- and lower-middle-income countries that rely heavily on external financing for education are expected to have lost 20% of their education aid by 2026. One third of countries are projected to have lost a third of their past aid levels.

Many countries may face reduced capacity to maintain education programmes, strengthen systems, and expand access to quality learning opportunities. The decline is particularly concerning for basic education, where external support plays a critical role in reaching vulnerable populations.

== Favourable impacts ==
Research has shown that development aid has a strong and favorable effect on economic growth and development through promoting investments in infrastructure and human capital. According to a study conducted among 36 sub-saharan African countries in 2013, 27 out of these 36 countries have experienced strong and favorable effects of aid on GDP and investments. Another study showed that aid per capita supports economic growth for low income African countries such as Tanzania, Mozambique and Ethiopia, while aid per capita does not have a significant effect on the economic growth of middle income African countries such as Botswana and Morocco. Aid is most beneficial to low income countries because such countries use aid received for to provide education and healthcare for citizens, which eventually improves economic growth in the long run.

Some econometric studies suggest that development aid effectively reduces poverty in developing countries.

Other studies have supported the view that development aid has no clear average effect on the speed with which countries develop.

Dissident economists such as Peter Bauer and Milton Friedman argued in the 1960s that aid is ineffective: "an excellent method for transferring money from poor people in rich countries to rich people in poor countries."

In economics, there are two competing positions on aid. A view pro aid, supported by Jeffrey Sachs and the United Nations, which argues that foreign aid will give the big push to break the low-income poverty trap poorer countries are trapped in. From this perspective, aid serves to finance "the core inputs to development – teachers, health centers, roads, wells, medicine, to name a few". (United Nations 2004). And a view that is skeptic about the impacts of aid, supported by William Easterly, that points out that aid has not proven to work after 40 years of large investments in Africa.

== Unfavourable impacts ==
=== Imposition of inappropriate strategies and technologies ===
According to James Ferguson, these issues might be caused by deficient diagnostics of the development agencies. In his book The Anti-Politics Machine, Ferguson uses the example of the Thaba-Tseka project in Lesotho to illustrate how a bad diagnostic on the economic activity of the population and the desire to stay away from local politics, caused a livestock project to fail.

According to Martijn Nitzsche, another problem is the way on how development projects are sometimes constructed and how they are maintained by the local population. Often, projects are made with technology that is hard to understand and too difficult to repair, resulting in unavoidable failure over time. Also, in some cases the local population is not very interested in seeing the project to succeed and may revert to disassembling it to retain valuable source materials. Finally, villagers do not always maintain a project as they believe the original development workers or others in the surroundings will repair it when it fails (which is not always so).

=== Conditional aid ===
A common criticism in recent years is that rich countries have put so many conditions on aid that it has reduced aid effectiveness. In the example of tied aid, donor countries often require the recipient to purchase goods and services from the donor, even if these are cheaper elsewhere. According to a 1991 report for the OECD, tied aid can increase development aid project costs by up to 20 or 30 percent.

Other conditions include opening up the country to foreign investment, even if it might not be ready to do so.

=== Contradictions between aid and other donor policies ===
There is also criticism because donors may give with one hand, through large amounts of development aid, yet take away with the other, through strict trade or migration policies, or by getting a foothold for foreign corporations. The Commitment to Development Index measures the overall policies of donors and evaluates the quality of their development aid, instead of just comparing the quantity of official development assistance given.

At the development level, anthropologist and researcher Jason Hickel has challenged the narrative that the rich countries of the OECD help the poor countries develop their economies and eradicate poverty. Hickel states that the rich countries "aren't developing poor countries; poor countries are developing rich ones."

== Improving effectiveness ==
Aid effectiveness is the degree of success or failure of international aid (development aid or humanitarian aid). Concern with aid effectiveness might be at a high level of generality (whether aid on average fulfils the main functions that aid is supposed to have), or it might be more detailed (considering relative degrees of success between different types of aid in differing circumstances).

Questions of aid effectiveness have been highly contested by academics, commentators and practitioners, and there is a large literature on the subject. Econometric studies in the late 20th century often found the average effectiveness of aid to be minimal or even negative. Such studies have appeared on the whole to yield more affirmative results in the early 21st century, but the picture is complex and far from clear in many respects.

Many prescriptions have been made about how to improve aid effectiveness. In 2003–2011, around four high level forums on aid effectiveness were held to elaborate a set of good practices concerning aid administration co-ordination and relations between donors and recipient countries. The Paris Declaration and other results of these forums embodied a broad consensus on what needed to be done to produce better development results. From 2011 this movement was subsumed in one concerned more broadly with effective development co-operation, largely embodied by the Global Partnership for Effective Development Co-operation.

== For climate change ==
Proposals have been made to enhance climate-related development aid through a reformed Carbon Border Adjustment Mechanism—CBAM-Plus. This mechanism would redirect CBAM revenues to developing exporting countries to support their decarbonisation efforts, thereby strengthening climate mitigation in the Global South.

== For gender equality ==
Starting at the beginning of the UN Decade for Women in 1975, the women in development (WID) approach to international development began to inform the provision of development aid. Some academics criticized the WID approach for relying on integrating women into existing development aid paradigms instead of promulgating specific aid to encourage gender equality. The gender and development approach was created in response, to discuss international development in terms of societal gender roles and to challenge these gender roles within development policy. Women in Development predominated as the approach to gender in development aid through the 1980s. Starting in the early 1990s Gender and Development's influence encouraged gender mainstreaming within international development aid.

The World Conference on Women, 1995 promulgated gender mainstreaming on all policy levels for the United Nations. Gender Mainstreaming has been adopted by nearly all units of the UN with the UN Economic and Social Council adopting a definition which indicated an "ultimate goal ... to achieve gender equality". The UN included promoting gender equality and empowering women as one of eight Millennium Development Goals for developing countries.

The EU integrated women in development thinking into its aid policy starting with the Lomé Convention in 1984. In 1992 the EU's Latin American and Asian development policy first clearly said that development programs should not have detrimental effects on the position and role of women. Since then the EU has continued the policy of including gender equality within development aid and programs. Within the EU gender equality is increasingly introduced in programmatic ways. The bulk of the EU's aid for gender equality seeks to increase women's access to education, employment and reproductive health services. However, some areas of gender inequality are targeted according to region, such as land reform and counteracting the effects of gangs on women in Latin America.

USAID first established a women in development office in 1974 and in 1996 promulgated its Gender Plan of Action to further integrate gender equality into aid programs. In 2012 USAID released a Gender Equality and Female Empowerment Policy to guide its aid programs in making gender equality a central goal. USAID saw increased solicitations from aid programs which integrated gender equality from 1995 to 2010. As part of their increased aid provision, USAID developed PROMOTE to target gender inequality in Afghanistan with $216 million in aid coming directly from USAID and $200 million coming from other donors.

Many NGOs have also incorporated gender equality into their programs. Within the Netherlands, NGOs including Oxfam Netherlands Organization for Development Assistance, the Humanist Institute for Cooperation with Developing Countries, Interchurch Organization for Development Cooperation, and Catholic Organization for Relief and Development Aid have included certain targets for their aid programs with regards to gender equality. NGOs which receive aid dollars through the Norwegian Ministry of Foreign Affairs or which partner with the Norwegian government on aid projects must "demonstrate that they take women and gender equality seriously". In response to this requirement organizations like the Norwegian Christian charity Digni have initiated projects which target gender equality.

Private foundations provide the majority of their gender related aid to health programs and have relatively neglected other areas of gender inequality. Foundations, such as the Bill and Melinda Gates Foundation, have partnered with governmental aid organizations to provide funds for gender equality, but increasingly aid is provided through partnerships with local organizations and NGOS. Corporations also participate in providing gender equality aid through their Corporate Social Responsibility programs. Nike helped to create the Girl Effect to provide aid programs targeted towards adolescent girls. Using publicly available data Una Osili an economist at the Indiana University-Purdue University Indianapolis found that between 2000 and 2010 $1.15 billion in private aid grants over $1 million from the United States targeted gender equality.

The Organisation for Economic Co-operation and Development provides detailed analysis of the extent of aid for gender equality. OECD member countries tag their aid programs with gender markers when a program is designed to advanced gender equality. In 2019-20 OECD DAC members committed almost $56.5 billion to aid for gender equality, with $6.3 billion of that committed to programs where gender equality is a principal programmatic goal.

=== Effectiveness ===
Three main measures of gender inequality are used in calculating gender equality and testing programs for the purposes of development aid. In the 1995 Human Development Report the United Nations Development Program introduced the Gender Development Index and Gender Empowerment Measure. The Gender Empowerment Measure is calculated based on three measures, proportion of women in national parliaments, percentage of women in economic decision-making positions and female share of income. The Gender Development Index uses the Human Development Index and corrects its results in life expectancy, income, and education for gender imbalances. Due to criticisms of these two indexes the United Nations Development Program in its 2010 Human Development Report introduced the Gender Inequality Index. The Gender Inequality Index uses more metrics and attempts to show the losses from gender inequality.

Even with these indexes, Ranjula Swain of the Stockholm School of Economics and Supriya Garikipati of the University of Liverpool found that, compared to the effectiveness of health, economic, and education targeted aid, foreign aid for gender equality remains understudied. Swain and Garikipati found in an analysis of Gender Equality Aid that on a country and region-wide level gender equality aid was not significant in its effect. Swain and Garikipati blame this on the relative lack of aid with gender equality as a primary motivation.

In 2005, the Interagency Gender Working Group of the World Health Organization released the "So What? Report" on the effectiveness of gender mainstreaming in NGO reproductive health programs. The report found these programs effective, but had trouble finding clear gender outcomes because most programs did not measure this data. When gender outcomes were measured, the report found positive programmatic effects, but the report did not look at whether these results were from increased access to services or increasing gender equality.

Even when gender equality is identified as a goal of aid, other factors will often be the primary focus of the aid. In some instances the nature of aid's gender equality component can fail to be implemented at the level of individual projects when it is a secondary aspect of a project. Gender equality is often put forward as a policy goal for the organization but program staff have differing commitment and training with regards to this goal. When gender equality is a secondary aspect, development aid which has funds required to impact gender equality can be used to meet quotas of women receiving aid, without effecting the changes in gender roles that Gender Mainstreaming was meant to promote. Programs can also fail to provide lasting effects, with local organizations removing gender equality aspects of programs after international aid dollars are no longer funding them.

Robert C. Jones of McGill University and Liam Swiss of Memorial University argue that women leaders of governmental aid organizations and NGOs are more effective at Gender Mainstreaming than their male counterparts. They found in a literature review that NGOs headed by women were more likely to have Gender Mainstreaming programs and that women were often the heads of Gender Mainstreaming programs within organizations. By breaking down gender equality programs into two categories, gender mainstreamed programs and gender-focused programs which do not mainstream gender, Jones and Swiss found that female leaders of governmental aid organizations provided more financial support to gender mainstreamed programs and slightly more support to gender aware programs overall.

=== Criticism of aid for gender equality ===
Petra Debusscher of Ghent University has criticized EU aid agencies for following an "integrationist approach" to gender mainstreaming, where gender mainstreaming is used to achieve existing policy goals, as opposed to a "transformative approach" which seeks to change policy priorities and programs fundamentally to achieve gender equality. She finds that this approach more closely follows a Women in Development model than a Gender and Development one. Debussher criticized the EU's development policy in Latin America for focusing too much attention on gender inequality as a problem to be solved for women. She found that the language used represented more of a Woman in Development approach than a Gender and Development Approach. She notes that men's role in domestic violence is insufficiently brought forward, with program and policy instead targeting removing women from victimhood. Rather than discussing the role of men and women relative to each other, women are discussed as needing to "catch up with an implicit male norm". Debussher also criticized EU's development aid to Southern Africa as too narrow in its scope and too reliant on integrating women and gender into existing aid paradigms. Debusscher notes that women's organizations in the region are often concerned with different social constructions of gender, as opposed to the economic growth structure favored by the EU. For EU development aid to Europe and surrounding countries, Debsusscher argued that programs to encourage education of women were designed primarily to encourage overall economic growth, not to target familial and social inequalities.

Some criticism of gender equality development aid discusses a lack of voices of women's organizations in developing aid programs. Debusscher argued that feminist and women's organizations were not represented enough in EU aid. and that while feminist and women's organizations were represented in implementing policy programs they were not sufficiently involved in their development in EU aid to Southern Africa. Similarly, Jones and Swiss argue that more women need to be in leadership positions of aid organizations and that these organizations need to be "demasculinized" in order to better gender mainstream. T.K.S. Ravindran and A. Kelkar-Khambete criticized the Millennium Development Goals for insufficiently integrating gender into all development goals, instead creating its own development goal, as limiting the level of aid provided to promote gender equality.

== History ==
=== Britain for its colonies ===
The concept of development aid goes back to the colonial era at the turn of the twentieth century, in particular to the British policy of colonial development that emerged during that period. The traditional government policy had tended to favor laissez-faire style economics, with the free market for capital and goods dictating the economic role that colonies played in the British Empire.

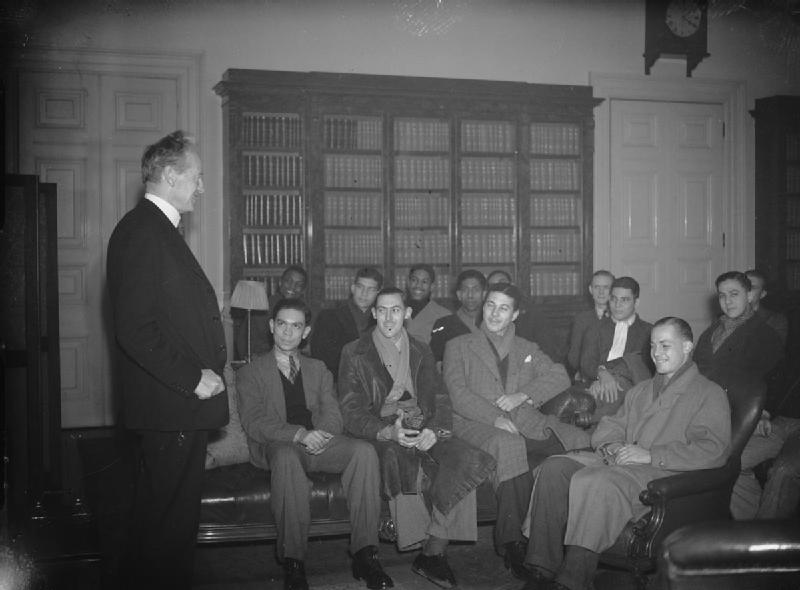
Lord Moyne, as Secretary of State for the Colonies presided over a Development Committee for the colonies. He is pictured entertaining Jamaican recruits for the RAF.

Changes in attitudes towards the moral purpose of the Empire, and the role that government could play in the promotion of welfare slowly led to a more proactive policy of economic and developmental assistance towards poor colonies. The first challenge to Britain was the economic crisis that occurred after World War I. Prior to the passage of the 1929 Colonial Development Act, the doctrine that governed Britain (and other European colonizers) with their territories was that of financial self-sufficiency. What this simply meant was that the colonies were responsible for themselves.

Britain was not going to use the money that belongs to the metropole to pay for things in the colonies. The colonies did not only have to pay for infrastructural development but they also were responsible for the salaries of British officials that worked in the colonies. The colonies generated the revenues to pay for these through different forms of taxations. The standard taxation was the import and export taxes. Goods going out of the colonies were taxed and those coming in were also taxed. These generated significant revenues. Apart from these taxes, the colonizers introduced two other forms of taxes: hut tax and labor tax. The hut tax is akin to a property tax today. Every grown up adult male had their own hut. Each of these had to pay a tax. Labor tax was the work that the people had to do without any remunerations or with meager stipends. As the economic crisis widened and had significant impact on the colonies, revenues generated from taxes continued to decline, having a significant impact on the colonies. While this was going on, Britain experienced major unemployment rates. The parliament began to discuss ways in which they could deal with Britain's unemployment rates and at the same time respond to some of the urgent needs of the colonies. This process culminated in the passage of the Colonial Development Act in 1929, which established a Colonial Development Advisory Committee under the authority of the Secretary of State for the Colonies, then Lord Passfield. Its initial annual budget of £1 million was spent on schemes designed to develop the infrastructure of transport, electrical power and water supply in colonies and dominions abroad for the furtherance of imperial trade. The 1929 Act, though meager in the resources it made available for development, was a significant Act because it opened the door for Britain to make future investments in the colonies. It was a major shift in colonial development. The doctrine of financial self-sufficiency was abandoned and Britain could now use metropolitan funds to develop the colonies.

By the late 1930s, especially after the British West Indian labour unrest of 1934–1939, it was clear that this initial scheme was far too limited in scope. A Royal Commission under Lord Moyne was sent to investigate the living conditions in the British West Indies and it published its Report in 1940 which exposed the horrendous living conditions there.

Amidst increasing criticism of Britain's colonial policies from abroad and at home, the commission was a performance to showcase Britain's "benevolent" attitude towards its colonial subjects. The commission's recommendations urged health and education initiatives along with increased sugar subsidies to stave off a complete and total economic meltdown. The Colonial Office, eager to prevent instability while the country was at war, began funneling large sums of cash into the region.

The Colonial Development and Welfare Act was passed in 1940 to organize and allocate a sum of £5 million per year to the British West Indies for the purpose of long-term development. Some £10 million in loans was cancelled in the same Act. The Colonial Development and Welfare Act of 1945 increased the level of aid to £120m over a twenty-year period. Further Acts followed in 1948, 1959 and 1963, dramatically increasing the scope of monetary assistance, favourable interest-free loans and development assistance programs.

=== Postwar expansion ===
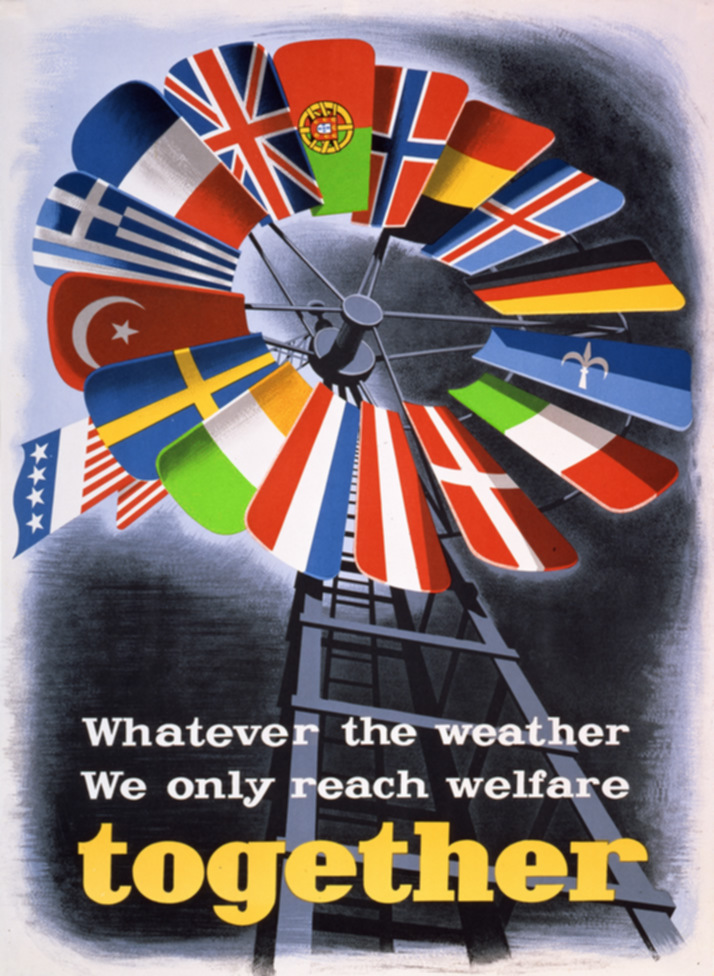
A poster promoting the Marshall Plan in Europe, the first large scale development program. It was designed to boost European economies shattered by war and prevent the growth of communist influence.

The beginning of modern development aid is rooted in the context of Post-World War II and the Cold War. Launched as a large-scale aid program by the United States in 1948, the European Recovery Program, or Marshall Plan, was concerned with strengthening the ties to the West European states to contain the influence of the USSR. Implemented by the Economic Cooperation Administration (ECA), the Marshall Plan also expanded its reconstruction finance to strategic parts of the Middle East and Asia.

Although Marshall aid was initially offered to Europe in general, the Soviet Union forbade its neighbouring states from accepting it. This has been described as "the moment of truth" in the post-World War II division of Europe. The Soviet Union provided aid to countries in the communist bloc; for instance, on Poland's abstention from the Marshall Plan, Stalin promised a $450 million credit and 200,000 tons of grain.

In January 1949 the inaugural address of U.S. president Harry Truman announced an extension of aid to "underdeveloped areas" in the form of technical assistance. While the main theme of the speech was strengthening the free world against communism, in his fourth point Truman also appealed to the motives of compassion and pride in civilization. "For the first time in history, humanity possesses the knowledge and skill to relieve the suffering of these people." The United Nations followed up the US initiative later that year by setting up an Extended Programme of Technical Assistance (EPTA) to help pool international donor funds for technical assistance and distribute them through UN agencies. EPTA was a precursor of UNDP.

U.S. aid for development in the 1950s came to include grants and concessional loans as well as technical assistance. This development aid was administered alongside military aid within the framework of the Mutual Security Act. But for most of the decade there was no major multilateral body to provide concessional loans. An initiative to create such a body under the UN met with resistance from the U.S. on the grounds that it was premature. Accordingly, when the UN's "Special Fund" was created at the end of 1958, its remit was only for technical assistance not loans. (The Special Fund was differentiated from EPTA by assisting public infrastructure rather than industrial projects.)

In 1959, a significant annual amendment to the Mutual Security Act declared that it was "a primary objective of the United States" to assist "the peoples of other lands who are striving to establish and develop politically independent and economically viable units". This shifted the emphasis of U.S. economic aid away from immediate Cold War security needs, towards supporting the process of dismantling the empires of the UK, France and other European colonial powers. The amendment also made clear that Congress expected those industrialized nations which had been helped by U.S. aid to rebuild after the war would now share more of the burden of helping less-developed countries.

Following on, the U.S. encouraged the Organisation for European Economic Cooperation (OEEC) to set up a Development Assistance Group (DAG) composed of the main donor states, in order to help coordinate their aid. This was done in January 1960. The following year the DAG adopted a "Resolution of the common aid effort", vowing to increase the volume of aid, and to share the task equitably. Shortly after this, the OEEC was succeeded by the OECD, expanding its scope from Europe to the world, and embracing a particular concern with less-developed countries. The DAG became the Development Assistance Committee (DAC).

1960 also saw the creation of a multilateral institution to provide soft loans for development finance. The International Development Association (IDA) was created as part of the World Bank (over which the U.S. and other Western countries exerted more influence than they did over the UN).

In 1961 several Western states established government departments or agencies to administer aid, including USAID in the United States.

In 1960 the USA was providing half of all aid counted by the OECD. This proportion increased to 56% by 1965, but from 1965 to 1973 (the year of the oil price crisis), the volume of U.S. aid generally declined in real terms (though it increased in nominal terms, due to inflation). The other OECD-DAC members meanwhile generally increased their aid, so that the total volume of OECD aid was fairly constant up to 1973.

=== After the Cold War ===
The quantity of ODA dropped sharply in the seven or eight years after the fall of the Berlin wall (1999–2007).

The turn of the 21st century saw a significant proliferation and diversification in aid donors and non-governmental actors. The traditional donors in the DAC have been joined by emerging economies (China, India, Saudi Arabia, Turkey, Brazil, Venezuela, etc.), some of which are still receiving aid from Western countries. Many of these new donors do not feel compelled to conform to traditional donors' norms. Generally demanding conditionality in return for assistance, which means tying aid to the procurement of goods and services, they are challenging traditional development aid standards.

Multinational corporations, philanthropists, international NGOs and civil society have matured into major players as well. Even though the rise of new development partners had the positive effect of bringing an increased variety of financing, know-how and skills to the development community, at the same time it has shaken up the existing aid system.

== See also ==
- Development economics
- International development
- List of development aid agencies

Tools and stories:

- Development Cooperation Handbook
