= Budget support =

Method of giving international development aid

Budget support is a particular way of giving international development aid, also known as an aid instrument or aid modality. With budget support, money is given directly to a recipient country government, usually from a donor government. Budget support differs from other types of aid modalities such as:

1. Balance of payments support, which is currently mainly the domain of the International Monetary Fund. With balance of payments support the funds go to the central bank for foreign exchange purposes, while with budget support they generally go to the Ministry of Finance (or equivalent) and into the budget for public spending.
2. Project aid, where development assistance funds are used by donors to implement a specific project, with donors retaining control of the project's financing and management.

In practice, budget support varies dramatically and is done in a large range of different ways. One of the broadest distinctions is between general budget support and sector budget support.

General budget support is unearmarked contributions to the government budget including funding to support the implementation of macroeconomic reforms (structural adjustment programmes, poverty reduction strategies).

Budget support is a method of financing a recipient country's budget through a transfer of resources from an external financing agency to the recipient government's national treasury. The funds thus transferred are managed in accordance with the recipient's budgetary procedures.

Funds transferred to the national treasury for financing programmes or projects managed according to different budgetary procedures from those of the recipient country, with the intention of earmarking the resources for specific uses, are therefore excluded.

Sector budget support, like general budget support, is an un earmarked financial contribution to a recipient government's budget. However, in sector budget support, the dialogue between donors and partner governments focuses on sector-specific concerns, rather than on overall policy and budget priorities.

== Rationale for budget support ==
The underlying rationale for budget support is variously seen as:

a) Researchers at the Overseas Development Institute (ODI) describe how highly fragmented, ad hoc, small projects were not delivering results and cumulatively may have been undermining aid agencies' own objectives. There is some evidence that the effect of ad hoc, small projects is not systematic, but there is a wide range of individual evaluations of project as well as some more meta-review data such as Wapenhans report (1992) and ‘Assessing Aid’ (1998). Thus the ODI highlights the following benefits:

- High transactions costs from the multiplicity of different reporting and accounting requirements, including tied aid;
- Inefficient spending dictated by donor priorities and procurement arrangements;
- Undermining of state systems through the special staffing arrangements and parallel structures;
- Corrosion of democratic accountability as mechanisms are designed to satisfy donor rather than domestic constituencies;
- Hard to sustain positive impact beyond the short term, with high level of reliance on donor funding which undermined sustainability;
- Corruption, fraud and rent-seeking were also a feature of the management of projects and not overcome by their independence from government control.

b) that building recipient government capacity and accountability to their own populations for service delivery, as the only sustainable way of reducing poverty in the long term. Evidence is scarce, since it is hard to tell what level and type of effect budget support is or even could have on these long term and highly political processes. The findings of the largest review to date are over all positive. For more information, see the 8-country evaluation of GBS (1994-2004), 4-page summary: http://www.oecd.org/dataoecd/16/63/37421292.pdf

In practice the other types of aid instruments are still running concomitantly which means the potential expressed in the underlying rationale is unlikely to be fully tested.

== Risks ==
The risks for donor governments and recipient governments are very different. The literature describes a range some of which are summarised below.

For the donor government the risks include:

1. Political risk of a recipient government doing something high profile and unpalatable
2. Fiduciary risk of putting resources into weak systems or supporting poor policies (but this is partly the point of budget support also). This type of risk includes that of corruption in the recipient government.
3. Loss of profile- donors tend to like to be able to report on specific outputs that they are responsible for, which is not possible with budget support

For the recipient government the risks include:

1. Much greater levels of intrusion by donors in your budget process
2. Reduced levels of flexibility about the allocation of resources, which with time may undermine the incentives for improving the efficiency of public spending
3. Increased volatility and unpredictability of aid flows
4. Increased vulnerability to ‘aid shocks’ if donors decided to withdraw funding
