= Qatari foreign aid =

Qatar’s international aid program has expanded dramatically since the beginning of 2010, and focuses heavily on the Arab world, most notably in the humanitarian crises in Syria and Gaza.

The Organization for Economic Co-operation and Development (OECD) estimates, based on Qatar´s Foreign Aid Report 2013, that USD 1.3 billion of Qatar's foreign aid can be considered as Official Development Assistance (ODA). According to the UN OCHA’s Financial Tracking Service, Qatar’s international aid increased from less than $10 million annually in the pre-Arab Spring period to the hundreds of millions following the event.

For example in 2012, according to the Qatari Ministry of Foreign Affairs, the country donated more than QAR3 billion (or c. £524 million) through both governmental and non-governmental aid to nearly 100 countries across the globe.

Qatari leadership has since pledged publicly to reduce the suffering of victims and to achieve and support global partnerships for the achievement of foreign countries’ Millennium Development Goals. The state is currently engaged in investments in a wide range of humanitarian and developmental sectors.

== Aims ==
According to the Qatari Ministry of Foreign Affairs, helping countries achieve internationally agreed development goals is the main objective of the program. Additionally, poverty reduction, including through employment creation in rebuilding and infrastructure projects, improved health and education as well as better management of the environment, are the main areas of focus of Qatar's international cooperation.

Qatar also promotes dialogue through soft power diplomacy initiatives in regional and international affairs, hoping to consolidate peace and stability, in addition to good relations with neighbouring countries and strategic alliances with major powers.

== Areas of focus ==
Qatar's foreign aid focuses principally on the Arab world. For example, in 2013, around 93 percent of Qatar's Official Development Assistance (ODA) went to countries in the region. Syria was the largest recipient, receiving $422 million, with much of this going towards humanitarian needs. Morocco, Palestine, Egypt, Yemen and Lebanon were among the other main recipients.

=== The Arab world ===
==== Syria ====
Since the Syrian revolution of 2011, Qatar's stance has been well known to the international political scene, making repeated calls for Syrian President Bashar al-Assad to step down and for new elections. Qatar has donated in excess of $1.6 billion to Syria in humanitarian aid for victims of the conflict in Syria, according to an article by Qatar's foreign minister in Britain’s Daily Telegraph in February 2015, despite allegations in 2013 that $650m pledged to the UN remained undelivered. In June 2023, Qatar pledged to donate $75 million for humanitarian needs to Syria. In August 2023, Qatar Charity rehabilitated the Bablit Water Station in northern Syria, enhancing water access and employment opportunities in the region.

==== Gaza (Palestine) ====
In the aftermath of the 2014 Israel–Gaza conflict, Qatar was the biggest aid donor with a pledge of $1 billion. Much of this funding went towards the construction of destroyed homes, as well as towards the repair and construction of two vital roads in the region, the Saladin and al-Rashid highways. In August 2019, Qatar increased the number of beneficiaries of aid in the Gaza strip from 60,000 up to 100,000 families. Each family received $100 in cash, the seventh such distributions in a year.

==== Lebanon ====
Qatar contributed $3mn in funding to the restoration of Lebanon following the 2006 Lebanon War, and financed the reconstruction of over 12,000 residential units and a number of buildings in 195 villages in southern Lebanon.

==== Egypt ====
Following the overthrow of Egypt’s President Hosni Mubarak in 2011, Qatar provided loans worth $4 billion and aid totalling $1 billion to help Egypt manage its political instability.

==== Yemen ====
Qatar has donated $500 million in humanitarian aid to two Yemeni provinces to help people displaced by the Houthi rebellion.

==== Turkey and Syria ====
Qatar government provided relief flights to Turkey to transport search and rescue teams as well as vehicles, a field hospital, tents, and other supplies. Qatar also distributed 27,000 hot meals in the Turkish city and also donated mobile homes from FIFA 2022 World Cup, further has pledged to send 10,000 mobile housing units to earthquake zones in Turkey and Syria. In April 2023, the Qatar Fund for Development (QFFD), in cooperation with the Turkish Presidency of Disaster and Emergency Management (AFAD), announced plans to build a city in northern Syria, which would house 70,000 displaced Syrians. On 24 June 2023, Qatar completed the delivery of 10,000 mobile homes.

==== Sudan ====
Qatar Charity provided relief aid to hospitals in Khartoum, including 28 tonnes of food and ready-made meals, and repatriated students of Taiba Education City safely. Qatar Charity has 12,516 sponsored persons in Sudan.

=== International Powers and Strategic Partners ===
==== United States ====
Following Hurricane Katrina in 2007, the former Emir of Qatar, Sheikh Hamad bin Khalifa Al-Thani donated $100 million to afflicted areas around New Orleans and beyond.

==== Japan ====
Qatar donated to Japan after the Tōhoku earthquake and tsunami in March 2011. In addition to providing natural gas shipments to the country, Qatar also hosted a high-profile football charity match in order to raise funds. This support was also formalized through the establishment of the Qatar Friendship Fund.

=== Major crises regardless of location ===
==== Nepal ====
In 2015, Qatar provided material and logistical assistance to Nepal following the earthquake. A total of QR12 million (c.£2.09 million) was also raised.

==== Philippines ====
Qatar provided significant relief to the Philippines following Typhoon Haiyan in 2013. The Qatar Red Crescent donated around $70,000 in immediate aid, while an appeal to raise a further $2 million was launched. Qatar's Ministry of Foreign affairs sent two planeloads of aid to affected areas.

==== Haiti ====
The Prime Minister of Qatar Sheikh Hamad bin Jassim bin Jaber Al Thani announced a $20 million donation in 2010 to Haiti following the earthquake.

== Non-governmental donations ==
A large share of Qatar's total international assistance comes from private non-governmental organisations (NGOs) and foundations. In 2013, slightly more than one-fifth of the total aid was made by these NGOs, the largest of which are:

- Qatar Charity
- Sheikh Eid bin Mohammad Al Thani Charitable Association
- Foundation Sheikh Thani Ibn Abdullah for Humanitarian Services (RAF)
- Reach Out To Asia
- Qatar Red Crescent

== See also ==
- Aid
- Foreign relations of Qatar
- Humanitarian aid during the Syrian Civil War
- Arab League peace plans for Syria
- Saudi foreign assistance
- Administration of federal assistance in the United States
