= Foreign aid to Francophone West Africa =

Overview of aid

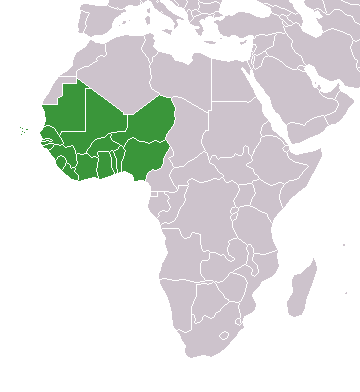
West Africa (UN subregion)

Foreign aid to Francophone West Africa refers to the monetary, technical and development assistance given by countries (through bilateral agreements), international organizations (multilateral agreements) and Non-Governmental Organizations (NGOs) to francophone countries in the region of West Africa. Since the independence from France in the sixties, aid has participated to the development of West African countries with grants, loans, technical support and humanitarian aid.

Historically, aid has been provided to transition from colonies to independent countries and help development. Yet, the assistance partnerships are often motivated by geopolitical and economic interests to foster relationships with the receiving countries for the donors. The francophone West Africa region has particularly relied on subsidized loans from the International Monetary Fund (IMF) and the World Bank. Those concessional loans have low interest rates and long repayment periods and have participated in the financing of infrastructure, health, education, and poverty reduction programs. Financing agreements usually come with requirements on the repayment but also on the use of the money loaned. The number of financing conventions a receiving country has can be very important. For instance, in 2020 alone, Burkina Faso signed 122 funding agreements, including 29 with bilateral partners, 32 with multilateral ones, and 61 with NGOs and this was an increasing number compared to 2019 by 2.8%.

The effectiveness of such aid is however regularly questioned. Critics contest the conditions that usually come with the agreements that limit the autonomy of recipient countries in their policy implementations. Aid is accused of fostering the dependency of countries on external financing and raises concerns about economic and governance independence in the long-run.

== Impact of aid on economic growth ==
The impact of foreign aid on economic growth is generally controversial. Empirical studies find mixed results. For example, Nwude et al found that in Francophone Sub-Sahara African Countries, bilateral aid contributes positively to economic growth in the long run. However, in the short run, bilateral aid does not have a significant impact. Multilateral aid does not have a significant impact on economic growth in the short or long run. However, Babalola and Shittu argue that aid does not have a positive or negative impact on the economy by itself but only through the impact of institutions. With efficient institutions and good governance, aid has a positive impact on economic growth but with weak institutions, the effect is negative. Weak governance, corruption, and political instability create conditions that hinder the effectiveness of aid, potentially reversing its intended benefits and exacerbating economic challenges in recipient countries. At the opposite, Ferreira and Simoes found strong negative significant impact of aid on growth in Sub-Saharan Africa.

== French aid to Francophone African countries ==
France has historically been the most significant donor to Francophone West Africa. French aid to the region has been deeply embedded in post-colonial economic structures, political alliances, and strategic interests. After decolonisation, French aid policy was heavily concentrated on Francophone Africa, with some two-thirds of French aid going to France's former colonies in sub-Saharan Africa.

During the Cold War, France provided extensive financial and military support to its former colonies to maintain geopolitical influence and counter Soviet or American intervention in Africa. This support included direct budgetary aid, technical assistance, and infrastructural investments.

The CFA franc, two currencies used by 14 African countries, remains a key mechanism of French economic influence. It was created when 12 of those countries were still colonies and after being pegged to the French Franc, is now bound to the Euro. While proponents argue that it ensures financial stability, critics view it as a tool of neocolonial control that restricts monetary sovereignty.

French aid is often delivered through institutions such as the "Agence Française de Développement" (AFD) and multilateral frameworks like the European Union's development programs. In recent years, France has emphasized aid for education, healthcare, climate resilience, and counter-terrorism efforts in the Sahel. By 2011, the multilateral component of French aid accounted for 33% of total ODA.

However, French aid policies have been criticized for perpetuating economic dependency and favoring French business interests. The concept of "Françafrique"—a term describing France's continued economic and political dominance in its former colonies—remains a contentious issue. Some argue that French-backed projects often prioritize the interests of French multinational corporations over local economic development.

Despite these challenges, France has periodically reformed its aid approach. In 2017, French President Emmanuel Macron announced initiatives aimed at reducing direct budgetary support and focusing on partnerships that promote local entrepreneurship and private sector investment.
