= High level forums on aid effectiveness =

Institution in international development

Four high level forums on aid effectiveness were held between 2003 and 2011 as part of a "continuous effort towards modernising, deepening and broadening development co-operation and the delivery of aid" coordinated through the OECD. They took place at Rome (2003), Paris (2005), Accra (2008) and Busan (2011). (The phrase "aid effectiveness" appeared in the titles of the latter three forums; the Rome forum was retrospectively seen by the OECD as having been the first of the series.)

The main theme of the forums was improvement in coordination of aid between donor and recipient states. Its most famous product was the 2005 Paris Declaration on Aid Effectiveness which set out five fundamental principles for making aid more effective, namely: ownership (by the recipient country), alignment (of donor aid with recipients' objectives and systems), harmonisation (of donor systems), managing for results, and mutual accountability. The Declaration established 12 targets (later expressed as 13 quantified targets) for the fulfilment of these principles by 2010. The official review in 2011/12 found that only one of the 13 targets had been met, although "considerable progress" had been seen in some of the other areas.

The fourth and final high level forum, at Busan in 2011, resolved to "broaden our focus and attention from aid effectiveness to the challenges of effective development". To this end, it mandated the creation of the Global Partnership for Effective Development Co-operation whose process superseded that of the high level forums on aid effectiveness.

== Background ==
The four high level forums on aid effectiveness (2003–2011) took up the challenge of a previous high-level conference that had been convened by the UN in 2002 at Monterrey, Mexico on the subject of financing for development. The Monterrey Consensus, arrived at by heads of state and government, urged (among other things) developed countries to increase the quantities of development aid, recognizing that this demanded enhanced aid effectiveness which would involve increased harmonization and use of "development frameworks that are owned and driven by developing countries".

The Monterrey Consensus had in turn referred back to previous events, in particular the United Nations Millennium Declaration (grounding the Millennium Development Goals whose eighth goal was "a global partnership for development"), and the September 11 terrorist attacks (which had occurred just six months earlier and were exacerbating a global economic slowdown, and also had implications for global security cooperation).

== Rome High Level Forum on Harmonisation, 2003 ==
Held on 24–25 February 2003, the Rome forum brought together the heads of governmental and inter-governmental aid agencies with leaders of aid recipient countries. It resulted in a "Rome Declaration" in which the parties pledged principally that aid should adopt the priorities and leadership of recipient country governments and result in greater ownership by them, and that the bureaucratic burdens imposed by donors on recipients (and vice versa) should be reduced.

== The Working Party on Aid Effectiveness ==
Following the Rome forum, the OECD's Development Assistance Committee (DAC) set up a Working Party on Aid Effectiveness. In its early stage, this sought to create a framework for monitoring the Rome commitments. It was at first made up mainly of DAC members, i.e. representatives of the traditional governmental donors. Later it was joined by non-traditional donors, aid recipient countries, civil society organisations and others in what the OECD hailed as "the international partnership for aid effectiveness". This Working Party became the lower-level forum overseeing preparations for the subsequent high level forums.

== Paris High Level Forum on Aid Effectiveness, 2005 ==
 Paris Declaration Targets & Achievements, 2005-2010 1. Operational development strategies % of countries having a national development strategy rated "A" or "B" on a five-point scale
Target: 75%
2005 baseline:19%
2010 outcome: 37%
2a. Reliable public financial management systems % of countries moving up at least one measure on the four-point scale since 2005
Target: 50%
2005 baseline: -
2010 outcome: 38%
3. Aid flows are aligned on national priorities % of aid for the government sector reported on the government's budget
Target: 85%
2005 baseline:44%
2010 outcome: 46%
4. Strengthen capacity by coordinated support % of technical cooperation implemented through coordinated programmes consistent with national development priorities
Target: 50%
2005 baseline: 49%
2010 outcome: 57%
5a. Use of country public financial management systems % of aid for the government sector using partner countries' PFM systems
Target: 55%
2005 baseline: 40%
2010 outcome: 48%
6. Strengthen capacity by avoiding parallel PIUs Total number of parallel project implementation units (PIUs)
(The smaller the better)
Target: 565
2005 baseline: 1696
2010 outcome: 1168
7. Aid is more predictable
% of aid for the government sector disbursed within the scheduled fiscal year
Target: 71%
2005 baseline: 41%
2010 outcome: 42%
8. Aid is untied
% of aid that is fully untied
Target: 89%
2005 baseline: 85%
2009 outcome: 86%
9. Use of common arrangements or procedures
% of aid provided in the context of programme-based approaches
Target: 66%
2005 baseline: 43%
2010 outcome: 48%
10a. Joint Missions
% of donor missions to the field undertaken jointly
Target: 40%
2005 baseline: 20%
2009 outcome: 22%
10b. Joint country analytic work
% of country analytic work undertaken jointly
Target: 66%
2005 baseline: 41%
2010 outcome: 44%
11. Results-oriented frameworks
% of countries with transparent and monitorable performance assessment frameworks
Target: 38%
2005 baseline: 7%
2009 outcome: 22%
12. Mutual accountability
% of countries with mutual assessment reviews in place
Target: 100%
2005 baseline: 44%
2010 outcome: 50%

In February 2005, the international community came together at the Paris High Level Forum on Aid Effectiveness, hosted by the French government and organised by the OECD. The role of aid in promoting development was attracting increasing public scrutiny in the run-up to the G8 Summit in Gleneagles, Scotland, and the global campaigns such as Make Poverty History.

While some progress had been made in harmonising the work of international aid donors in developing countries, it was acknowledged that much more needed to be done. The aid process was still too strongly led by donor priorities and administered through donor channels, making it hard for developing countries to take the lead. Aid was still too uncoordinated, unpredictable and un-transparent. Deeper reform was felt to be essential if aid was to demonstrate its true potential in the effort to overcome poverty.

At the Paris meeting, more than 100 signatories—from donor and developing-country governments, multilateral donor agencies, regional development banks and international agencies—endorsed the Paris Declaration on Aid Effectiveness. The Paris Declaration went much further than previous agreements; it represented a broader consensus among the international community about how to make aid more effective. At its heart was the commitment to help developing-country governments formulate and implement their own national development plans, according to their own national priorities, using, wherever possible, their own planning and implementation systems.

The Paris Declaration contains 56 partnership commitments aimed at improving the effectiveness of aid. It lays out 12 indicators to provide a measurable and evidence-based way to track progress, and sets targets for 11 of the indicators to be met by 2010. Some country-level aid information management systems, such as the Development Assistance Database, are tracking indicators based on the principles of the Paris Declaration for tracking aid effectiveness and measuring donor performance.

=== Principles of the Paris Declaration on aid effectiveness ===
The Declaration is focused on five mutually reinforcing principles:

1. Ownership: Developing countries must lead their own development policies and strategies, and manage their own development work on the ground. This is essential if aid is to contribute to truly sustainable development. Donors must support developing countries in building up their capacity to exercise this kind of leadership by strengthening local expertise, institutions and management systems. The target set by the Paris Declaration is for three-quarters of developing countries to have their own national development strategies by 2010.
2. Alignment: Donors must line up their aid firmly behind the priorities outlined in developing countries’ national development strategies. Wherever possible, they must use local institutions and procedures for managing aid in order to build sustainable structures. In Paris, donors committed to make more use of developing countries’ procedures for public financial management, accounting, auditing, procurement and monitoring. Where these systems are not strong enough to manage aid effectively, donors promised to help strengthen them. They also promised to improve the predictability of aid, to halve the amount of aid that is not disbursed in the year for which it is scheduled, and to continue to “untie” their aid from any obligation that it be spent on donor-country goods and services.
3. Harmonisation: Donors must coordinate their development work better amongst themselves to avoid duplication and high transaction costs for poor countries. In the Paris Declaration, they committed to coordinate better at the country level to ease the strain on recipient governments, for example by reducing the large numbers of duplicate field missions. They agreed on a target of providing two-thirds of all their aid via so-called “programme-based approaches” by 2010. This means aid is pooled in support of a particular strategy led by a recipient country—a national health plan for example—rather than fragmented into multiple individual projects.
4. Managing for results: All parties in the aid relationship must place more focus on the result of aid, the tangible difference it makes in poor people’s lives. They must develop better tools and systems to measure this impact. The target set by the Paris Declaration is for a one-third reduction by 2010 in the proportion of developing countries without solid performance assessment frameworks to measure the impact of aid.
5. Mutual accountability: Donors and developing countries must account more transparently to each other for their use of aid funds, and to their citizens and parliaments for the impact of their aid. The Paris Declaration says all countries must have procedures in place by 2010 to report back openly on their development results.

A first round of monitoring of the 12 Paris Declaration indicators was conducted in 2006 based on activities undertaken in 2005 in 34 countries. A second survey was organised in early 2008 in which 54 developing countries examined progress against the targets at country level. This 2008 Survey covers more than half all the official development assistance delivered in 2007—nearly USD$45 billion. The evidence so far suggests that progress has been made.

For example, more than one third of developing countries surveyed had improved their systems for managing public funds; almost 90% of donor countries had untied their aid; and technical cooperation is more in line with developing countries’ own development programmes. Despite these improvements, however, the results of the Survey show that the pace of progress remains too slow to reach the targets set in 2010. In particular, although many countries have made significant efforts to strengthen their national systems (for instance by improving how they manage their public funds), in many cases donors are still reluctant to use them.

The predictability of aid flows also remains low (with just over a third of aid disbursed on schedule), thereby making it hard—or impossible—for governments to plan ahead. In summary, whilst some progress has been made there are still many areas where the pace of change must be accelerated if the targets set for 2010 are to be reached. In addition to the data from the monitoring survey a useful way of understanding donor and recipient country performance is to examine donor and recipient country self-assessments, donor evaluations and Development Assistance Committee Peer Reviews.

In some quarters, the Paris Declaration is almost synonymous with aid effectiveness; it is expected that aid will be effective and achieve development outcomes when the principles are observed for government sector aid. However, there continue to be criticisms and alternative views, particularly from non-government aid organisations. Implementation of the Paris Declaration still needs to be significantly stepped up, according to the results of the 2008 Monitoring Survey. Concrete targets set for 2010 (such as an increased proportion of aid to be untied; establishment of "mutual accountability" mechanisms in aid recipient countries; and for two-thirds of aid to be delivered in the context of so-called programme approaches rather than projects) may be difficult to meet. Independent NGOs, such as Eurodad, also release their own evaluations, showing that the Declaration is not being implemented as planned. The Overseas Development Institute has specified that better monitoring of the relationship between the Paris Principles and development results at sector level is necessary.

== Third High Level Forum on Aid Effectiveness, Accra, September 2008 ==
The Third High Level Forum on Aid Effectiveness (HLF-3) was held in Accra, Ghana from September 2–4, 2008. Its aim was to build on the work of the two previous meetings, in Rome and Paris, to take stock of progress so far, and to accelerate the momentum of change. The Forum was attended by senior ministers from more than 100 countries, as well as representatives of multilateral aid institutions such as the European Commission (EuropeAid), the World Bank, the United Nations (UN), private foundations and civil society organisations. It was the first of three major international aid conferences in 2008, all aimed at speeding up progress toward the Millennium Development Goals. It was followed by the United Nations High Level Event on the MDGs in New York on 25 September and the Follow-up International Conference on Financing for Development in Doha, Qatar, 29 November-2 December.

The Accra Forum took place against a rapidly changing international aid landscape. Donor countries such as China and India are becoming increasingly important and there are more global programmes and funds that channel aid to tackle specific problems, such as the Global Fund to Fight AIDS, Tuberculosis and Malaria. Private funding sources such as the Bill and Melinda Gates Foundation are becoming major players, and civil society groups are increasingly active. The new players bring substantial new resources and expertise to the aid process, but increase the complexity developing countries face in managing aid. The HLF-3 aims to encourage the formation of broad aid partnerships, based on the principles of the Paris Declaration, that will encompass all players.

The Accra meeting was different from its predecessors in that developing countries played a more active role in the preparations and the agenda. Some 80 developing countries took part in the regional preparatory events. Fifty-four developing countries participated in the OECD’s 2008 Survey of progress against the Paris Declaration targets. Civil society is increasingly involved in discussions of aid effectiveness; globally, more than 300 civil society groups, including grass roots groups, were involved in consultations in the lead-up to the Accra meeting.

There is broad acknowledgement that new global challenges, such as rising food and fuel prices and climate change, bring added urgency to efforts to make aid as effective as possible. On the first two days of the HLF-3, there was a series of nine Roundtables covering the key issues in aid effectiveness, from country ownership to managing aid in situations of conflict and fragility. On the third day of the Forum, ministers endorsed the Accra Agenda for Action (AAA). This ministerial statement has been developed with support from a multi-national consensus group working under the auspices of the OECD’s Working Party on Aid Effectiveness.

Attention is being focused on stepping up progress toward the commitments outlined in the Paris Declaration by committing signatories to accelerating the pace of change by focusing on key areas that should enable them to meet the 2010 targets agreed in Paris. Drawing on evidence from the latest evaluations, the 2006 and 2008 Surveys on Monitoring the Paris Declaration and on in-depth contributions from developing countries, the AAA identifies three main areas where progress toward reform is still too slow.

1. Country ownership. The Accra Agenda for Action says developing-country governments still need to take stronger leadership of their own development policies and engage further with their parliaments and citizens in shaping them. Donors must commit to supporting them by respecting countries’ priorities, investing in their human resources and institutions, making greater use of their systems to deliver aid, and further increasing the predictability of aid flows.
2. Building more effective and inclusive partnerships. The Accra Agenda for Action aims to incorporate the contributions of all development players—middle-income countries, global funds, the private sector, civil society organisations—into more inclusive partnerships. The aim is for all the providers of aid to use the same principles and procedures, so that all their efforts are coherent and have greater impact on reducing poverty.
3. Achieving development results—and openly accounting for them. The Accra Agenda for Action says the demonstration of impact must be placed more squarely at the heart of efforts to make aid more effective. There is a strong focus on helping developing countries to produce stronger national statistical and information systems to help them better monitor and evaluate impact. More than ever, citizens and taxpayers of all countries expect to see the tangible results of development efforts. In the AAA, developing countries commit to making their revenues, expenditures, budgets, procurements and audits public. Donors commit to disclosing regular and timely information on their aid flows.

The Accra Agenda for Action sets out a list of commitments for its signatories, building on those already agreed in the Paris Declaration. It asks the OECD’s Working Party on Aid Effectiveness to continue monitoring progress on implementing the Paris Declaration and the Accra Agenda for Action and to report back to the Fourth High Level Forum on Aid Effectiveness in December 2011. Many donor and recipient governments will have to make serious changes if the AAA’s aims are to be fulfilled. The fact that ministers have signed up to these changes in Accra makes the AAA a political document—rather than a technocratic prescription—to move from business as usual to a new way of working together.

== Between Accra and Busan ==
Research by the Overseas Development Institute based on in-person interviews with senior politicians and government officials in Ethiopia, Sierra Leone and Zambia suggested that the Accra Agenda for Action (AAA) and Paris Declaration on Aid Effectiveness's indicators were too narrowly defined and lack depth. The principles of "predictability" and "transparency" were highlighted as lacking depth and important sub-dimensions not given enough emphasis, for instance on adaptation to local contexts. The interviews revealed recipient governments felt "predictability" meant donors should provide funding within the quarters scheduled: the Paris Declaration worked on an annual basis and made no distinction between the first and fourth quarter. Also mentioned were the differences between pledges and actual commitments, the need to speed up the approval process and the need to make explicit and achievable conditions on the aid, to prevent withholding of funds when minor conditions are not fully achieved. Transparency in the reasons for donors' decisions was also seen as very important, the need to be 'frank' about why less funding was disbursed than committed, why feedback from the recipient government was not taken on board, and why a given percentage of funds was earmarked for certain activities such as technical assistance (TA). The resulting conclusion from these interviews and other studies was that repeatedly, the three most important issues for donor recipients were:

- depth of commitment to development
- responsiveness to country circumstances, and
- support for recipient-driven policy

Those donor agencies highlighted by aid recipients as particularly attentive to these issues are the African Development Bank (AfDB) and the World Bank, followed by the United Nations Development Programme (UNDP) and the Asian Development Bank (AsDB).

== Fourth High Level Forum on Aid Effectiveness, Busan, South Korea, November 2011 ==
The Fourth High Level Forum on Aid Effectiveness was held in Busan, South Korea from 29 November 2011 to 1 December 2011. The forum brought together political leaders, government representatives, parliamentarians, civil society organisations and private sector representatives from both developing and donor countries. South Korea held a large stake in the forum. It was one of few countries that has transformed from a net aid recipient to a net aid donor. The holding of the forum in Busan allowed South Korea to share its own development experience, which had attracted a considerable amount of research in the country since 2008.

Despite the fact that the international community had addressed the effectiveness issue through the Paris Declaration and the subsequent Accra Agenda for Action, it was recognised that the implementation of this agenda had been difficult. There was broad consensus that aid could still be managed more effectively, answering a call for greater program quality and accountability.

At the forum there was much stress on the need for a broader and more inclusive partnership for development. The forum's final declaration expressed many mutual commitments along these lines including the establishment of the Global Partnership for Effective Development Co-operation. But this inclusivity was seen to involve a weakening of the Paris and Accra agreements in the sense that the commitments were to be implemented by diverse actors according to their respective situations, and thus became less absolute and binding. In particular, the effort to ensure that China joined the agreement was observed to involve a last-minute watering-down.

== Evaluation and critiques ==
The official review in 2011/12 found that, of the 13 monitored targets established by the Paris Declaration, only one had been met, though it observed that "considerable progress" had been seen in some of the other areas.

The principles agreed upon in the declarations are, however, not always practiced by donors and multilateral bodies. In the case of Cambodia, two experts have assessed donor misbehaviour.
