= Global Partnership for Effective Development Co-operation =

Institution in international development

The Global Partnership for Effective Development Co-operation (GPEDC), formed in 2012, is an association of governments and organisations that seeks to improve practices of international development. It has a unique position due to the breadth and stature of its participants (in 2021 about 161 countries and 56 major organisations concerned with development).

The creation of GPEDC was mandated by the 2011 Busan High Level Forum on Aid Effectiveness, the fourth and last in a series of such forums held between 2003 and 2011. The purpose was to carry forward an "effective development co-operation" agenda, superseding the previous "aid effectiveness" movement. After the creation of the international Sustainable Development Goals in 2015, GPEDC aligned its mandate to the 2030 Agenda for Sustainable Development. GPEDC's monitoring exercises in 2016 and 2018 showed mixed success in advancing its endorsed practices of effective development co-operation. A notable disappointment has been lack of full participation by China and India.

== Organisation ==
=== Participants ===
GPEDC does not have a formal membership system but says (as of 2021) it "brings together 161 countries and 56 organizations".

=== Governance ===
GPEDC's key governance institutions are: a Steering Committee which meets twice a year; a Joint Support Group, hosted jointly by OECD and UNDP, which carries on GPEDC work between meetings of the Steering Committee; four Co-Chairs who chair the Steering Committee and provide guidance the JSG; and periodic High-Level Meetings where representatives of all primary stakeholders can take part.

=== Funding ===
Funding for the administration of GPEDC has been provided by at least 20 governments.

=== Vision ===
The stated vision of GPEDC is: "to maximise the effectiveness of all forms of co-operation for development for the shared benefits of people, planet, prosperity and peace".

=== Principles ===
GPEDC espouses four principles for development co-operation:

- country ownership over the development process,
- a focus on results,
- inclusive development partnerships
- transparency and accountability.

== History ==
=== Beginnings ===
The creation of GPEDC was mandated by the 2011 Busan High Level Forum (HLF) on Aid Effectiveness. This meeting was the fourth and last in a series of high-level aid effectiveness forums held between 2003 and 2011, which had mainly focused on the aid relationship between the government donors of developed countries and the governments of recipient countries, with close involvement also from the large multilateral aid agencies (European Union institutions, United Nations agencies, development banks etc.). The Busan forum saw a need to embrace a wider and more complicated set of actors and relationships in international development processes. The forum's final declaration – "Busan Partnership for Effective Development Co-operation" – may be regarded as GPEDC's founding document. It particularly recognised the importance of relationships between developing countries (South-South co-operation) and welcomed a broader range of non-governmental actors: "private sector" or profit-making bodies as well as more purely socially- and environmentally-purposed ("civil society") organisations. It sketched a road-map wherein the existing OECD Working Party on Aid Effectiveness (WP-EFF) would hand over to a GPEDC directorate in 2012, with a support team provided jointly by the OECD and UNDP.

The WF-EFF formally finished its work at the end of June 2012, reaching more detailed agreement on the mandate and working arrangements for GPEDC, as well as the indicators, targets and monitoring frameworks it was initially to use. It put in place a process to select a GPEDC Steering Committee including three co-chairs. The co-chairs that emerged were Justine Greening, Armida Alisjahbana, and Ngozi Okonjo-Iweala: government ministers of, respectively, the UK, Indonesia and Nigeria. The co-chairs met in October, and the first full meeting of the Steering Committee took place in December of that year. The Steering Committee supervised continuation of the work of crystallizing and monitoring the progress indicators, and prepared for GPEDC's first high-level meeting.

=== First High Level Meeting, Mexico, 2014 ===
GPEDC's first high-level meeting was held in Mexico in April 2014. The meeting was well-attended and lively, largely dispelling prior fears that GPEDC was in danger of fading away. The wide range of participants gave some credibility to GPEDC's ambition to be a more inclusive global partnership than its precursor, but the absence of official representation by China, and tepid or ambivalent participation by India, South Africa and Brazil, weakened attempts to focus on the roles of middle-income countries (MICs) and South-South co-operation. Some felt the process and agenda was still too much dominated by the OECD and its rich-world member states. Despite UNDP's role in the organisation and a visible presence of United Nations institutions at the meeting, there were worries that GPEDC was detracting from - or insufficiently integrated with - the UN's Development Co-operation Forum, and the UN-led process of developing the Post-2015 Development Agenda.

Little was changed from the range of concerns already established and discussed at Busan in 2011, yet the framework for monitoring progress on the commitments of the Aid Effectiveness agenda had been weakened, and the new results and accountability framework of GPEDC was also weak.

=== Progress indicators and results, 2010-2015 ===
Having been created to pursue the commitments of the 2011 Busan forum, GPEDC attempted to distill these commitments into a set of indicators and targets for monitoring and assessing progress. The first monitoring cycle was projected to run from 2010 to 2015, following on from the monitoring of the Paris Declaration on Aid Effectiveness, which had taken place from 2005 to 2010. However, for GPEDC it was more difficult to devise a limited number of suitable indicators because its participants were more numerous, various and changeable. The process of devising, testing and agreeing the details of the indicators took years. Although an initial draft was agreed in June 2012, the indicators were still not definitively finalized by 2016 when it was time to report on the cycle. Accordingly, some baselines were late or missing, and some targets were inapplicable or largely irrelevant. The following table summarises the results reported by GPEDC in 2016.

GPEDC indicators and results, 2010-2015
Principle	Indicator	Results as of 2015
Focus on development results	1b. Countries have results frameworks in place	80 out of 81 (99% of) participating recipient governments had "one or more strategic documents that met the requirements". 60 of them (74%) had a "single strategic document" for "priorities, targets and indicators". The report claims "very good progress" and “accelerating the pace of change” from 2010 although it did not state baseline or target values. (pp. 44–45)
Focus on development results	1a. Development partners are using existing country-led results frameworks in planning and designing new interventions	The proportions of interventions by DPs that used recipient government objectives, indicators, data, and joint final evaluations for 2015 were reported as respectively 85%, 62%, 52% and 48%. No previous baselines had been established for these measures. (pp. 47–50)
Country ownership of development co-operation	9a. Country systems are strengthened	Using the World Bank's Quality of Budgetary and Financial Management scale, and counting 57 countries assessed in both 2010 and 2015, 11 improved their grade (18%, far short of the 50% target) and at the same time 14 countries dropped in grade. (pp. 21, 60–62)
Country ownership of development co-operation	9b. Development partners use countries’ own public financial management and procurement systems	Among 81 recipient countries in 2015, the use of their systems by development partners stood at 50%. For countries reporting in both 2010 and 2015, the proportion was 51% in 2015, up from 45% in 2010.(pp. 66–67)
Country ownership of development co-operation	10. Aid is untied	For 81 recipient countries in 2015, the proportion of untied aid reportedly stood at 78%. For the subset of countries participating in both 2010 and 2015, the figure was 79%, up from 74% in 2010 so apparently fulfilling the target of "continued progress over time". The report however noted that effective rates of untied aid were likely lower than the reported rates. (pp. 21, 69–72)
Country ownership of development co-operation	5a. Annual predictability of development co-operation	Among 81 recipient countries in 2015, 83% of funds scheduled one year ahead were received in that year. For countries reporting in both 2010 and 2015, the proportion was 84% in 2015, down from 85% in 2010, and short of the 90% target (pp. 21, 72–75)
Country ownership of development co-operation	5b. Medium-term predictability of development co-operation	Among 81 recipient countries in 2015, 71% of funds scheduled one to three years ahead were received in that year. For countries reporting in both 2010 and 2015, the proportion was 74% in 2015, up from 71% in 2010, but still short of the 85% target (pp. 21, 75–77)
Inclusive partnerships for effective development	2. Civil society operates within an environment that maximises its engagement in and contribution to development	No earlier baseline was established, but for the 59 developing countries reporting in 2015, the percentages reaching acceptable levels on components of this indicator were: (pp. 22, 86–89): Legal and regulatory environment: 20%; CSOs apply the principles of accountability and transparency: 27%; Official development co-operation with CSOs: 41%; Space for multi-stakeholder dialogue on national development policies: 51%
Inclusive partnerships for effective development	3. Public-private dialogue promotes private sector engagement and its contribution to development	No earlier baseline was established, but for the 55 developing countries reporting in 2015, the ratings on components of this indicator were: (pp. 22, 89–90): Availability of instruments to facilitate dialogue: 5.2; Existence of potential champions: 6.6; Government willingness to engage: 6.8; Private sector willingness to engage: 7.5
Transparency and accountability for effective development	4. Transparent information on development co-operation is publicly available	The originally-envisaged "common standard" for monitoring proved unfeasible. But of 61 assessed aid providers, the following proportions were rated "excellent" or "good" in each of three systems, as follows: (pp. 101–105): OECD-DAC Creditor Reporting System: 73% in 2014 (up from 56% in 2012); OECD-DAC Forward Spending Survey: 66% in 2015 (up from 59% in 2013); International Aid Transparency Initiative: 35% in 2016 (no baseline given)
Transparency and accountability for effective development	6. Development co-operation is on budget and subjected to parliamentary scrutiny	Among the 60 countries that participated in both 2011 and 2016, 67% fulfilled the criteria in 2016, up from 54% in 2011 but short of the 85% target. (pp. 24, 107)
Transparency and accountability for effective development	8. Governments have systems in place to track allocations for gender equality and women's empowerment	47% of 81 countries were adjudged to have met the Busan commitment (having some elements of a system to track public allocations for gender equality and women's empowerment and also make the information public). Of the countries assessed in both 2013 and 2015, the proportion was 48% in 2015, up from 29% in 2013 but still far short of the 100% target. (pp. 24, 112–114)
Transparency and accountability for effective development	7. Mutual accountability is strengthened through inclusive reviews	46% of 81 countries passed at least four out of five conditions for mutual accountability. Of the countries assessed in both 2013 and 2015, the proportion was 55% in 2015, down from 57% in 2013 and far short of the 100% target. (pp. 24, 115-116 )

=== Second High-Level Meeting, Nairobi 2016 ===
At the second High-Level Meeting, at Nairobi in 2016, the participants formally affirmed and clarified GPECD's relevance under the 2030 Agenda for Sustainable Development (the Sustainable Development Goals having replaced the Millennium Development Goals the previous year). GPEDC reframed its mandate in terms of contributing to the 2030 Agenda, and pledged to report to the UN High-Level Political Forum on Sustainable Development (HLPF) on its contributions in this regard, especially regarding the monitoring of SDG Goal 17 Indicator 16.

The outcome document also affirmed the importance of GPEDC's monitoring framework, acknowledged a need to "refine" it, and annexed a summary of the 2016 findings, but was later criticised for not sufficiently upholding the principle of adhering to clear and time-bound commitments.

The meeting was attended by over four thousand people from more than 150 countries, but very few government ministers. The BRICS countries were even more sparsely represented than in the 2014 Mexico meeting. Signs were visible in the outcome document that GPEDC had given up trying to accommodate these countries with a separate role – involving clear differentiated commitments – for Southern providers of development cooperation.

=== Later history ===
A further monitoring round took place in 2018, incorporating the same indicators as previously, though without reference to the 2015 targets. It showed a mixed picture of improvements and regressions. Regarding the new monitoring of SDG Indicator 17.16, it found that 45% countries "reported progress towards inclusive, transparent and accountable multi-stakeholder partnerships". The 2018 monitoring round revealed significant progress among participants in strengthening national development planning, and that overall mutual accountability mechanisms in developing countries are becoming more inclusive. However, the monitoring results highlighted a decline in donor countries’ alignment to developing countries’ priorities and results frameworks; moreover, the forward visibility of development cooperation was decreasing. Civil society organisations were also found to be experiencing a deterioration in the conditions and overall environment for them to operate and contribute to development. The report suggested that improving the quality of public-private dialogue in developing countries required increased capacity, strengthened relevance and the inclusion of a wide range of private sector actors.

A "Senior Level Meeting" of GPEDC was held in the margins of an HLPF meeting in New York, July 2019. It celebrated GPEDC's creation of a Knowledge Sharing Platform and compendium of good practices, and also the establishment of a Business Leaders' Caucus and a set of "Principles for Effective Private Sector Engagement" (the "Kampala Principles"). The co-chairs acknowledged the "mixed picture" of the monitoring results and "lack of progress in the 'unfinished business' agenda" (i.e. meeting the commitments made by the 2005 Paris Declaration and subsequent high-level meetings). They encouraged proposals for reviewing GPEDC's monitoring function, and creating a Global Action Plan in time for the Third High Level Meeting.

In May 2020, the Steering Committee launched a Work Plan for 2020-2022 (the period leading up to the envisaged Third High Level Meeting of GPEDC, and the mid-point review of the 2015-2030 Sustainable Development effort). The Work Plan has three main priorities: to demonstrate that the effectiveness principles really produce an impact; to deepen the practice of "partnerships"; and to reform GPEDC's monitoring processes. The last of these means that GPEDC monitoring is suspended for 2020-2022 while a new framework is developed with a view to adoption at the 2022 High Level Meeting.
