= Afghanistan–United States relations =

Bilateral relations

- Afghanistan: United States

Diplomatic mission
- none: Afghan Affairs Unit, U.S. Embassy Doha

Envoy
- none: Chargé d'affaires Don Brown

Relations between Afghanistan and the United States began in 1921 under the leaderships of King Amanullah Khan and President Warren G. Harding, respectively. The first contact between the two nations occurred further back in the 1830s when the first recorded person from the United States explored Afghanistan. The United States government foreign aid program provided about $500 million in aid for economic development; the aid ended before the 1978 Saur Revolution. The Soviet invasion of Afghanistan in 1979 was a turning point in the Cold War, when the United States started to financially support the Afghan resistance. The country, under both the Carter and Reagan administrations committed $3 billion in financial and diplomatic support and along with Pakistan also rendering critical support to the anti-Soviet Mujahideen forces. Beginning in 1980, the United States began admitting thousands of Afghan refugees for resettlement, and provided money and weapons to the Mujahideen through Pakistan's Inter-Services Intelligence (ISI). The USSR withdrew its troops in 1989.

After the 9/11 attacks in 2001, the United States invaded Afghanistan and overthrew the new Taliban government to capture Osama bin Laden, although he was fled and was later found in neighboring Pakistan. This invasion led to the reconstruction of Afghanistan and the reestablishment of its diplomatic relations with the rest of the world. In 2012, U.S. President Barack Obama declared Afghanistan a major non-NATO ally; however, Joe Biden revoked its designation in 2022 after the Taliban took control of Kabul. American involvement in the War in Afghanistan, the longest war in U.S. history, ended after the withdrawal of American troops from the country by August 30, 2021. Concurrent with the U.S. withdrawal, the Taliban launched a major offensive in summer 2021 and overthrew the U.S.-backed Islamic Republic of Afghanistan, forcing the evacuation of U.S. diplomatic personnel from Afghanistan. The Bureau of South and Central Asian Affairs handles American foreign policy on Afghanistan.

Since the Taliban takeover of Afghanistan in 2021, the Taliban has repeatedly called upon the United States to reopen their embassy in Kabul and establish relations with the government of the Islamic Emirate of Afghanistan. However, the United States continues to reject any bilateral ties with the Taliban unless they improve their human rights track record.

== History ==
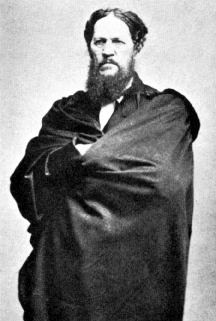
Josiah Harlan, also known as the Prince of Ghor, was an American adventurer and a political activist; he is shown in this pre-1871 photograph wearing an Afghan robe.

The first recorded contact between Afghanistan and the United States occurred in the 1830s when Josiah Harlan, an American adventurer and political activist from Philadelphia, traveled to South Asia with intentions of becoming the King of Afghanistan. It was when the East India Company (EIC) invaded Afghanistan during the First Anglo-Afghan War (1838–1842) when Afghan kings Shuja Shah Durrani and Dost Mohammad Khan were fighting for the throne of the Durrani Empire. Harlan became involved in Afghan politics and factional military actions, eventually winning the title Prince of Ghor in exchange for military aid. The British-Indian presidency armies of the EIC were defeated and forced to make a complete withdrawal a few years later, with around 16,500 of them being reported to be killed and captured in 1842. There is no clear evidence as to what happened because the claim is made by William Brydon, the lone survivor. Harlan left Afghanistan around the same period, eventually returning to the United States.

In 1911, A.C. Jewett arrived in Afghanistan to build a hydroelectric plant near Kabul. He became the Chief Engineer for King Habibullah Khan. Formerly an employee of General Electric (GE), he became the second American known to live and work in Afghanistan.

=== Official diplomatic relations ===
In January 1921, after the Treaty of Rawalpindi was signed between Afghanistan and British India, the Afghan mission visited the United States to establish diplomatic relations. Upon their return to Kabul, the envoys brought a greeting letter from U.S. President Warren G. Harding. After the establishment of diplomatic relations, the U.S. policy of helping developing nations raise their standard of living was an important factor in maintaining and improving U.S. ties with Afghanistan. Residing in Tehran, William Harrison Hornibrook served as a non-resident U.S. Envoy (Minister Plenipotentiary) to Afghanistan from 1935 to 1936. Louis G. Dreyfus served from 1940 to 1942, at which point the Kabul Legation was opened in June 1942. Colonel Gordon B. Enders of the United States Army was appointed the first military attaché to Kabul and Cornelius Van Hemert Engert represented the U.S. Legation from 1942 to 1945 followed by Ely Eliot Palmer from 1945 to 1948. Although Afghanistan had close relations with Nazi Germany, it remained neutral and was not a participant in World War II.

=== Cold War ===
Afghan-American relations became important during the start of the Cold War, between the United States and Soviet Union. Prince Mohammed Naim, King Zahir Shah's cousin, became the Chargé d'affaires in Washington, D.C. At that time, U.S. President Harry S. Truman commented that the friendship between the two countries would be "preserved and strengthened" by the presence of senior diplomats in each capital. The first official Afghanistan Ambassador to the United States was Habibullah Khan Tarzi, who served until 1953. The U.S. Kabul Legation was elevated to the U.S. Embassy Kabul on May 6, 1948. Louis Goethe Dreyfus, who previously served as Minister Plenipotentiary, became the U.S. Ambassador to Afghanistan from 1949 to 1951.

In the years immediately after World War II, the United States had replaced the United Kingdom as the "paramount" power in Afghanistan's affairs. A 1950 journal by Arnold Fletcher from the University of Southern California noted the state of this country to the United States and described it as:

Few Americans realize Afghanistan's potential political importance; to most Westerners, it is a faraway land, noted for nomads, dogs and rifle-packing tribesmen. Actually, it is a solid Central Asian state the size of Texas, with a virile population of 12 million, and a long history of ardent nationalism. For three thousand years it has been Asia's highway [...]

However, Fletcher also noted the difficulties of forming relations, amid tense Afghan-Pakistani border skirmishes:

Handicapped by a lack of area specialists, deficient intelligence service, and chronic Afghan suspicion nurtured by a century of being a buffer state, American diplomats have faced a series of problems. Most serious and immediate is the continuing quarrel between Afghanistan and Pakistan, a grave threat to the peace of Asia.

The first American expedition to Afghanistan was led by Louis Dupree, Walter Fairservis, and Henry Hart. In 1953, Richard Nixon who was serving as U.S. Vice President at the time, made an official diplomatic visit to Kabul. He also took a short tour around the city and met with local Afghans.

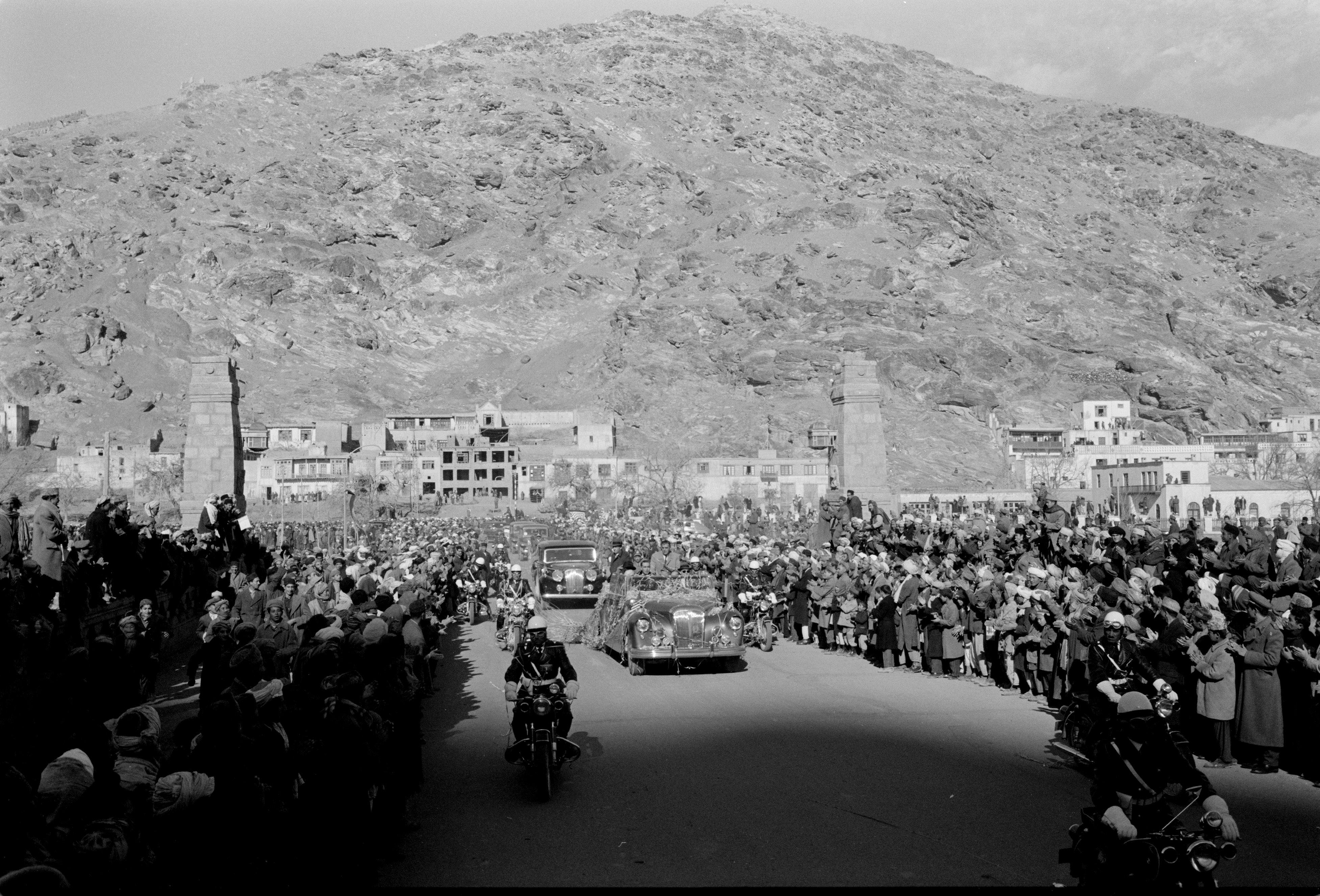
U.S. President Dwight D. Eisenhower's state visit to Afghanistan on December 9, 1959.

In 1958, Prime Minister Daoud Khan became the first Afghan to speak before the United States Congress in Washington, D.C. His presentation focused on a number of issues, but most importantly, underscored the importance of U.S.-Afghan relations. While in the U.S. capital, Daoud met with President Eisenhower, signed an important cultural exchange agreement, and reaffirmed personal relations with then Vice President Richard Nixon that had begun during the latter's trip to Kabul in 1953. The Prime Minister also traveled around the United States visiting the New York Stock Exchange, the Empire State Building, hydroelectric facilities at the Tennessee Valley Authority (TVA), and other sites.

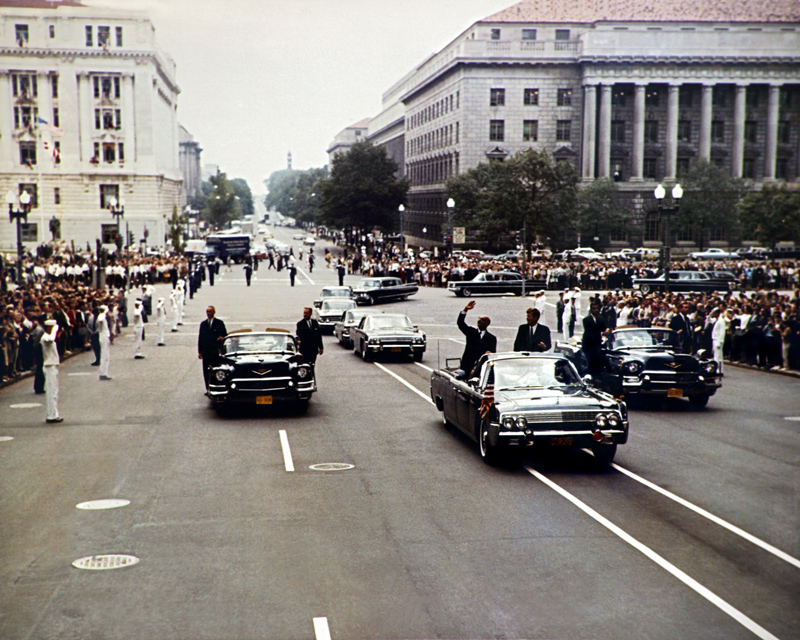
King Zahir Shah of Afghanistan and U.S. President John F. Kennedy in Washington, D.C., two months before his assassination.

At that time the United States declined Afghanistan's request for defense cooperation but extended an economic assistance program focused on the development of Afghanistan's physical infrastructure—roads, dams, and power plants. Later, American aid shifted from infrastructure projects to technical assistance programs to help develop the skills needed to build a modern economy. Contacts between the United States and Afghanistan increased during the 1950s, especially during the Cuban Revolution between 1953 and 1959. While the Soviet Union was supporting Cuba's Fidel Castro, the United States was focusing on Afghanistan for its strategic purposes. This was mainly to counter the spread of communism and the strength of the Soviet Union into South Asia, particularly the Persian Gulf.

President Eisenhower made a state visit to Afghanistan in December 1959 to meet with its leaders. He landed at Bagram Airfield and then drove from there to Kabul in a motorcade. He met with King Zahir Shah, Prime Minister Daoud and a number of high-ranking government officials. He also took a tour of Kabul. After this important visit, the United States began to feel that Afghanistan was safe from ever becoming a Soviet satellite state. From the 1950s to 1979, U.S. foreign assistance provided Afghanistan with more than $500 million in loans, grants, and surplus agricultural commodities to develop transportation facilities, increase agricultural production, expand the educational system, stimulate industry, and improve government administration.

In 1963, King Zahir Shah of Afghanistan made a special state visit to the United States where he was met by John F. Kennedy and Eunice Kennedy Shriver. Zahir Shah also took a special tour of the United States, visiting Disneyland in California, New York City and other places. Habibullah Karzai, uncle of Hamid Karzai who served as representative of Afghanistan at the United Nations, is also believed to have accompanied Zahir Shah in the course of the King's state visit. During this period the Soviets were beginning to feel that the United States was turning Afghanistan into a satellite state. In 1965, Afghanistan and Cuba saw the establishment of communist parties, the Communist Party of Cuba and the People's Democratic Party of Afghanistan (PDPA).

Vice President Spiro Agnew, accompanied by Apollo 10 astronauts Thomas Stafford and Eugene Cernan, visited Kabul during an eleven-nation tour of Asia. At a formal dinner hosted by the Royal Family, the American delegation presented the King with a piece of lunar rock, a small Afghan flag carried on the Apollo 11 flight to the Moon, and photographs of Afghanistan taken from space. By the 1970s, numerous American teachers, engineers, doctors, scholars, diplomats, and explorers had traversed Afghanistan's rugged landscape where they lived and worked. The Peace Corps was active in Afghanistan between 1962 and 1979. Many other American programs were running in the country such as CARE, American Scouting overseas (Afghanistan Scout Association), USAID, and others.

==== Left-wing government, Soviet invasion and civil war ====
After the April 1978 Saur Revolution, relations between the two nations became spotty. While the Democratic Republic regime remained officially nonaligned and opened diplomatic relations with the U.S. by June 1978, as time went on Afghanistan's increasing bond in the Soviet orbit was a cause of concern. Secretary of State Cyrus Vance said at the time "We need to take into account the mix of nationalism and communism in the new leadership and seek to avoid driving the regime into a closer embrace with the Soviet Union than it might wish." The new American Ambassador Adolph "Spike" Dubs told a visiting official in August 1978 that a more positive American approach can reduce Soviet influence, adding that while Afghanistan would still have a pro-Soviet tilt, "it would not be a Soviet satellite, military or otherwise." Dubs also felt that Hafizullah Amin "can't go as far as Tito or even Ceaușescu".

In February 1979, Ambassador Dubs was murdered in Kabul after Afghan security forces burst in on his kidnappers, leading to a deterioration in relations. The U.S. then reduced bilateral assistance and terminated a small military training program. At the same time, the deteriorating internal situation in Afghanistan caused the U.S. to warn the Soviet Union not to intervene. Following Amin's rise as General Secretary, he publicly expressed his desire for friendly relations with the U.S. As the rebellion spread and the security situation deteriorated, U.S. authorities decided on July 23, 1979, to evacuate the families of American nationals in Afghanistan.

The Soviet invasion of Afghanistan became a major concern for the United States, with President Jimmy Carter calling it a "clear threat to the peace". Following the invasion, the United States supported diplomatic efforts to achieve a Soviet withdrawal. In addition, generous American contributions to the refugee program in Pakistan played a major part in efforts to assist Afghan refugees. American efforts also included helping the population living inside Afghanistan. This cross-border humanitarian assistance program aimed at increasing Afghan self-sufficiency and helping resist Soviet attempts to drive civilians out of the rebel-dominated countryside. During the period of Soviet occupation of Afghanistan, the U.S. provided about 3 billion US dollars in military and economic assistance to the Mujahideen groups stationed on the Pakistani side of the Durand Line. The U.S. Embassy in Kabul was closed in January 1989 for security reasons.

The United States welcomed the new Islamic administration that came to power in April 1992 after the fall of the former Soviet-backed government. After this, the Mujahideen groups that won, started a civil war amongst themselves, but the United States's attention was away from Afghanistan at the time.

As with almost every other country in the world, it refused to recognize the new radical Islamist government established by the Taliban and continued supporting the Northern Alliance as the country's legitimate government. The U.S. government did have informal contacts with the Taliban, but relations worsened after Osama bin Laden's fatawā declaring war on the United States and the 1998 United States embassy bombings. After Operation Infinite Reach, Mullah Mohammed Omar made a telephone call to the U.S. State Department demanding that President Bill Clinton resign. The United States refused to provide aid or recognition to the Taliban government unless it expelled bin Laden, which it refused to do under the pashtunwali code demanding that guests be offered sanctuary.

=== NATO and the Karzai administration ===
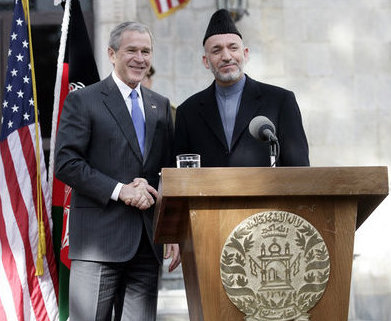
U.S. President George W. Bush with Afghan President Hamid Karzai in Kabul, Afghanistan, on March 1, 2006.

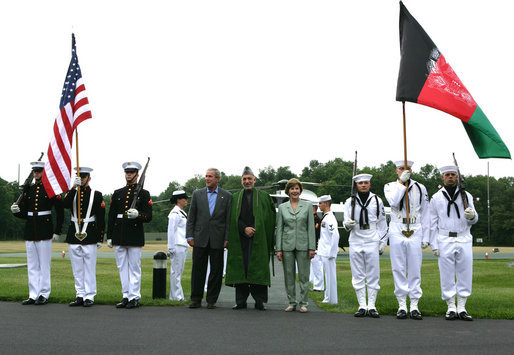
George W. Bush with wife Laura Bush welcoming Afghan President Hamid Karzai at Camp David on 5 August 2007.

Following the September 11 attacks in the United States, believed to be orchestrated by Osama bin Laden who was residing in Afghanistan under asylum at the time, the U.S.-led Operation Enduring Freedom was launched. This major military operation was aimed at removing the Taliban government from power and to capture or kill al Qaeda members, including bin Laden. Following the overthrow of the Taliban, the U.S. supported the new government of President Hamid Karzai by maintaining a high level of troops to establish the authority of his government as well as combat Taliban insurgency. Both Afghanistan and the United States resumed diplomatic ties in late 2001.

The United States took the leading role in the overall reconstruction of Afghanistan by providing billions of dollars to the Afghan National Security Forces, building national roads, government and educational institutions. In 2005, the United States and the Islamic Republic of Afghanistan signed a strategic partnership agreement committing both nations to a long-term relationship. On 1 March 2006, U.S. President George W. Bush along with his wife Laura made a visit to Afghanistan where they greeted American soldiers, met with Afghan officials and later appeared at a special inauguration ceremony at the U.S. Embassy. Although many American politicians have praised Afghan President Hamid Karzai's leadership, he came under fire in 2009 from the Obama administration for his unwillingness to crack down on government corruption. After winning the 2009 presidential election Karzai vowed to tackle the problem. He stated that "individuals who are involved in corruption will have no place in the government."

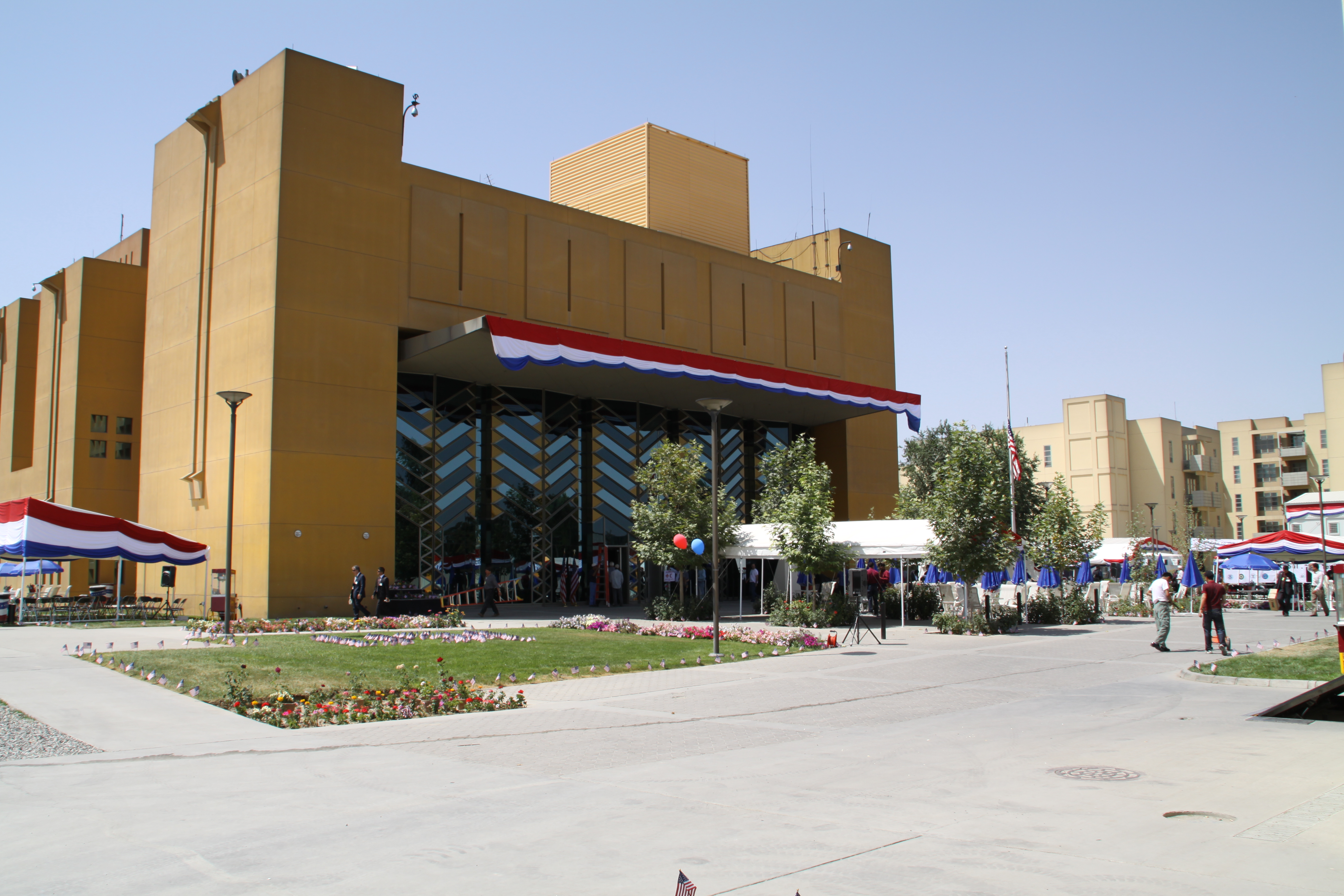
The U.S. Embassy in Kabul, Afghanistan. There was also a U.S. consulate in the city of Herat in the west.

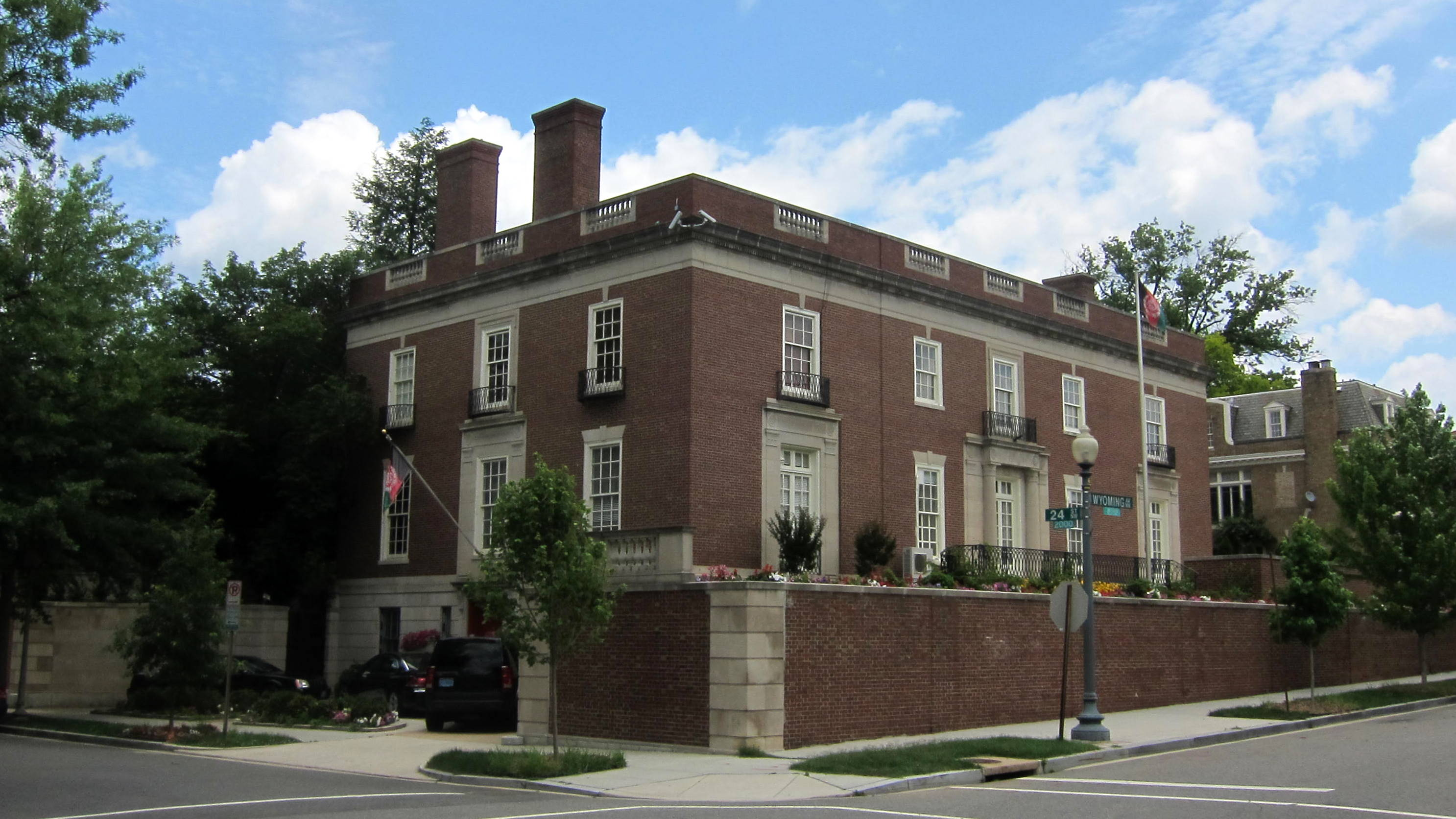
Embassy of Afghanistan in Washington, D.C.

The U.S. Embassy in Kabul began renovation in late 2001 and was expanded several years later. Many high level U.S. politicians, military personnels, celebrities and journalists began visiting Afghanistan. In December 2009, U.S. Ambassador Karl Eikenberry and Afghan officials, after signing a land lease for the mission with Afghan Foreign Minister Rangin Spanta, announced that the United States would open consulates outside Kabul. A first lease-contract was signed in the northern city of Mazar-i-Sharif and a second one in the western city of Herat.

The Islamic Republic of Afghanistan had an embassy in Washington, D.C., as well as consulates in New York City and Los Angeles.

==== Enduring Strategic Partnership Agreement ====
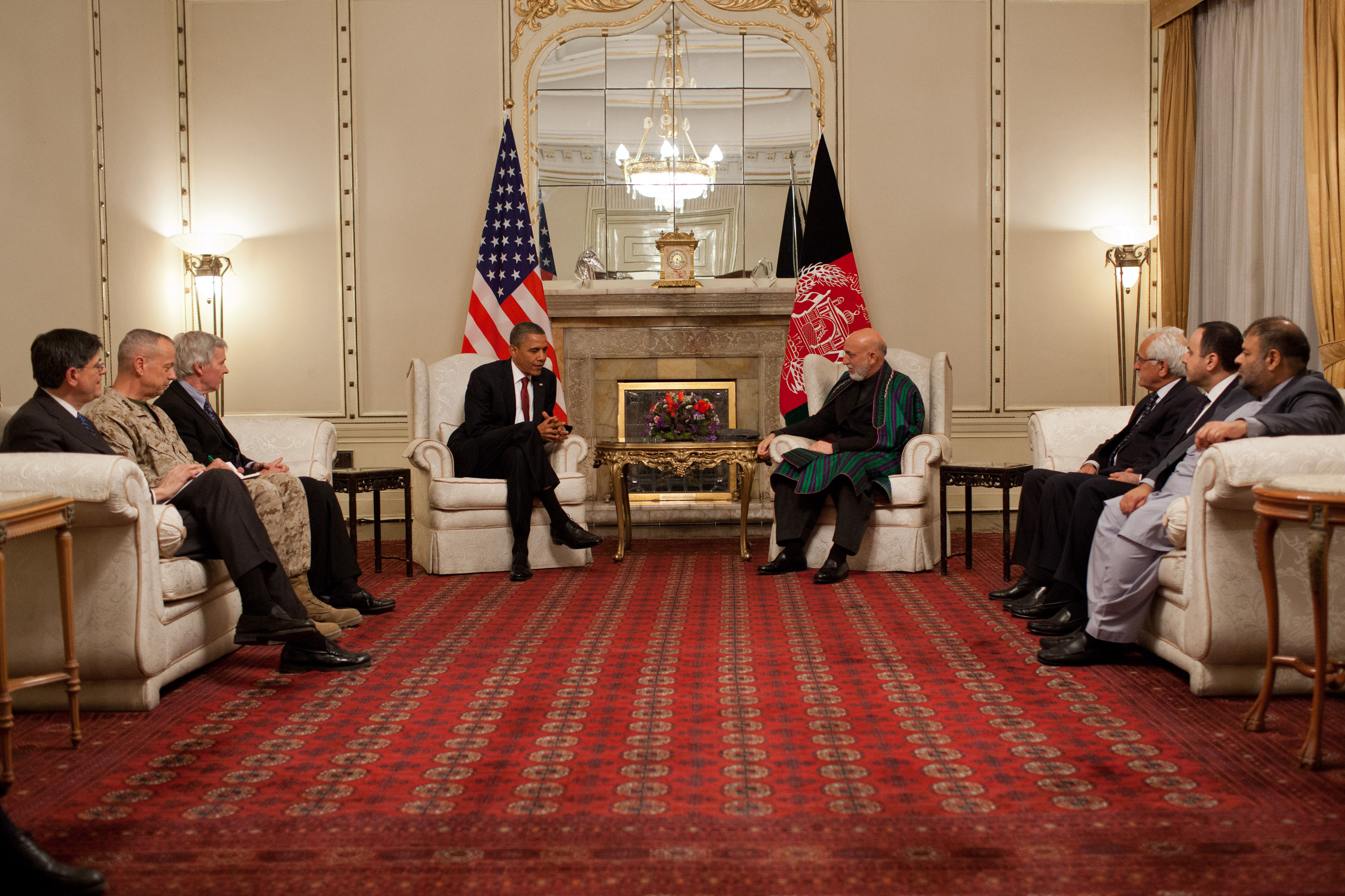
Karzai and U.S. President Barack Obama inside the Presidential Palace on May 2, 2012.

On 2 May 2012, Afghan President Hamid Karzai and the United States President Barack Obama signed a strategic partnership agreement between the two countries, after President Obama arrived in Kabul as part of unannounced trip to Afghanistan on the first anniversary of Osama bin Laden's death. The U.S.-Afghanistan Strategic Partnership Agreement, officially entitled the "Enduring Strategic Partnership Agreement between the Islamic Republic of Afghanistan and the United States of America", provides the long-term framework for the relationship between Afghanistan and the United States of America after the drawdown of U.S. forces in the Afghanistan war. The Strategic Partnership Agreement went into effect on July 4, 2012, as stated by US Secretary of State Hillary Clinton who said on July 8, 2012, at the Tokyo Conference on Afghanistan: "Like a number of countries represented here, the United States and Afghanistan signed a Strategic Partnership Agreement that went into effect four days ago."

On 7 July 2012, as part of the Enduring Strategic Partnership Agreement, the United States designated Afghanistan a major non-NATO ally after U.S. Secretary of State Hillary Clinton arrived in Kabul to meet with President Karzai. She said, "There are a number of benefits that accrue to countries that have this designation... They are able to have access to excess defense supplies, for example, and they can be part of certain kinds of training and capacity building."

=== Military withdrawal and the Ghani administration ===
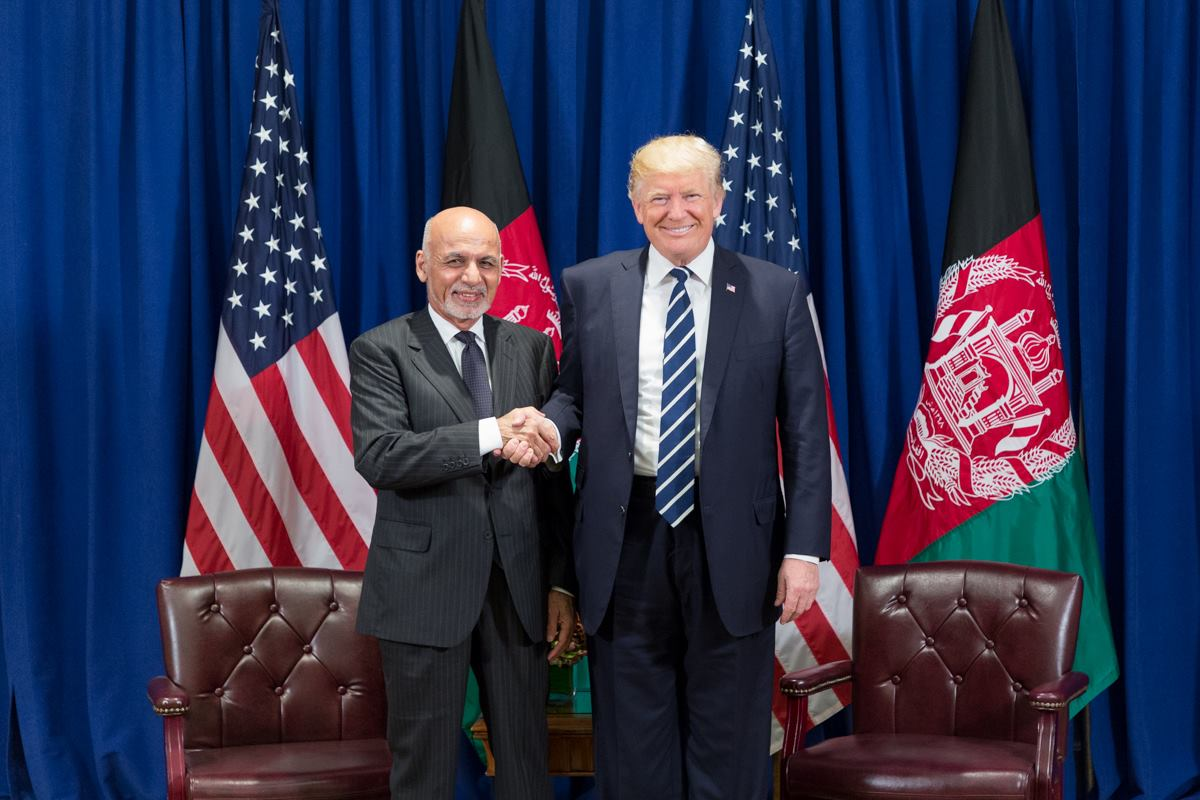
Afghan President Ashraf Ghani with U.S. President Donald Trump in 2017.

The United States Armed Forces have been periodically rising and reducing its troop level in Afghanistan since 2002, reaching a high of about 100,000 in 2010. This was followed by a slow reduction of troops from mid-2011 to the end of 2014. However, Vice President Joe Biden proposed to station more U.S. military forces after 2014. In January 2017, the U.S. decided to send 300 Marines to Afghanistan's Helmand province to assist Afghan security forces to battle Taliban insurgents in intelligence and logistics matters.

American and Afghan officials said after Afghanistan's designation as major non-NATO by the United States in July 2012 that they now must turn to working out a deal that would keep a residual American force in Afghanistan to continue training Afghan soldiers and tracking down insurgents after 2014. Talks on the arrangement have not yet begun according to American officials. Estimates of the number of troops that could stay vary from as little as 10,000 to as many as 25,000 or 30,000. But Secretary Hillary Clinton reiterated on July 7, 2012, that Washington did envision keeping American troops in Afghanistan, where they would provide the kind of air power and surveillance capabilities needed to give Afghan forces an edge over the Taliban. "This is the kind of relationship that we think will be especially beneficial as we do the transition and as we plan for the post-2014 presence", she said. "It will open the door to Afghanistan's military to have a greater capability and a broader kind of relationship with the United States and especially the United States military."

In 2018, the U.S. agreed to reduce their number of troops to 8,600 from approximately 13,000 over the coming months.

==== Afghanistan Papers ====
In December 2019, the Afghanistan Papers revealed that high-ranking military and government officials were generally of the opinion that the war in Afghanistan was unwinnable, but kept this hidden from the public. The report, titled "Lessons Learned", estimates that 40% of U.S. aid to Afghanistan since 2001 ended up in the pockets of corrupt officials, warlords, criminals and insurgents. Ryan Crocker, former ambassador to Afghanistan and Iraq, told the investigators in a 2016 interview, "You just cannot put those amounts of money into a very fragile state and society, and not have it fuel corruption."

==== Peace Agreement between Taliban and United States ====
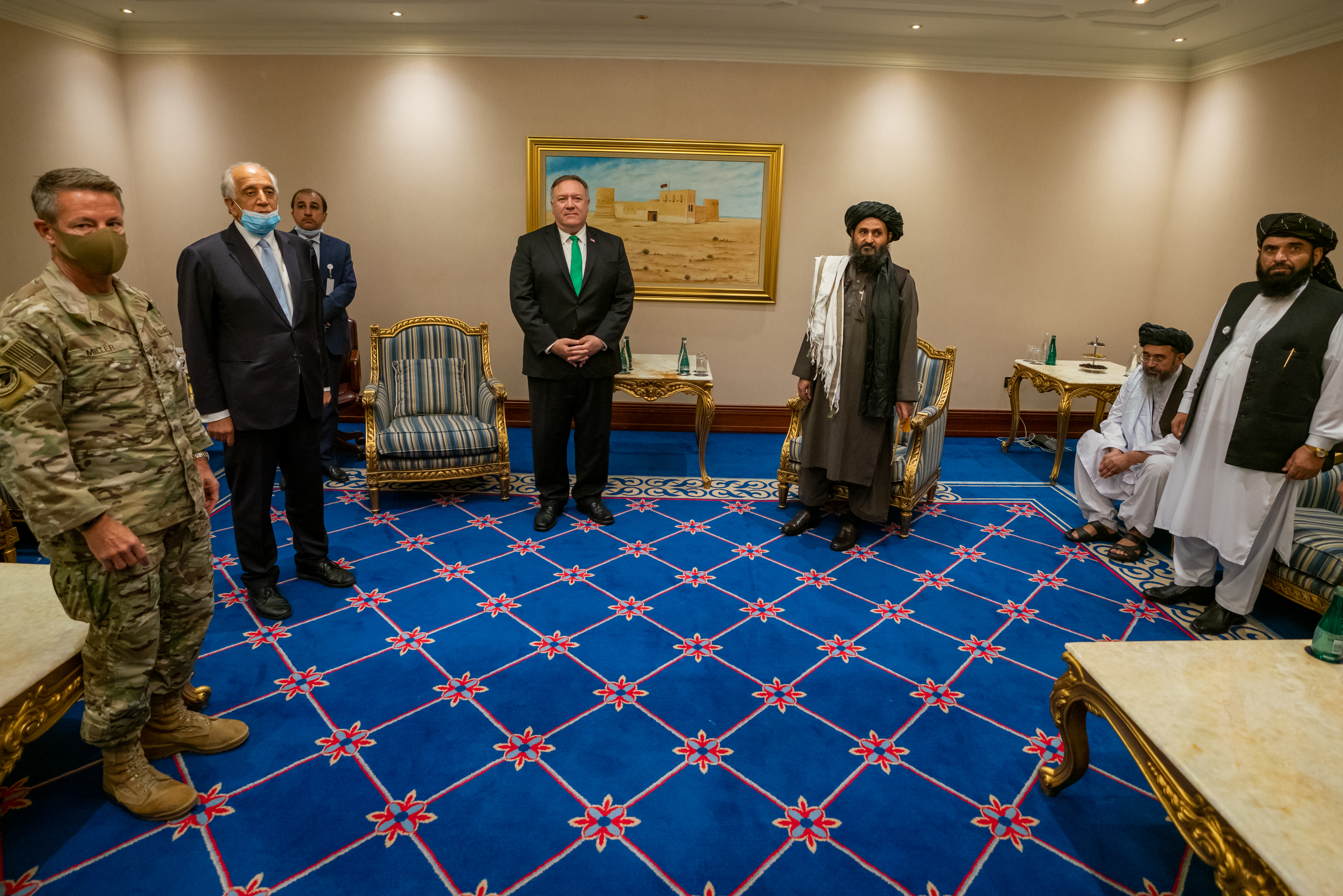
U.S. Secretary of State Mike Pompeo meeting with Taliban delegation in Doha, Qatar, on 12 September 2020

On February 29, 2020, Zalmay Khalilzad (U.S. envoy) and Taliban's Abdul Ghani Baradar signed a conditional peace agreement that paved a path for a significant drawdown of the U.S. military in Afghanistan before May 2021. The agreement also included guarantees from the Taliban that the nation will not be used for any terrorist activities.

The deal explained intra-Afghan negotiation must start the following month, Ghani, the Afghan president, said the Taliban should meet his own conditions of government before entering the talks. The U.S.- Taliban agreement did not call for an immediate cease-fire. In the days just after signing the agreement, fighters of the Taliban carried out dozens of attacks on Afghan security forces. In response to the attack, the United States carried out airstrikes against Taliban troops in the southern province of Helmand.

With the signing of the US-Taliban peace agreement on 29 February 2020, United States and NATO allies agreed to reduce the number of troops stationed in Afghanistan in non-combatant roles over the next 14 months in order to end the war in Afghanistan.

A recent U.S. delegation visit to Kabul emphasized the potential for improved relations between the U.S. and the Taliban, with discussions focusing on the release of American prisoners and the possibility of U.S. investment in Afghanistan's mineral resources. The Taliban, unlike in previous instances, is now seeking concessions in return, including the release of Mohammad Rahim from Guantanamo Bay. The visit, led by Adam Boehler, marks a shift towards diplomatic engagement under the Trump administration, with Zalmay Khalilzad playing a key role in facilitating talks. The delegation also addressed consular services for Afghan citizens in the U.S. and the potential for the Taliban to have an envoy in New York.

==== Developments in 2020 ====
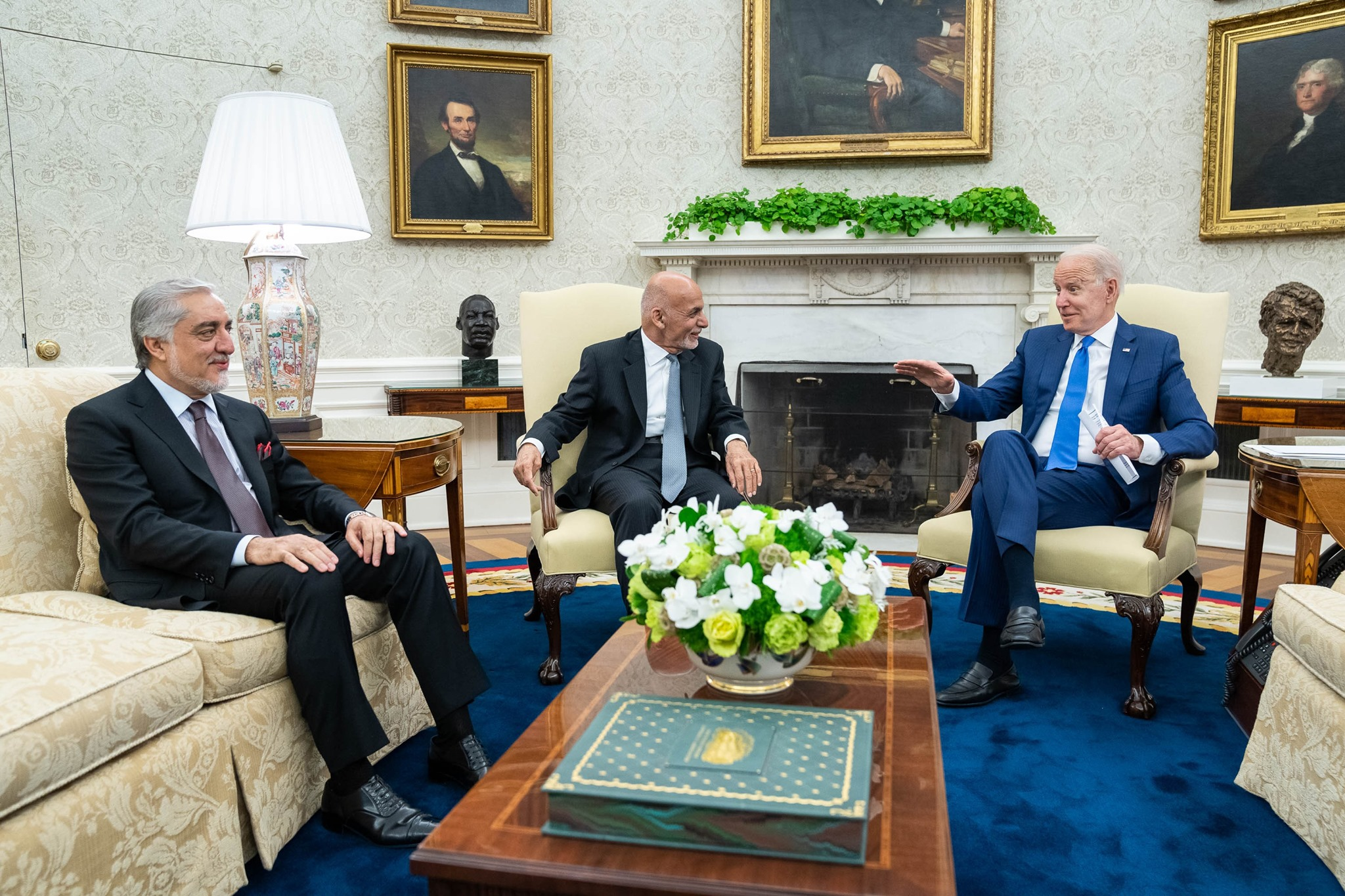
U.S. President Joe Biden meeting with President Ashraf Ghani and Chairman Abdullah Abdullah in June 2021

In the aftermath of this deal, experts at the RAND organization stressed the potentially harmful consequences of reducing troop numbers too quickly, stating that fast removal of troops could result in a "blow to American credibility, the weakening of deterrence and the value of the US reassurance elsewhere, an increased terrorist threat emanating from the Afghan region, and the distinct possibility of a necessary return under worse conditions." One of the four main issues within the signed peace agreement was a "reduction in violence", i.e., a cease fire, between Afghan, American, and Taliban troops in order to facilitate an environment in which U.S. troops could leave the region and ensure the peaceful onset of intra-Afghanistan Taliban-Afghan peace negotiations.

However, less than a week after the US-Taliban peace agreements violence in Afghanistan continued, with two ISIL gunmen killing 32 civilians and wounding at least 58 in crowd of people attending a political event hosted by the opposition leader Abdullah Abdullah on 6 March, and a Taliban ambush attack on the police and army outpost in Zabul Province killing 24 Afghan security forces on March 20, 2020. The Afghan Ministry of Defense reacted to the Taliban's attack by stating that the "Afghan National Defense Security Forces will not leave this attack without response, and will take the revenge of the blood of the martyrs", threatening the signatory's commitment to reduce violence between their forces.

Plans for negotiations between the Afghans and Taliban leadership were further complicated not only by continued violence between the two sides, but also due to a presidential election that led to a governmental split, with President Ghani and Abdullah Abdullah "separately taking the oath of office" in individual ceremonies on 9 March. Furthermore, with the sudden outbreak of COVID-19, US troop withdrawal was complicated by quarantine methods necessitated by directives from the Pentagon requiring returning troops to be placed in short-term quarantine.

According to the New York Times, "at least 300 troops from the 82nd Airborne division returning from Afghanistan have had to self-quarantine at Fort Bragg, N.C., and dozens more from the 1st Armored Division are doing the same at Fort Bliss, Tex."

==== Withdrawal of U.S troops ====
On April 13, 2021, US President Joe Biden announced the withdrawal of all remaining troops in Afghanistan by September 11, 2021. The withdrawal began on May 1, and the Taliban concurrently launched a nationwide offensive. Kabul fell on August 15, and the Islamic Republic was dissolved. The next day, Biden admitted to the press that his administration did not anticipate the Taliban would reach Kabul so fast. The US officially completed its withdrawal from Afghanistan on August 30, upon which the Taliban claimed victory. The U.S. Embassy in Kabul—having relocated to Hamid Karzai International Airport on August 15—suspended operations in Afghanistan on August 31 and relocated to Doha, Qatar. On November 12, 2021, the U.S. announced that an interests section would open at the Embassy of Qatar in Kabul on December 31, to serve as the protecting power for the U.S. in Afghanistan. The Islamic Republic's diplomatic missions to the U.S. operated independently for several months before shutting down operations and transferring custody of the properties to the U.S. State Department on March 16, 2022. Afghanistan has no protecting power in the U.S., though those in the U.S. needing Afghan consular services are referred to the missions in Canada through an informal arrangement with the U.S. State Department.

As many as 150,000 Afghans who assisted the United States remained in Afghanistan, including individuals who worked closely with US military forces.

==== Deals under the Biden administration ====
On January 21, 2025, two Americans held in Afghanistan were released in exchange for a Taliban fighter in the United States. The deal was brokered by Qatar and finalized in the final hours of the outgoing Biden administration.

==== Revocation of Temporary Protected Status for Afghans ====
In 2025, the Trump administration moved to end the Temporary Protected Status (TPS) for approximately 14,600 Afghans, citing that conditions in Afghanistan no longer met TPS criteria. This decision, made amid ongoing Taliban rule and humanitarian crisis, sparked criticism from refugee groups and political figures who argued that returning Afghans would expose them to persecution. TPS had allowed Afghans to stay in the US due to safety concerns after the 2021 US military withdrawal. The revocation was set for May 2025, affecting many who had been relocated following the US evacuation of over 82,000 Afghans. Critics highlighted the continuing instability, including Taliban human rights abuses, as justification for maintaining their protected status.

==== Bagram airbase ====
By July 2021, US had vacated the Bagram Airfield as part of the 2020-2021 US troop withdrawal from Afghanistan. The American personnel had reportedly left without informing the new Afghan base commander.

In September 2025, Donald Trump said he was eyeing Bagram Air Base in Afghanistan. "If Afghanistan doesn't give Bagram Air Base back to the people who built it, the United States of America," he said, “bad things are going to happen!" The Taliban announced that the Afghans would never hand over the base to any third country. At a meeting in Moscow, Afghanistan's neighbors also opposed US Bagram plan. Afghanistan deputy information minister Zabihullah Mujahid asserted that Afghanistan would not permit any foreign control over its territory under any circumstances, firmly opposing the return of a foreign military presence. Echoing this stance, Afghan Foreign Ministry official Zakir Jalaly rejected the prospect of Bagram Airfield being handed back to the United States. Additionally, members of the Moscow Format of Consultations on Afghanistan rejected foreign military presence in Afghanistan in a joint statement.

=== Taliban regime (2021–present) ===
Since the Taliban takeover of Afghanistan in 2021, the Taliban has repeatedly called upon the United States to reopen their embassy in Kabul and establish relations with the government of the Islamic Emirate of Afghanistan. However, the United States continues to reject any bilateral ties with the Taliban unless they improve their human rights track record.

== Arms trade ==
The United States sold $15,892,402,425 worth of weapons to Afghanistan between 1950 and 2020, two thirds of which were exchanged since 2016.

== Cultural relations ==
The American occupation contributed to the Westernization of Afghanistan. However, only some of those historical influences have remained with the resumption of Taliban rule.

== Public opinion ==
According to a BBC poll conducted from 2005 to 2006, the U.S. was the most favored country in Afghanistan, in a field also consisting of Iran, China, Russia, France, Japan, EU, Britain and India.

A national poll in Afghanistan conducted by the BBC, ABC News and ARD in 2009 found that 47% of people had a favorable view of the U.S., down from 65% in 2007 and 83% in 2005.

== Frozen Afghan reserves ==
In February 2022, US President Joe Biden signed an order releasing $7bn in frozen Afghan central bank reserves, which had been frozen since the Taliban came to power. The reserves were proposed to be split between humanitarian efforts for the Afghan people and American victims of terrorism, including relatives of 9/11.

Following a devastating magnitude 5.9 earthquake in June 2022, the Taliban has repeatedly called for the United States to unfreeze its foreign assets. The group also requested for the US to reduce sanctions in hopes that it would allow for a better recovery process. The Taliban also called for an international humanitarian assistance, in which the US provided $55 million.

In August 2022, the Biden administration decided it would not release the US$7 billion held by the Afghan Central Bank on U.S. soil. After a recent U.S. terrorism intervention in central Kabul, killing al Qa’ida leader Ayman al-Zawahiri, the U.S. abandoned earlier talks with the Taliban because of international security reasons. In a letter sent to U.S. President Joe Biden and Treasury Secretary Janet Yellen, a number of renowned international economists called for Washington and other nations to release US$9 billion in Afghan central bank assets because "without access to its foreign reserves, the central bank of Afghanistan cannot carry out its normal, essential functions."

In mid-September 2022, the Biden administration decided to transfer $3.5 billion in Afghan central bank assets to the Swiss-based Bank for International Settlements (BIS), which supports the liquidity of central banks. The governing Taliban had condemned the transfer and insisted on direct payments to the Afghan Central Bank.

== See also ==
- Afghan Americans – Americans of Afghan birth or descent
- Anti-Afghan sentiment in the United States
- CIA activities in Afghanistan
- Foreign relations of Afghanistan
- Foreign relations of the United States
- 2025 Washington, D.C., National Guard shooting
- Deportation of Afghan immigrants from the United States
