= Phantom aid in Afghanistan =

Phantom aid in Afghanistan is widespread. Despite having received approximately $35 billion of international aid between 2002 and 2009, much of this aid has not helped ease poverty or improve economic and living conditions in the nation.

== Afghanistan ==
Afghanistan is a low-income country with GDP per capita of US$507 in 2019. The country ranks 181 in the Human Development Index (HDI). It has been heavily reliant on foreign aid in the past. In 2011, aid accounted for more than 90 percent of the national budget. The country's infant mortality rates are very high, the national literacy rate is at 37 percent. Its unemployment rate is at 13.7 percent.

Within a series of interviews conducted by the office of the Special Inspector General for Afghanistan Reconstruction's Lessons Learned Program, one interviewee estimated that 40% of U.S. aid to Afghanistan since 2001 ended up in the pockets of corrupt officials, warlords, criminals and insurgents.

== Donors ==
Donor countries for Afghanistan include the United States and Canada. The aid provided under guidelines of the Development Assistance Committee of the Organisation for Economic Co-operation and Development is known as Official Development Assistance (ODA). This form of aid has to be undertaken by the donor country's official sector, with promotion of economic development and welfare as the main objective and concessional financial terms.

Currently administered aid is inadequate as it has fallen short of the amount initially promised, 0.7% of the donor countries' GNI.

There are also problems with how the given aid is utilised. A form of phantom aid is conditional aid or tied aid. This happens when aid is tied to the purchase of products such as armaments. Expenditure on foreign technical assistance, inflated salaries of foreigners to work in Afghanistan and home office expenses in U.S are other examples of how aid has been mislabeled. Donor countries, prioritizing their national reputation over helping Afghanistan overcome its development and growth challenges, have built 'quick impact projects' like cheap roads and buildings in the recipient country. Such inconsequential uses of aid have accounted for 86 percent of total American aid.

This has also been the case with Canada's aid scheme. 60 percent of Canadian aid has been restricted to the purchase of Canadian products only. This is an example of tied aid. Such practises have caused food produce from Canada to arrive several months later than usual, leading to a reduction in sale prices for local farmers.

Private enterprises from donor countries have been looting much of the aid. This has resulted in bad usage of 35 to 40 percent of total international aid. An Afghan-American expatriate who has worked with foreign contractors in Afghanistan said, "The international companies are more corrupt than the local companies because they’re here short-term, tax-exempt, make a profit and leave." Dictation by foreign institutions, such as the World Bank, IMF and UNDP, and donor countries on how aid should be spent has led to the democratically elected Afghan government losing control over aid distribution.

== Effects ==
Afghanistan's economy or living standards have not improved despite donor countries claiming that they have poured sizable foreign donations and investments into Afghanistan. For example, the country's health condition remains a serious poverty issue and has seen a fall in annual health expenditure from 2005. The long timings for the arrival of food products from Canada has been detrimental to the nation’s economy as agriculture constitutes 31.6 percent of total GDP. As reported by Norah Niland, the representative for UN High Commissioner for Human Rights in Afghanistan, "Patronage, corruption, impunity and over-emphasis on short-term goals rather than targeted long-term development are exacerbating a situation of dire poverty."
