= Tied aid =

International transfer of resources with geographic limits on procurement and spending

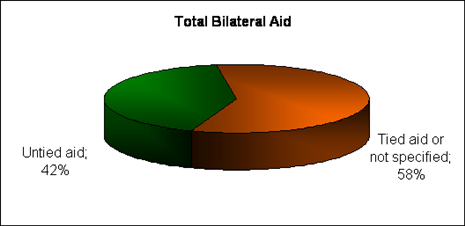
Distributions of tied and untied aid worldwide in 2006

Tied aid is a kind of foreign aid which must be spent on products and services provided by companies from the country providing the aid (the donor country) or in a group of specified countries.

A developed country provides a bilateral loan or grant to a developing country, but mandates that the money be spent on goods or services produced in the selected country. Conversely, untied aid is a type of foreign aid with no geographical restrictions.

In 2006, the Organisation for Economic Co-operation and Development (OECD) estimated that about half Official Development Assistance is tied aid.

== Definition ==
The OECD's full definition of tied aid is:

Tied aid credits are official or officially supported loans, credits, or associated financing packages where the procurement of the goods or services involved is limited to the donor country or to a group of countries that does not include substantially all developing countries (or Central and Eastern European Countries (CEECs)/New Independent States (NIS) in transition).

== Motivations ==
The OECD report The Tying of Aid written by Catrinus Jepma found that the motivations for tying aid were both economical and political. From an economic standpoint, the donor country aims to raise its exports by tying the aid to domestic companies. However, the study found minimal exports related to tied aid. The report referred to an earlier study that examined the relationship between exports from nine representative European donors and thirty-two representative developing countries. That study found that exports connected to tied aid constituted about four percent of the total. The Tying of Aid thus concluded that political motivations were more important than economical. Historical relations, trade relationships, geopolitical interests, and cultural ties are all examples of the political motivations behind the tying of aid but, according to Jepma, they all boiled down to the same thing, "Although most donors give aid to quite a wide variety of recipients, the importance they attach to individual recipients differs: donors support countries with which they have or hope to have strong ties."

== Costs to aid recipients ==
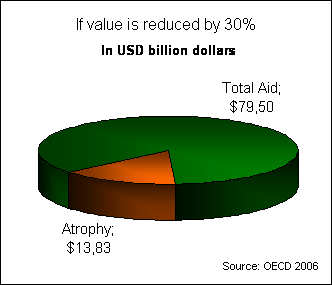
Value reduced by 30%

Value reduced by 20%

It is difficult to accurately estimate the related costs to the aid recipient for various reasons. For example, even if a donor ties its aid, it may be that the donor already has the most competitive prices. The donor may also have a limited ability to enforce aid ties in the recipient country, theoretically making ties ineffective. Even so, the OECD has made some general remarks on the costs:

Aid tying by OECD donor countries has important consequences for developing countries. Tying aid to specific commodities and services, or procurement in a specific country or region, can increase development project costs by as much as 20 to 30 percent.

If donors claim that 42 percent of bilateral aid is untied, one can assume that the remaining 58 is tied. In 2004, total bilateral aid amounted to US$79.5 billion. In OECD's worst-case scenario, tying aid can reduce its value by as much as 30 percent. If that were true in all cases, it would translate to a reduction in value of US$13.9 billion for the recipients. If the value is reduced by 20 percent on average, it would equal a loss of US$9.2 billion.

== Untied aid ==
Untied aid is assistance given to developing countries which can be used to purchase goods and services in virtually all countries. It is contrasted with tied aid, which stipulates that goods and services bought with it can only be purchased from the donor country or from a limited selection of countries.

One of the main arguments in favour of untied aid is that tied aid can create important distortions in the market by limiting the number of countries in which the recipient can make purchases. The limitations impede the recipient country's ability to find the most cost-effective way to spend the aid they receive. It is estimated that goods and services purchased with tied aid cost 15-30% more than comparable goods and services acquired with untied aid. Furthermore, tied aid often favours capital-intensive goods and advising primarily in the donor country's area of expertise. That may lead recipient countries to make purchases which are inappropriate for realising their development goals.

In addition, the administration of tied aid requires larger bureaucracies in both the donor and recipient countries. Untying aid would presumably give recipient countries greater freedom to choose how they spend their resources, focusing on the goods and services they need most and allowing them to purchase from the most cost-effective sources. Untying aid would allow it to be more efficiently employed, effectively increasing its value.

== The problems of untying aid ==
The tying of aid is a form of protectionism; however, the literature on this particular subject is limited. One of the major problems in untying aid is the prisoner's dilemma. Donors who want to abolish the practice will see their interests damaged if the other donors do not follow.

In 2001, the donor members of the Development Assistance Committee (DAC), an OECD subcommittee, agreed to virtually untie all aid to the Least Developed Countries. That recommendation became effective on January 1, 2002. In addition, Australia, Finland, France, Germany, Ireland, Japan, the Netherlands, Norway, Portugal, Sweden, Switzerland, and the United Kingdom have untied their aid beyond the recommendation's requirements.

Further progress on this particular issue is being implemented as part of the Paris Declaration on Aid Effectiveness. However, of the 12 indicators included, untying bilateral aid is the only item without a deadline.

=== Arguments for and against tied aid ===
Tied aid increases the total cost of the assistance. It tends to make donors focus more on their own countries' commercial advancement rather than the developing countries' needs. When recipient nations are required to spend aid on products from the donor nation, project costs can be raised by up to 30 percent. Tied aid can create distortions in the market and impede the recipient country's ability to spend the aid it receives. There are growing concerns about the use of tied aid as well as efforts to analyze the quality of aid rather than the quantity. The Commitment to Development Index, which measures the "development friendliness" of rich countries, actually penalizes donor governments for tied aid when calculating the index.

Others have argued that tying aid to donor-country products is common sense; it is a strategic use of aid to promote the donor country's business or exports. Tied aid improves donors' export performance and creates business for local companies and jobs. It also helps expose firms lacking international experience in the global market. It is further argued that tied aid, if well-designed and effectively managed, would not necessarily compromise the quality and effectiveness of aid (Aryeetey, 1995; Sowa 1997). However, this argument does not hold for all types of aid; in the case of program aid, for example, aid is tied to specific projects or policies and has limited commercial interest. Maximizing commercial benefits to the donor country rarely maximizes aid effectiveness to the recipient country. Thus, when aiming to maximize development, pursuing commercial benefits to the donor country may reduce aid effectiveness.

== Examples ==
In the United Kingdom, the Overseas Development Administration (ODA), was under the supervision of the Foreign Secretary and the Foreign, Commonwealth and Development Office, which led, on at least one occasion, to allegations of a connection between granting aid and achieving either foreign policy goals or British companies winning export orders. A scandal erupted concerning the UK funding of a hydroelectric dam on the Pergau River in Malaysia, near the Thai border. Building work began in 1991 with money from the UK foreign aid budget. Concurrently, the Malaysian government bought around £1 billion worth of arms from the UK. The suggested linkage of arms deals to aid became the subject of a UK government inquiry in March 1994. In November 1994, after an application for judicial review brought by the World Development Movement, the High Court held that the then Foreign Secretary, Douglas Hurd had acted ultra vires (outside of his power and therefore illegally) by allocating £234 million towards the dam's funding because it was not of economic or humanitarian benefit to the Malaysian people . In 1997, the administration of the UK's aid budget was removed from the Foreign Secretary's remit with the establishment of the Department for International Development (DfID) which replaced the ODA.

Tied aid is now illegal in the UK by the International Development Act, which came into effect June 17, 2002, replacing the Overseas Development and Co-operation Act (1980).

== See also ==
- Aid
- Phantom aid
