= Official development assistance =

Type of international aid

Net official development assistance and aid received

Official development assistance (ODA) is a category used by the Development Assistance Committee (DAC) of the Organisation for Economic Co-operation and Development (OECD) to measure foreign aid. The DAC first adopted the concept in 1969. It is widely used as an indicator of international aid flow. It refers to material resources given by the governments of richer countries to promote the economic development of poorer countries and the welfare of their people. The donor government agency may disburse such resources to the government of the recipient country or through other organizations. Most ODA is in the form of grants, but some is measured as the concessional value in soft (low-interest) loans.

In 2019, the annual amount of state donor aid counted as ODA was US$168 billion, of which US$152 billion came from DAC donors.

== Concept and definition ==
In order to co-ordinate and measure international aid effectively, the DAC needs its members to have agreed clear criteria for what is counted as aid. The precise type of aid to be counted was given the name of official development assistance (ODA) (where "official" indicates that the aid is public and from governments).

The full definition of ODA is:

Flows of official financing administered with the promotion of the economic development and welfare of developing countries as the main objective, and which are concessional in character with a grant element of at least 25 percent (using a fixed 10 percent rate of discount). By convention, ODA flows comprise contributions of donor government agencies, at all levels, to developing countries ("bilateral ODA") and to multilateral institutions. ODA receipts comprise disbursements by bilateral donors and multilateral institutions.

— OECD, Glossary of Statistical Terms

In other words, ODA needs to contain the three elements:

1. undertaken by the official sector (official agencies, including state and local governments, or their executive agencies)
2. with promotion of economic development and welfare as the main objective; and
3. at concessional financial terms (if a loan, having a grant element of at least 25 per cent).

This definition is used to exclude development aid from the two other categories of aid from DAC members:

- Official Aid (OA): Flows which meet conditions of eligibility for inclusion in Official Development Assistance (ODA), other than the fact that the recipients are on Part II of the Development Assistance Committee (DAC) List of Aid Recipients.
- Other Official Flows (OOF): Transactions by the official sector with countries on the List of Aid Recipients which do not meet the conditions for eligibility as Official Development Assistance or Official Aid, either because they are not primarily aimed at development, or because they have a grant element of less than 25 percent.

For example:

- If a donor country accords a grant or a concessional loan to Afghanistan it is classified as ODA, because it is on the Part I list.
- If a donor country accords a grant or a concessional loan to Bahrain it is classified as OA, because it is on the Part II list.
- If a donor country gives military assistance to any other country or territory it is classified as OOF, because it is not aimed at development.

=== Developments since inception ===
The concept of ODA was adopted by the OECD DAC in 1969, creating a standard of international aid based on "promoting the economic and social development of developing countries" in a way that was "intended to be concessional in character". This clarified previous conceptions of aid or development assistance; some grants and loans were now differently categorized as "other official flows (OOF)". It marked an advance on the effort to define aid that had been made in the DAC's 1962 "Directives for reporting aid and resource flows to developing countries". The establishment of ODA provided a basis for most DAC members to commit to the target, set by the United Nations General Assembly in 1970, that economically advanced countries should devote 0.7% of their national incomes to international aid.

The definition of ODA was made firmer in 1972, specifying that qualifying loans should have a grant element of at least 25%. At the same time, donors (except Italy) adopted a target that at least 84% of their overall ODA should be grant, or count as grant element, rather than commercially repayable loan. This proportion was increased to 86% in 1978.

The legitimacy of "tied aid" (aid dependent on the use of exports from the donor country) had been debated periodically in the DAC. In 1992 the DAC adopted rules for ODA restricting tied aid to lower-income countries and less "commercially viable" projects: restrictions that had been pushed by the U.S. to reduce protectionism in the world trading system. The DAC made a further recommendation on untying in 2001.

In 2012 the DAC began a process of modernizing its statistical system and reforming some of the ways in which ODA is counted. In 2014 the DAC donors agreed that ODA should measure the "grant equivalent" of loans estimated at the time of the loan, rather than loan inflows and outflows as they occurred. It took five years, however, before this was implemented. Between 2016 and 2018 the rules were clarified for counting incidental developmental contributions by foreign military forces when deployed in underdeveloped countries for peace and security purposes. In this period there was also clarification of the criteria for counting some in-donor refugee costs as humanitarian assistance ODA. In 2019, the DAC switched its main reporting of ODA loans to the grant equivalent basis. But this approach creates problems for the accounting of debt relief within ODA, and donors only reached consensus on how to treat this in 2020.

As of 2020, two major items remained as works in progress in the aid modernization agenda: the counting of aid provided through private sector instruments (PSIs), and the construction of a system for measuring broader contributions to global public goods in support of the 2030 Agenda for Sustainable Development. The latter type of aid is expected to be recorded as Total Official Support for Sustainable Development (TOSSD), and will be a separate category from ODA.

=== 0.7% target ===
The target of spending 0.7% of gross national income on ODA is the best known international aid target. It was formalised on 24 October 1970, when the UN General Assembly adopted a resolution which included the goal that "Each economically advanced country will progressively increase its official development assistance to the developing countries and will exert its best efforts to reach a minimum net amount of 0.7% of its gross national product at market prices by the middle of the Decade [by 1975]." Sweden and the Netherlands were the first countries to meet the target, in 1974, but it has been met by few other countries since.

=== Overall quantity ===
In 2019, the annual amount of state donor aid counted as ODA was US$168 billion, of which US$152 billion came from DAC donors. In the decade 2010–2019, average annual ODA was US$151.5 billion (in 2018 prices).

Historically, the amount of ODA disbursed every year rose approximately four-fold in real terms during the 60 years from 1960. In 2025, aid from OECD Development Assistance Committee donor countries dropped by 23% after adjusting for inflation, the biggest annual decline on record. The level was rather stagnant up to 1973 (although inflation meant that it grew in nominal terms). It generally rose from 1973 to 1992, then declined to 1997, then increased again.

=== ODA as a proportion of donor national incomes ===
The proportion of their combined gross national income (GNI) spent by DAC donors on ODA decreased from over 0.5% in 1961 to less than 0.3% in 1973. After that, while donors' incomes continued to grow, the level of ODA remained around 0.3 - 0.35%, except when it dipped below that level in the late 1990s and early 2000s. The USA - the donor with the largest economy - spent more than 0.5% of its GNI on ODA prior to 1966, but this proportion gradually dropped, reaching a low point of 0.1% in the late 1990s, and standing at 0.15% in 2019.

=== Quantities of ODA from leading donors ===
Since 1960 the five largest donors of ODA have been: the US, Germany, the UK, Japan and France. See chart on the right.

The top 10 donors of ODA (by absolute amount transferred) in 2019 were: United States, Germany, United Kingdom, France, Japan, Turkey, Netherlands, Sweden, Canada and Italy. See pie chart below. Of these, Turkey is the only non-member of the DAC. Turkey's large ODA contribution is associated with the great numbers of Syrian refugees in the country.

=== Donor countries by percentage of gross national income ===
The OECD also lists countries by the amount of ODA they give as a percentage of their gross national income. In 2019 six countries met the longstanding UN target for an ODA/GNI ratio of 0.7%. The ratios of the five most generous donors in this sense, and the five highest-volume donors, are shown in the chart below. In 2021, the UK reduced its annual aid budget from 0.7% of gross national income to 0.5%.

ODA as % of GNI: the five most generous donors, and the five biggest donors in 2019
Donor	ODA as % of GNI in 2019
Turkey : 1.15%	1.15
Norway : 1.03%	1.03
Luxembourg : 1.03%	1.03
Sweden : 0.96%	0.96
Denmark : 0.72%	0.72
United Kingdom : 0.70%	0.70
Germany : 0.61%	0.61
France : 0.44%	0.44
Japan : 0.30%	0.30
United States : 0.15%	0.15

=== Quantities of ODA by recipient country ===
In 2019, Syria was the focus of more ODA than any other country, at $10.3 billion. Next were Ethiopia ($4.8 billion), Bangladesh ($4.5 billion), Yemen ($4.4 billion) and Afghanistan ($4.3 billion). China, Indonesia and Thailand were negative recipients: their repayments of past ODA loans were higher than their new receipts.

According to estimates that the OECD made in 2014, 28 countries with an aggregate population of around 2 billion people will cease to be ODA eligible by 2030. They include emerging markets such as China, Brazil, Mexico, Argentina, Malaysia, Thailand and Turkey.

=== Multilateral ODA ===
Most ODA is bilateral, meaning that its state donor is identifiable at the point of delivery to intended beneficiaries. Multilateral ODA, on the other hand, is aid given into a pool administered by some intermediate organisation, so that the delivered aid is no longer attributable to a particular original state donor. In 2019, 28% of all ODA was multilateral. The main organizations for multilateral ODA were the European Union, the IDA (the concessional lending branch of the World Bank), regional development banks and UN agencies.

=== Tied ODA ===
Tied aid is aid given on condition that the money is used to buy things from the donor country or a severely limited group of countries. The legitimacy of tied ODA has long been a point of contention within the DAC. Targets have been set to reduce tying: for example in the 2005 Paris Declaration and the DAC's "Recommendation" on untying, first agreed in 1998 and subsequently maintained in revised forms. Official monitoring of performance against these targets is, however, undermined by a discrepancy between what the OECD calls de jure and de facto rates of tying, i.e. what the donors report and what they do. A major review of the Paris Declaration targets found that, in 2009, 51% (by value) of contracts was spent in the country of the donor, even though donors were reporting only 14% of their aid as tied. The report pointed out that most DAC members failed to use a public bulletin board to advertise contract tenders. The OECD's 2020 report on tied aid found this failure was still widespread. Hence the official statistics on tied ODA must be treated with caution.

In 2019 five DAC members declared giving more than half of their ODA in the form of tied aid (Greece 100%, Hungary 78%, Poland 75%, Slovenia 74%, Austria 55%). The largest donor, the US, gave almost 40% of its ODA as tied aid, amounting to US$11.0 billion. Overall, DAC donors in 2019 reported US$22.1 billion – about 20% – of their ODA as tied aid. Historically, the reported proportion of tied aid dropped from about 50% in 1979 to less than 10% in 2003, but rose again, and fluctuated between 15 and 20% between 2007 and 2019 (see chart on the right). This was despite agreement by the donors in the 2005 Paris Declaration to further reduce their tying of aid.

While the last paragraph refers to the proportion of tied aid in overall ODA, the DAC "Recommendation" on untying applies only to Low-Income Countries and a few other countries. In 2018, 87% of all DAC ODA to these countries was reported as being untied. While 19 of the 30 DAC members claimed to have untied more than 90% of their ODA to these countries, the average was dragged down mainly by the United States, which reported only 64% untied aid to these recipients. (The United States, however, was one of the few DAC countries that systematically posted open tenders for its untied aid on a public bulletin board.)

== Problem areas and alternatives ==
=== Problem areas ===
ODA is widely acknowledged to be an untidy and somewhat arbitrary category of aid, its definition having been agreed by the DAC members only with difficulty and awkward compromises. Arbitrariness is seen in the fixing of the qualifying rates of loan concessionality and the applied discount rates. While in the past these rates were set at 25% and 10% respectively, as of 2021 the rates are different for different kinds of recipient but may still be regarded as in some ways arbitrary.

The criterion that ODA must primarily serve "economic development and welfare" leads to dissatisfaction because these two things are often seen as different priorities, and there are differing views about what actions are effective in leading toward development. For example, some stakeholders are particularly interested in progress toward economic convergence of rich and poor countries, and for this purpose the inclusion of humanitarian aid within ODA can seem an interference.

Seen as a measure of donor countries' contribution to a common effort or to altruistic purposes, ODA is criticized for including expenditures that may mostly benefit the donor country or that are already included in that country's international legal obligations. Such types of spending include tied aid, administrative costs, imputed costs of education for foreign students in the donor country, subsistence of refugees inside donor countries, and "development awareness" programmes in donor countries.

The counting of loans in ODA is problematic. Until 2018, loan disbursements were counted in full as aid in the year they were given, and repayments were negative aid in the year they were returned. Some DAC members considered this method "did not reflect actual efforts by donor countries" (perhaps particularly when looking at an individual year). So in 2014 the DAC decided to record the "grant equivalent" of loans as ODA in the year the loan was agreed. This involves complex estimation: the exact methodology took years to finalize and was only first implemented in 2019. Even then, there was no agreement in the DAC on how to treat debt relief. When this agreement was reached, in 2020, it was criticized by commentators as producing a situation in which risky loans, subsequently defaulted, could count for as much ODA as simply giving a grant for the whole amount, yet cost less to the donor if some of the repayments have been made.

=== Alternatives ===
Recognizing that ODA does not capture all the expenditures that promote development, the International TOSSD Task Force started establishing a wider statistical framework called TOSSD (Total Official Support for Sustainable Development) that would count spending on "international public goods". The TOSSD data for 2020 shows more than US$355 billion disbursed to support for sustainable development, from almost 100 provider countries and institutions. In March 2022, TOSSD was adopted as a data source for indicator 17.3.1 of the SDGs global indicator framework to measure development support.

The Commitment to Development Index is an alternative measure that ranks the largest donors on a broad range of their "development friendly" policies, including: the quality of aid (for instance by giving countries fewer points for tied aid), and considering country policies on issues such as trade, migration and international security.

== Society and culture ==
=== Global goals ===
Several of the Sustainable Development Goals (to be achieved by 2030 at a global level) include ODA in their targets and indicators. This applies to SDG 17 which is to "Strengthen the means of implementation and revitalize the Global Partnership for Sustainable Development". Its second target is worded as "Developed countries to implement fully their official development assistance commitments, including the commitment by many developed countries to achieve the target of 0.7 per cent of gross national income for official development assistance (ODA/GNI) to developing countries and 0.15 to 0.20 per cent of ODA/GNI to least developed countries; ODA providers are encouraged to consider setting a target to provide at least 0.20 per cent of ODA/GNI to least developed countries."

SDG 10 (Reduce inequality within and among countries) also includes a target on ODA: "Encourage official development assistance and financial flows, including foreign direct investment, to States where the need is greatest, in particular least developed countries, African countries, small island developing States and landlocked developing countries, in accordance with their national plans and programmes."

== See also ==
- Canadian foreign aid
- Poverty reduction
- Aid for Trade
