= Phantom aid =

Aid that never reaches its intended recipients

Phantom aid is what ActionAid describes as aid that never reaches the targeted recipients. This is mostly down to administration costs, as well as aid being used towards commercial ventures. The charity believes that half of all aid fails to reach the poor.

== See also ==
- Tied aid
- Phantom aid in Afghanistan
