= U.S.–Afghanistan Strategic Partnership Agreement =

Bilateral accords reached in 2014 between the US and allied Afghans on defense matters

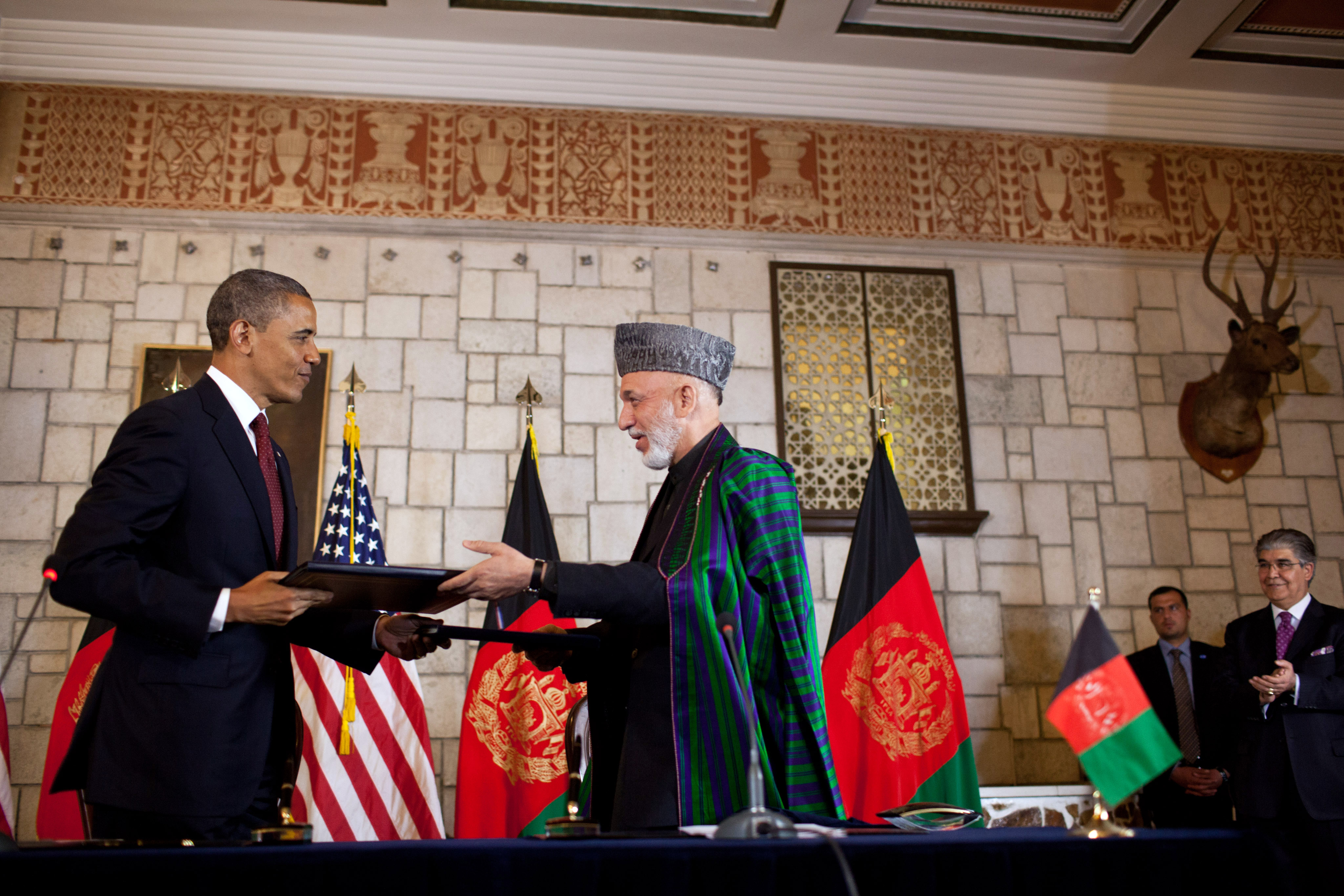
U.S. president Barack Obama and Afghan president Hamid Karzai exchange documents after signing the Enduring Strategic Partnership Agreement Between the United States of America and the Islamic Republic of Afghanistan at the Presidential Palace in Kabul on 2 May 2012.

The U.S.–Afghanistan Strategic Partnership Agreement (SASPA), officially titled Enduring Strategic Partnership Agreement between the Islamic Republic of Afghanistan and the United States of America, was an agreement between the former government of Afghanistan and the United States that provides the long-term framework for the relationship between Afghanistan and the United States after the drawdown of U.S. forces in the Afghanistan war. SASPA went into effect on 4 July 2012, as stated by U.S. secretary of state Hillary Clinton, who said on 8 July 2012, at the Tokyo Conference on Afghanistan: "Like a number of countries represented here, the United States and Afghanistan signed a Strategic Partnership Agreement that went into effect four days ago." SASPA was broadened by the Bilateral Security Agreement (BSA) that both countries were obliged to negotiate within one year, which resulted on 30 September 2014 in the "Security and defense cooperation agreement between the Islamic Republic of Afghanistan and the United States of America" (SADCA).

== Events leading up to SASPA ==
In March and April 2012, the United States and Afghanistan reached two agreements as part of setting the framework for U.S. involvement in Afghanistan after the end of Operation Enduring Freedom and the International Security Assistance Force in Afghanistan at the end of 2014.

The first, signed on 9 March 2012, provided for the transfer of control of the Parwan Detention Facility next to Bagram Airfield from the United States to Afghanistan. According to Al Jazeera the agreement "will put an Afghan general in charge of Parwan [...] within days, [...] but will also give a six-month window to gradually transfer detainees to Afghan oversight. According to the document, the U.S. will continue to provide logistical support for 12 months and a joint U.S.–Afghan commission will decide on any detainee releases until a more permanent pact is adopted." The memorandum of understanding also shifted the responsibility for all U.S. detention facilities in the country to Afghanistan.

The second, signed on 8 April 2012, transferred control of special operations to Afghan forces. Part of the agreement was to give Afghan military units greater control of controversial night raid operations unpopular with locals and to bring the raids under Afghan judicial authority, while U.S. troops shifted to a supporting role. The document was signed by Afghan General Abdul Rahim Wardak and U.S. General John Allen. "Today we are one step closer to the establishment of the U.S.–Afghan strategic partnership. Most importantly, today we are one step closer to our shared goal and vision of a secure and sovereign Afghanistan," Allen said at the deal's signing.

According to Al Jazeera the U.S.–Afghan strategic partnership "is expected to provide for several thousand U.S. troops to stay and train Afghan forces and help with counter-terrorism operations. It would outline the legal status of those forces, their operating rules and where they would be based." The Obama administration hoped to finalize the U.S.–Afghan strategic partnership before the 2012 NATO Summit in Chicago, but U.S. efforts to finalize this partnership after one year of talks between the Afghan and U.S. governments were complicated by incidents involving the U.S. such as the burning of copies of the Quran and the death of 17 Afghans in southern Afghanistan.

=== History ===
On 22 April 2012, after more than a year and a half of negotiations, Afghanistan and the United States finalized the draft text for SASPA for review before it became final after the Afghan and U.S. president signed it.

SASPA was to be in effect for at least 10 years, and laid out the framework for a future U.S. role in Afghanistan, including aid assistance and governance advice, and covered the areas of social and economic development, institution building, regional cooperation and security. U.S. help to support Afghan economic development, health care programs, education and social initiatives were part of the agreement. The status of U.S. troops and the details of their operations after the 2014 withdrawal of NATO forces was not included in SASPA, but shall be covered in a separate status of forces agreement. Long-term U.S. access to military bases in Afghanistan as well as the size or location of U.S. bases in Afghanistan were also not part of SASPA.

According to Afghan Foreign Minister, Zalmai Rassoul, there were not to be permanent U.S. bases in Afghanistan. He told the Afghan National Assembly that the United States as "not interested in having military bases in Afghanistan which might be seen as a threat to our neighbors", but Afghan National Security Advisor Rangin Dadfar Spanta said before the Afghan parliament "After signing the strategic pact, a separate security agreement which will allow or not allow the existence of U.S. permanent bases in Afghanistan will be signed after one year if agreed." SASPA draft text contained broad provisions for matters (such as economic development and security) which were of common concern for both countries, however, an unnamed U.S. official told Time magazine "specifics that go beyond the scope of the framework will need to be discussed and addressed in future memorandum of understanding, agreements or other arrangements as appropriate." Obstacles on the way to the agreement of the draft text were the issues of night raids conducted by U.S. troops and the operation of detention facilities by the United States. The New York Times reported in this context in April 2012: "In March the two sides signed a memorandum of understanding shifting responsibility for all detention facilities in the country to the Afghans, and earlier this month they handed final authority for night raids to Afghan security forces, who are now carrying out all raids unless American assistance is requested. With those two issues resolved, the strategic partnership was quickly completed."

=== Signing and content of agreement ===
On 1 May 2012, Afghan President Hamid Karzai and U.S. President Barack Obama signed SASPA, after Obama arrived in Afghanistan as part of unannounced trip on the first anniversary of Osama bin Laden's death to sign the agreement, to visit American troops and to address the American nation from Bagram Air Base about his plans to responsibly end the war. The White House released a fact sheet to the agreement which stated that the agreement is a legally binding executive agreement the purpose of which is "to cement an enduring partnership with Afghanistan that strengthens Afghan sovereignty, stability and prosperity, and that contributes to our shared goal of defeating Al Qaeda and its extremist affiliates". The agreement shall help to promote NATO training of Afghan forces, a reconciliation and reintegration process for Taliban fighters who leave the battlefield, and regional stability with a focus on improving relations with Pakistan. The duration of the agreement is 10 years and requires from both parties to replace the current status of forces agreement with a bilateral security arrangement to be negotiated within a year. Covered areas under the agreement are military and security issues as well as assistance in building Afghanistan's economy and its democracy. One of the provisions of the agreement is the designation of Afghanistan as a major non-NATO ally of the United States to provide a long-term framework for security and defense cooperation. Other provisions of the agreement are:

- The United States' commitment to support Afghanistan's social and economic development, security, institutions and regional cooperation for 10 years
- The commitment by Afghanistan to strengthen government accountability, transparency and oversight, and to protect the human rights of all Afghans, both men and women
- Access to and use of Afghan facilities by U.S. personnel beyond 2014
- Granting the United States the possibility of keeping forces in Afghanistan after 2014 for purposes of training Afghan forces and targeting al-Qaida
- Non-Commitment by the U.S. to any specific troop levels or funding levels in the future
- Commitment by the U.S. to seek funding from the U.S. Congress on an annual basis for social and economic assistance for Afghanistan as well as to support the Afghan National Security Forces (ANSF)

=== Reactions to the SASPA agreement ===
President Karzai said that the agreement "will close the season of the past 10 years and is going to open an equal relationship season. With the signing of this agreement, we are starting a phase between two sovereign and independent countries that will be based on mutual respect, mutual commitments and mutual friendship". During a background briefing on the strategic partnership agreement by senior administration officials aboard Air Force One en route to Afghanistan, an unnamed U.S. official said: "This agreement will make clear to the Taliban, to al Qaeda, and to other international terrorist groups that they cannot wait us out. The agreement is not only a signal of long-term commitment by the United States, but a document that enshrines commitments by both countries to each other with a common purpose. Our commitments to support Afghanistan's social and economic development, security, institutions and regional cooperation is matched by Afghan commitments to strengthen accountability, transparency, oversight, and to protect the human rights of all Afghans, men and women." Another U.S. official told The New York Times the agreement is necessary to give the United States the capacity to carry out counter-terrorism operations in order to prevent Al Qaeda's resettlement in Afghanistan and ensures "a regional equilibrium that serves our national security interest. And that's ultimately why we went in there in the first place."

According to The Christian Science Monitor, concerns have been raised about the agreement to end combat operations and withdraw troops earlier than previously planned, in particular regarding Afghanistan's security. The newspaper stated that anti-Afghanistan militants continue to carry out attacks on Western troops and that the Afghan military and police are not ready to assume responsibility for the country's security. Other concerns the Monitor noted include: a potential increase in illegal drug trafficking; negative impact on the economy and on social reforms, particularly those for women and destabilization of the country that could affect neighboring countries Pakistan and Iran. Concerns were also raised by Iran; following the announcement, a spokesman for Iran's foreign ministry stated that the agreement will lead to increased instability in Afghanistan due to the continued presence of U.S. forces. Investigative historian and journalist specializing in U.S. national security policy Gareth Porter said that neither the Strategic Partnership Agreement (SPA) nor the Memorandum of Understanding (MOU) regarding night raids will end the Afghanistan war nor the in Afghanistan unpopular night raids conducted by U.S. Special Operations Forces (SOF).

The agreement received criticism from Republican members of Congress including Buck McKeon and James Inhofe. McKeon argued that the agreement did not provide anything new, and Inhofe, a member of the Senate Armed Services Committee, called it "an attempt to shore up President Obama's national-security credentials". Conservatives including Inhofe and Heritage Foundation fellow James Carafano criticized the timing of the agreement and Obama's visit to Afghanistan, which they argue appears to have been related to his re-election campaign. However, they support the signing of the agreement to ensure the long-term presence of U.S. forces in the country as necessary for its stabilization.

== Designation of Afghanistan as major non-NATO ally ==
On 7 July 2012, as part of the Enduring Strategic Partnership Agreement, the United States designated Afghanistan a major non-NATO ally after U.S. Secretary of State Hillary Clinton arrived in Kabul to meet with President Karzai. "Please know that the United States will be your friend," Clinton told Karzai. "We are not even imagining abandoning Afghanistan. Quite the opposite. We are building a partnership with Afghanistan that will endure far into the future."

Afghanistan is the first country awarded the major non-NATO ally (MNNA) status by Barack Obama's administration. The change, which comes into effect immediately, makes it easier for Kabul to purchase U.S. military equipment and simplifies arms export procedures. Clinton said: "There are a number of benefits that accrue to countries that have this designation. ... They are able to have access to excess defense supplies, for example, and they can be part of certain kinds of training and capacity building." Some of the privileges of MNNA status include in addition eligibility for training, loans of equipment for cooperative research and development, and ultimately foreign military financing for commercial leasing of certain defense articles. "We see this as a powerful symbol of our commitment to Afghanistan's future," Clinton said at a press conference after talks with President Hamid Karzai. "This is the kind of relationship that we think will be especially beneficial as we do the transition." And she added: "It will open the door to Afghanistan's military to have a greater capability and a broader kind of relationship with the United States and especially the United States military." The Times of India described the MNNA status in this context as "a catalyst for maintaining effective Afghan National Security Forces and building a robust peace-time security relationship between Afghanistan and the U.S."

The designation by the United States grants a country special privileges, like access to American military training and excess military supplies, Clinton said. In a separate statement, the State Department said Afghanistan would also be able to obtain loans of equipment from the United States and financing for leasing equipment. The agreement does not, however, "entail any security commitment" by the United States to Afghanistan, the State Department said Designating Afghanistan an ally, however, has the potential to raise awkward issues for the United States. There is Afghanistan's hot-and-cold relationship with Pakistan, also an ally, and the possibility the two neighbors could have a falling-out, especially if Afghan officials believe in the years after 2014 that their Pakistani counterparts continue to aid the Taliban.

American and Afghan officials said after Afghanistan's designation as major non-NATO that they now must turn to working out, as mandated by the Strategic Partnership Agreement, a bilateral security arrangement that would keep a residual American force in Afghanistan to continue training Afghan National Security Forces and tracking down insurgents after 2014. Talks on the arrangement have not yet begun according to American officials. Estimates of the number of troops that could stay vary from as little as 10,000 to as many as 25,000 or 30,000. However, Clinton reiterated on 7 July 2012 that Washington did envision keeping American troops in Afghanistan, where they would provide the kind of air power and surveillance capabilities needed to give Afghan forces an edge over the Taliban.

== SADCA Bilateral Security Agreement ==
=== Events leading up to agreement on core elements ===
Under the strategic partnership agreement signed by the U.S. and Afghanistan in May 2012 both countries are obliged to negotiate a bilateral security agreement within one year. These negotiations were scheduled to begin on 15 November 2012. The talks will attempt to set conditions for U.S. forces in Afghanistan after 2014 as part of a "train, advise and assist" mission (U.S. President Obama and his national security team will determine the number of troops to be proposed) and are aimed at building a security framework, not a detailed agreement. Besides immunity from Afghan prosecution for U.S. soldiers accused of crimes and the Afghanistan demand that the U.S. guarantee that it will respond to any cross-border incursion or artillery attack on Afghanistan territory negotiators will attempt to set broad outlines for air rights over Afghanistan and the use and disposition of hundreds of U.S.-built bases—especially the huge air bases in Bagram and Kandahar. They may also discuss potential roles for U.S. Special Operations troops and unmanned drone aircraft, as well as the future of existing U.S. drone ground control stations in Afghanistan—subject to a final White House position on these issues. The details of these and other issues will be hammered out in "implementing documents" to be negotiated after any security agreement is signed.

The governments of the Islamic Republic of Afghanistan and the United States of America officially launched their negotiations on a Bilateral Security Agreement (BSA) on November 15, 2012, in Kabul. H.E. Eklil Hakimi, Ambassador of Afghanistan in Washington, was leading the Afghan negotiating team while Ambassador James Warlick, Deputy Special Representative for Afghanistan and Pakistan, was leading the United States negotiating team. Both sides affirmed that the key guiding principles in these important negotiations was full respect for Afghan sovereignty and Afghan national interests, including advancing the cause of peace and security across Afghanistan, strengthening the capacity and capabilities of Afghan national security forces so that they can independently provide security for the Afghan people and defend the country against external threats, and pursuing both countries' shared goal of eliminating trans-national terrorism. Both sides clarified that these negotiations are premised on the understanding that the United States does not seek permanent military bases in Afghanistan, or a presence that was perceived as a threat to Afghanistan's neighbors.

Plans by the U.S. to engage in peace talks with the Taliban have resulted in suspension of bilateral security discussions between the U.S. and Afghanistan on June 19, 2013. "In a special meeting chaired by President Hamid Karzai, the president has decided to suspend talks about a security pact with the U.S. because of their inconsistent statements and actions in regard to the peace process," spokesman Aimal Faizi told Reuters. Secretary of State John Kerry discussed the flare-up with Mr. Karzai in phone calls on 19 June 2013, Afghan and U.S. officials said, part of the latest round of crisis diplomacy between Washington and Afghanistan's mercurial leader. Negotiations on the Bilateral Security Agreement (BSA) began earlier 2013 and, if completed, will define the shape of the U.S. military presence in Afghanistan for years to come. The security discussions between the U.S. and Afghanistan would provide for a limited number of military trainers and counterterrorism forces to remain in the country. The talks have been complicated by several disagreements, including over the immunity that U.S. troops would enjoy from Afghan laws. Speaking to reporters days before the suspension, U.S. Marine Corps General Joseph Dunford, the commander of the U.S.-led coalition, said, "The bilateral security agreement is critical to any post-2014 presence. So it needs to be taken seriously on both sides." It was not clear how long Afghan President Karzai would withdraw from the security talks with the U.S., meant to finalize arrangements for keeping a small U.S. presence in the country after the last of the NATO troops leave 2014.

Talks between the United States and Afghanistan over the bilateral security agreement have faltered in recent months over the Afghan government's insistence that the United States guarantee Afghanistan's security and, in essence, commit to declaring Pakistan the main obstacle in the fight against militancy in the region. The guarantees sought by Afghanistan, if implemented, could possibly compel the United States to attack Taliban havens in Pakistan long after 2014, when the Obama administration has said it hoped to dial back the CIA's covert drone war there. President Karzai also wanted the Obama administration to specify the number of troops it would leave in Afghanistan after 2014 and make a multiyear financial commitment to the Afghan Army and the police.

The White House announced in June 2013 that long-delayed peace talks with the Taliban would begin in Doha, Qatar, where the Taliban opened what amounted to an embassy-in-exile, complete with their old flag and a plaque with their official name, "The Islamic Emirate of Afghanistan." But the highly choreographed announcement backfired, with Afghan officials saying the talks gave the insurgents undeserved legitimacy and accusing the Obama administration of negotiating behind Karzai's back. To the surprise of American officials, President Karzai then abruptly ended the negotiations over the bilateral security agreement. He has said the negotiations would not resume until the Taliban met directly with representatives of the Afghan government, essentially linking the security negotiations to a faltering peace process and making the United States responsible for persuading the Taliban to talk to the Afghan government.

=== Agreement on core elements ===
U.S. Secretary of State John Kerry and Afghan President Hamid Karzai announced on 12 October 2013, that they reached an agreement on a set of core elements of the bilateral security. Both however didn't reach an agreement on immunity from prosecution under Afghan law for American troops who remain in Afghanistan after 2014. This issue along with the entire agreement will be decided first by a traditional gathering of elders and other powerful people known as a loya jirga and then by the Afghan Parliament. The agreement provides a legal framework for continued U.S. military operations in Afghanistan, including the leasing of Afghan bases. Karzai said the draft framework agreement included his demands for the protection of Afghan sovereignty and rules on how military operations are to be carried out on Afghan territory. "Tonight we reached some sort of agreement," Karzai told reporters. U.S. forces "will no longer conduct operations by themselves. We have been provided written guarantee of the safety of the Afghan people. And a clear definition of 'invasion' was provided." "The one issue that is outstanding is the issue of jurisdiction," Kerry added. "We need to say that if the issue of jurisdiction cannot be resolved, unfortunately there cannot be a bilateral security agreement."

Neither Kerry nor Karzai provided details of what exactly had been agreed to, and it was not clear how they had forged a compromise on an Afghan demand that the United States guarantee Afghanistan's security as it would if the country were a NATO ally. That could compel the United States to send troops on raids into America's nuclear-armed power ally Pakistan. Afghan officials had said that demand was crucial to the country's sovereignty and must be met. The Obama administration had said it would not consider making any such guarantee. According to the BBC's David Loyn said President Karzai failed to win security guarantees so that Afghanistan would be protected by U.S. troops from external attack. Loyn added the U.S. will not grant that as it could mire them in a war with Pakistan. On the other main sticking point, the outlines of a compromise seemed clearer. Karzai had refused to allow American forces to hunt for operatives of Al Qaeda here on their own. Instead, he wanted any intelligence gathered by the United States handed over to Afghan forces, who could then conduct the raids. Karzai said on 12 October 2013, he had been assured that American forces would not conduct any unilateral operations in Afghanistan after 2014, leaving open the possibility that raids against Al Qaeda would be conducted jointly with Afghan forces.

=== Draft SADCA BSA ===
The United States and Afghanistan reached an agreement on the final language of the bilateral security agreement, which according to State Department spokeswoman Jen Psaki was not the final document and which U.S. officials were still reviewing it, on 20 November 2013. A letter written by U.S. President Obama said U.S. forces will be "cooperating in training, advising, and assisting" Afghan forces "in a targeted, smaller, counterterrorism mission." There is no limit on how long U.S. forces would remain in Afghanistan The accord also has no expiration date. The agreement says that "unless mutually agreed, United States forces shall not conduct combat operations in Afghanistan." It states the parties' "intention of protecting U.S. and Afghan national interests without U.S. military counter-terrorism operations" but does not specifically prohibit such operations. United States Special Operations forces will retain leeway to conduct antiterrorism raids on private Afghan homes American counterterrorism operations will be intended to "complement and support" Afghan missions and that U.S. forces will not conduct military operations in Afghanistan "unless mutually agreed" the text says. It underscores that Afghan forces will be in the lead and that any American military operations will be carried out "with full respect for Afghan sovereignty and full regard for the safety and security of the Afghan people, including in their homes." It also notes that "U.S. forces shall not target Afghan civilians, including in their homes, consistent with Afghan law and United States forces' rules of engagement." U.S. President Barack Obama wrote in a letter to his Afghan counterpart: "U.S. forces shall not enter Afghan homes for the purposes of military operations, except under extraordinary circumstances involving urgent risk to life and limb of U.S. nationals. We will continue to make every effort to respect the sanctity and dignity of Afghans in their homes and in their daily lives, just as we do for our own citizens."

The agreement does not spell out the number of U.S. forces who will remain, but Afghan President Karzai said on 21 November 2013, that he envisions up to 15,000 NATO troops being based in the country. According to several estimates, the United States plans to maintain a force of no more than 10,000 troops in Afghanistan after 2014. The draft agreement allows an indefinite U.S. presence, but Karzai said on 21 November 2013, it would be in place for 10 years. The agreement also includes language on the U.S. government's continued funding for Afghan security forces, funneling such contributions through the Kabul-based government.

The agreement text grants the United States full legal jurisdiction over U.S. troops and Defense Department civilians working in Afghanistan. On troop immunity, it says that Afghanistan agrees "that the United States shall have the exclusive right to exercise jurisdiction" over members of the force and its civilian component "in respect of any criminal or civil offenses committed in the territory of Afghanistan", and that "Afghanistan authorises the United States to hold [civil and criminal] trial in such cases, or take other disciplinary action, as appropriate, in the territory of Afghanistan", but Afghan authorities can ask that anyone be taken out of the country. Afghan authorities are prohibited from detaining American troops or U.S. civilians working with them. In the event that happens "for any reason," however, those personnel "shall be immediately handed over to United States forces authorities." The agreement also specifies that American troops and civilians cannot be surrendered to any "international tribunal or any other entity or state" without express U.S. consent. Afghanistan, it says, retains legal jurisdiction over civilian contractors, and contractors are prohibited from wearing military uniforms and "may only carry weapons in accordance with Afghan laws and regulations."

The document has a clause committing the United States to consulting with the Afghan government in the event of external threats, but not the sort of NATO-style mutual defense pact the Afghans originally wanted. "The United States shall regard with grave concern any external aggression or threat of external aggression against the sovereignty, independence, and territorial integrity of Afghanistan," the proposed agreement states. There is a later clause saying they would "consult urgently" in the event of such aggression. U.S. President Obama added in a letter to his Afghan counterpart: "The U.S. commitment to Afghanistan's independence, territorial integrity, and national unity, as enshrined in our Strategic Partnership Agreement, is enduring, as is our respect for Afghan sovereignty."

In a preamble, the draft specifies that "the United States does not seek permanent military facilities in Afghanistan, or a presence that is a threat to Afghanistan's neighbors, and has pledged not to use Afghan territory or facilities as a launching point for attacks on other countries." It says that "unless otherwise mutually agreed, United States forces shall not conduct combat operations in Afghanistan" and makes no promise of U.S. military support in the event of an attack or other security threat to Afghanistan. If there is such a threat, it says, the United States will regard it with "grave concern," consult and "shall urgently determine support it is prepared to provide." But the United States stated the U.S. will regard any external aggression with "grave concern" and will "strongly oppose" military threats or force against Afghanistan after 2014.

The draft agreement says that U.S. military and Defense Department civilian personnel are exempt from visa requirements and taxation. Afghan taxes and other fees will not be imposed on the entry or exit of goods specifically for the use of U.S. forces. An annex to the draft lists locations where Afghanistan agrees to provide facilities for U.S. forces, including Kabul; Bagram, north of the capital, where the United States has its largest current base; Mazar-e Sharif in northern Afghanistan; Herat in the west; Kandahar in the south; Shindand in Herat province; Sharab in Helmand province; Gardez, south of Kabul; and Jalalabad, to the east. The draft document gives the U.S. the right to deploy American forces on nine bases, including the two biggest, the airfields in Bagram and Kandahar. It also allows U.S. military planes to fly in and out of Afghanistan from seven air bases, including Kabul International Airport. U.S. forces would be permitted under the document to transport supplies from five border crossings, described along with the air bases as "official points of embarkation and debarkation." All bases in Afghanistan would revert to Afghan ownership and sovereignty after 2014, according to the draft.

=== Finalization of draft SADCA ===
The draft of the agreement was finalized early on 19 November 2013, after Obama wrote Karzai a letter assuring him that U.S. forces will continue to respect the "sanctity and dignity of the Afghan people." The agreement must as of 21 November 2013 be ratified by an Afghan grand council of elders and by ratified by the parliaments of Afghanistan and the United States. The agreement, according to the draft wording, takes effect 1 January 2015 and then "it shall remain in force until the end of 2024 and beyond" unless terminated with two years' advance notice. Afghan President Karzai said that the agreement would not be signed until after 2014 elections in Afghanistan, but U.S. officials have said unequivocally that the agreement must be signed by the end of the year 2013, if not sooner, to allow the Pentagon to prepare for its role after the American combat mission ends. White House Press Secretary Jay Carney said the agreement under consideration by the loya jirga is the Obama administration's "final offer." If not enacted by the end of the year, Carney said, it "would be impossible for the United States and our allies to plan for a presence post-2014." Karzai, who earlier stated he would sign what he had agreed to sign, stated later, after the announcement of the Bilatereal Security Agreement (BSA) draft text that, he would not sign it until 2014, after a presidential election to choose his successor, but before he leaves office. Aimal Faizi, a spokesman for Karzai, stated that Karzai wanted to wait until after the election in April 2014 to test further conditions: whether American forces would stop raids on Afghan homes, whether the Obama Administration will help stabilize security in Afghanistan, help promote peace talks and not interfere in the election. Officials of the Obama Administration consider the signing date to be nonnegotiable, citing the need for at least a year to plan future deployments and to allow coalition partners, including Germany and Italy, to plan for a residual troop presence that they have offered.

=== Approval of SADCA ===
The text of the BSA was approved by the delegates at the Loya Jirga on November 24, 2013, and must now be signed by the Afghanistan president, who rejected the final recommendation of the Loya Jirga to promptly sign the BSA with the United States, and sent to the parliament for final ratification. While the Afghanistan parliament endorsed the BSA in 2013, Afghan President Harmid Karzai refuses as of February 6, 2014 to sign i.e. approve the BSA. If approved, the agreement would allow the U.S. to deploy military advisors to train and equip Afghan security forces, along with U.S. special-operations troops for anti-terrorism missions against Al Qaeda and other terrorist groups. President Obama will determine the size of the force. The jirga set a few conditions before expressing approval for the agreement among them a 10-year time limit on the post-2014 troop presence and reparations for damages caused by U.S. troops deployed in Afghanistan. It also voted attach a letter of U.S. President Obama; pledging that U.S. troops would enter Afghan homes only in "extraordinary" circumstances and only if American lives were at direct risk, to the BSA. The elder assembly also demanded the release of 19 Afghans from the U.S. detention center at Guantanamo Bay and a stronger U.S. pledge to defend Afghanistan from any incursion from it neighbors, particularly Pakistan. The loya jirga also voted to request that the U.S. military add a base to the nine bases that would be occupied by U.S. troops under the proposed security pact after combat forces depart Afghanistan by the end of 2014. The base is in Bamian Province in central Afghanistan, where the NATO-led military coalition has maintained a presence. Bamian is a population center for Hazaras, a Shiite minority whose members were massacred by the Taliban prior to the U.S.-led invasion that toppled the militant group. Afghan analysts said Hazara delegates proposed the additional base. At least five of the 50 jirga committees raised objections to the article addressing "status of personnel" which "authorises the United States to hold [civil and criminal] trial ... or take other disciplinary action, as appropriate, in the territory of Afghanistan" when a U.S. soldier is accused of criminal activity. Spokespeople from at least two committees directly stated that Afghanistan should have jurisdiction over any U.S. soldiers accused of crimes on Afghan soil. Several committees also stated that if trials are held in the United States, families of victims should have access to and presence in U.S.-held trials at the expense of Washington.

As allied forces proceed to withdrawal troops, the international community wants to help and ensure that Afghanistan has security, political, and economic progress and to instill transparency and fairness of the elections. However, while the Afghanistan parliament endorsed the BSA in 2013, Afghan President Harmid Karzai refuses as of 6 February 2014, to sign i.e., approve the BSA. Presidential elections in Afghanistan are scheduled for April 2014 and the BSA is what is pending for the withdrawal of U.S. military and NATO forces. If it doesn't get signed and a civil war breaks out, the Taliban can easily regain their hold on the country, the most vulnerable citizens of the population, primarily women and children, stand to lose most. The possibility looms even greater if Karzai does not sign the BSA.

=== Signing of SADCA ===
The BSA was signed on 30 September 2014 for Afghanistan by Afghan national security adviser Mohammad Hanif and for the United States by U.S. Ambassador James B. Cunningham in a ceremony at the presidential palace in Kabul, Afghanistan. The BSA drove President Hamid Karzai from power because he refused to sign the agreement, and he was replaced in his post by his finance minister Ashraf Ghani one day earlier.

On that day a NATO Status of Forces Agreement was also signed, that gave forces from Allied and partner countries the legal protections necessary to carry out the NATO Resolute Support Mission when the International Security Assistance Force came to an end in 2014.

Under both agreements 9,800 U.S. and at least 2,000 NATO troops were allowed to remain in Afghanistan after the international combat mission formally ended on 31 December 2014 while also enabling the continued training and advising of Afghan security forces, as well as counterterrorism operations against remnants of al-Qaeda. Most of the troops helped train and assist the struggling Afghan security forces, although some U.S. Special Operations forces remained to conduct counterterrorism missions. The NATO-led ISAF mission transitioned to a training mission headquartered in Kabul with six bases around the country. Under the BSA, the United States was allowed to have bases at nine separate locations across Afghanistan:

- Kabul
- Bagram
- Mazar-e-Sharif
- Herat
- Kandahar
- Shorab (Helmand)
- Gardez
- Jalalabad
- Shindand

A base in Jalalabad, in eastern Afghanistan, could also remain a launching point for armed drone missions in Afghanistan and across the border in Pakistan. The agreement also prevents U.S. military personnel from being prosecuted under Afghan laws for any crimes they may commit; instead, the United States has jurisdiction over any criminal proceedings or disciplinary action involving its troops inside the country. The provision does not apply to civilian contractors. The 9,800 American troops are "expect[ed to] be cut in half by 2016", with American forces thereafter based only in Kabul and at Bagram air base. By the end of 2017, the U.S. force is to be further reduced in size to what U.S. officials have called a "normal" military advisory component at the U.S. Embassy in Kabul, most likely numbering several hundred.

=== Termination ===
The BSA went into force on 1 January 2015 and was said to remain in force "until the end of 2024 and beyond". However, the Trump administration terminated the agreement in February 2020 with the signing of the Doha Agreement (Agreement for Bringing Peace to Afghanistan between the Islamic Emirate of Afghanistan which is not recognized by the United States as a state and is known as the Taliban and the United States of America) with the Taliban, and the resulting withdrawal of U.S. troops from Afghanistan and concurrent 2021 Taliban offensive during the Biden administration.

== See also ==
- Afghanistan–United States relations
