= Commitment to Development Index =

Index by the Center for Global Development

The Commitment to Development Index (CDI), published annually by the Center for Global Development, ranks the world's richest countries on their dedication to policies that benefit the five billion people living in poorer nations. Rich and poor countries are linked in many ways; thus the Index looks beyond standard comparisons of foreign aid flows. It measures "development-friendliness" of 40 of the world's richest countries, all member nations of the OECD's Development Assistance Committee. The CDI assesses national effort in seven policy areas: aid, trade, investment, migration, environment, security, and technology. It is considered to be a numerical targeting indicator for Goal 8 of the Millennium Development Goals. It shows that aid is about more than quantity – quality also matters – and that development policy is about more than aid. The Index penalizes countries that give with one hand, for instance through aid or investment, but take away with the other, through trade barriers or pollution.

In 2021, the CDI ranked Sweden number one in the world, followed by France, Norway, Australia and the United Kingdom. Argentina, United Arab Emirates and India finished at the bottom.

== History ==
The CDI is a flagship initiative of the Center for Global Development (CGD), a non-profit think-tank based in Washington, DC. CGD first published the Index in Foreign Policy magazine in 2003 with the aim of provoking discussion, highlighting gaps in current knowledge, and encouraging policy reform. The Index was published annually in conjunction with Foreign Policy through 2006, and since published by CGD alone. David Roodman, Senior Fellow at the Center for Global Development, is the chief architect of the Index with research and support from key collaborators for technical work on components. Although the formulas and analysis at the heart of the CDI remain the same, slight methodological changes occur every year and indicators are constantly updated. The CDI originally ranked 21 countries; South Korea was added in 2008 and five additional European countries were added in 2012: Czech Republic, Hungary, Luxembourg, Poland, and Slovakia. They would add 13 more countries in the late 2010s. In 2008, regional CDIs were also published, assessing donor government policies and engagement to specific regions of the world such as sub-Saharan Africa and Latin America.

== Components ==
=== Aid ===
Foreign aid is the first component of the CDI, assessing both quantity as a percent of GDP and quality. The Index penalizes tied aid, which requires recipients to spend aid on products from the donor nation and raises project costs by 15 to 30 percent. Aid to poor, better-governed nations is also favored by the CDI. While aid to Equatorial Guinea—where corruption is more widespread and rule of law is weaker—is counted at 15¢ on the dollar, aid to Ghana—where poverty is high and governance relatively good—is counted at 94¢ on the dollar. Donors are penalized for overloading recipient governments with too many small aid projects, which burden recipient officials with hosting obligations and regular report filing. Finally, the Index rewards governments for letting taxpayers write off charitable contributions, since some of those contributions go to Oxfam, CARE, and other nonprofits working in developing countries.

=== Trade ===
International trade has been a force for economic development for centuries. Because rich-country players call most of the shots in this intensely political process, some goods that poor countries are best at producing, including crops, still face high barriers in rich countries. The trade component of the CDI penalizes countries for erecting barriers to imports of crops, clothing, and other goods from poor nations. It looks at two kinds of barriers: tariffs (taxes) on imports, and subsidies for domestic farmers, which stimulate overproduction and depress world prices.

=== Finance ===
Previously it was called the Investment. The CDI strives to reward rich countries that pursue policies that encourage investment and financial transparency that is good for development. It looks at two kinds of capital flows: foreign direct investment, which occurs when a company from one country buys a stake in an existing company or builds a factory in another country; and portfolio investment, which occurs when foreigners buy securities that are traded on open exchanges. The investment component is built on a checklist of twenty questions. Do the rich-country governments, for example, offer political risk insurance, encouraging companies to invest in poor countries whose political climate would otherwise be deemed too insecure? Do they have tax provisions or treaties to prevent overseas investors from being taxed both at home and in the investment country?

=== Migration ===
The CDI rewards migration of both skilled and unskilled people, though unskilled more so. It uses data on the gross inflow of migrants from developing countries in a recent year and the net increase in the number of unskilled migrant residents from developing countries during the 1990s. The CDI also uses indicators of openness to students from poor countries and aid for refugees and asylum seekers.

=== Environment ===
Rich countries use a disproportionate amount of scarce resources, and poor countries are most vulnerable to global warming and ecological deterioration. The environment component looks at what rich countries are doing to reduce their disproportionate use of the global commons. Countries do well if their greenhouse gas emissions are falling, if their gas taxes are high, if they do not subsidize the fishing industry, if they have a low fossil fuel rate per capita, and if they control imports of illegally cut tropical timber.

=== Security ===
The security component of the CDI compares rich countries on military actions that affect developing countries. The CDI looks at four aspects of the security-development nexus. It tallies the financial and personnel contributions to peacekeeping operations and forcible humanitarian interventions, although it counts only operations approved by an international body such as the U.N. Security Council or NATO. It also rewards countries that base naval fleets where they can secure sea lanes, and for participating in international security regimes that promote non-proliferation, disarmament and international rule of law—such as the Comprehensive Test Ban Treaty (CTBT), the Ottawa Convention on land mines, and the International Criminal Court (ICC). Finally, the CDI penalizes some exports of arms to nations, especially ones that are undemocratic and spend heavily on the military.

=== Technology ===
The technology component of the CDI analyses policies of the rich countries that support creation and dissemination of new technologies, which can profoundly shape life in developing countries. The CDI rewards policies that support the creation and dissemination of innovations of value to developing countries. It rewards government subsidies for research and development(R&D), whether delivered through spending or tax breaks, while discounting military R&D by half. Also factored in are policies on intellectual property rights (IPRs) that can inhibit the international flow of innovations. These take the form of patent laws that arguably go too far in advancing the interests of those who produce innovations at the expense of those who use them. U.S. trade negotiators, for example, have pushed for developing countries to agree never to force the immediate licensing of a patent even when it would serve a compelling public interest, as an HIV/AIDS drug might if produced by low-cost local manufacturers.

=== Health ===
The health component of the CDI was added in 2021 as a response to the COVID-19 pandemic. It initially was partially part of the measures for security under pandemic preparedness and antimicrobial resistance. They take into account how the country responded to the pandemic, and how successful they are at preventing it mostly due to vaccines. Other than that, they measure how in "peacetime" the risks a country would make to health like making a biological weapon that could threaten domestic borders.

== Methodology ==
The CDI ranks 40 countries which are the richest, most developed countries in the world. Together, they constitute the majority membership of the OECD's Development Assistance Committee which is the official organization of aid donors, along with one DAC observers (Hungary).

The CDI quantifies a range of rich-country policies in seven policy area. Scores on each component are scaled on a percentage so that an average score in 2021 equals 50%. A country's final score is the average of those for each component. The CDI adjusts for size in order to compare how well countries are living up to their potential to help. Data for the CDI come from official sources such as the World Bank, the Organisation for Economic Co-operation and Development, and the United Nations, or from academic researchers. CGD and its collaborators also collect information country by country for parts of the aid, migration and investment components. The 2012 technical paper and spreadsheet provide more detail.

== Latest rankings ==
Commitment to Development Index 2021
Rank	Country	Investment	Development Finance	Technology	Environment	Trade	Security	Migration	Health (Note: Added in 2021 due to COVID-19)	Overall (Average)
1	Sweden	86%	95%	40%	100%	92%	86%	100%	92%	100
2	France	100%	54%	69%	95%	80%	85%	39%	59%	78
3	Norway	70%	96%	58%	83%	31%	88%	66%	68%	75
4	Australia	67%	45%	100%	50%	97%	84%	37%	90%	74
5	United Kingdom	90%	82%	38%	86%	86%	100%	28%	56%	74
6	Netherlands	57%	80%	34%	86%	100%	86%	46%	82%	74
7	Germany	80%	66%	38%	84%	89%	79%	58%	72%	74
8	Finland	63%	67%	33%	73%	85%	90%	45%	100%	71
9	Canada	94%	56%	62%	49%	72%	77%	54%	85%	70
10	Denmark	57%	87%	36%	86%	83%	92%	31%	72%	69
11	Austria	63%	50%	62%	85%	79%	94%	46%	55%	67
12	Portugal	60%	52%	45%	94%	71%	89%	55%	60%	66
13	Switzerland	61%	63%	51%	82%	56%	75%	47%	81%	65
14	Luxembourg	39%	100%	83%	34%	70%	68%	57%	62%	62
15	New Zealand	54%	30%	70%	74%	94%	81%	55%	52%	62
16	Belgium	69%	74%	40%	71%	76%	71%	54%	57%	62
17	Japan	63%	48%	46%	77%	85%	69%	22%	92%	60
18	Ireland	72%	75%	22%	83%	56%	95%	36%	45%	57
19	Italy	81%	53%	22%	86%	74%	83%	45%	27%	54
20	Spain	78%	49%	18%	92%	80%	75%	42%	33%	53
21	Czech Republic	47%	45%	42%	81%	76%	85%	14%	55%	49
22	United States	47%	50%	30%	44%	82%	93%	36%	58%	46
23	Slovakia	43%	45%	18%	87%	60%	96%	4%	69%	44
24	South Korea	36%	42%	88%	76%	24%	59%	32%	54%	44
25	Hungary	42%	40%	27%	89%	58%	95%	10%	56%	44
26	Chile	40%	30%	15%	92%	81%	48%	81%	29%	42
27	Greece	59%	50%	11%	84%	45%	83%	61%	19%	42
28	South Africa	37%	51%	61%	61%	37%	84%	35%	25%	38
29	Turkey	17%	90%	10%	60%	12%	53%	98%	33%	34
30	Poland	33%	44%	11%	80%	52%	71%	9%	18%	22
31	Brazil	55%	42%	36%	80%	3%	58%	30%	0%	21
32	Saudi Arabia	5%	58%	56%	24%	42%	26%	8%	88%	19
33	Indonesia	24%	43%	30%	79%	14%	57%	0%	48%	19
34	Mexico	48%	28%	0%	78%	30%	51%	16%	38%	16
35	Israel	55%	0%	36%	59%	56%	1%	28%	37%	13
36	China	18%	3%	40%	79%	42%	38%	0%	41%	11
37	Russia	17%	40%	47%	55%	31%	24%	7%	38%	10
38	Argentina	17%	31%	32%	75%	4%	50%	20%	20%	9
39	United Arab Emirates	0%	73%	30%	0%	69%	0%	17%	61%	5
40	India	25%	3%	20%	90%	0%	25%	5%	13%	0

== Collaborators ==
CGD commissions background papers and research for most of the components. However, final design responsibility rests with CGD and the CDI does not necessarily represent the views of contributors.

- David Roodman, Senior Fellow, Center for Global Development (Chief Architect)
- Theodore Moran, Non-Resident Fellow, Center for Global Development (Investment)
- Kimberly Hamilton and Jeanne Batalova of the Migration Policy Institute (Migration)
- B. Lindsay Lowell and Victoria Carro of Georgetown University's Institute for the Study of International Migration (Migration)
- Amy Cassara and Daniel Prager of the World Resources Institute (Environment)
- Michael O'Hanlon and Adriana Lins de Albuquerque of the Brookings Institution (Security)
- Jason Alderwick and Mark Stoker, formerly of the International Institute for Strategic Studies (Security)
- Keith E. Maskus of the University of Colorado at Boulder and Walter Park of American University (Technology)

== Criticism ==
The Commitment to Development Index has received much media attention over the years and has sparked criticism and discussion among a wide range of audiences. One of the most frequent comments, voiced by the Japanese Ministry of Foreign Affairs, questions the selection of the seven components. The ministry argues that several categories may be extraneous when measuring contributions to poverty reduction. The equal weighting of components in the Index is also questioned; the CDI fails to take into account different degrees of impact, thus assuming that foreign aid and migration have equal effects on development. To continue the conversation, David Roodman responded in a blog post to such comments. Experts have also written papers on how to improve the CDI and proposed similar measures.
