= Sustainable Development Goals and Australia =

Set of 17 global development goals defined by the United Nations for the year 2030

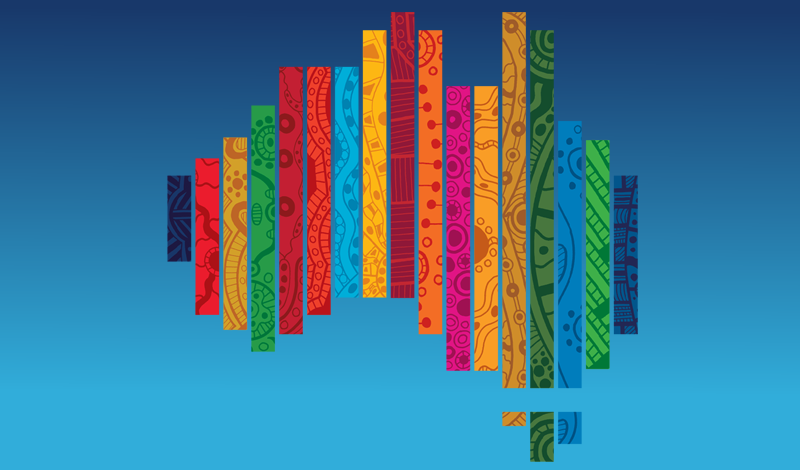
17 individual, yet interconnected, art strips symbolising each of the 17 interconnected Sustainable Development Goals in the shape of the Australian continent

The "Sustainable Development Goals and Australia" describe how Australia participates in the Sustainable Development Goals (SDGs) process. The SDGs are a collection of 17 global goals designed to be a "blueprint to achieve a better and more sustainable future for all". The SDGs, set in 2015 by the United Nations General Assembly and intended to be achieved by the year 2030, are part of a UN Resolution called "The 2030 Agenda". The targets and indicators for the SDGs are included in the UN Resolution adopted by the General Assembly two years later on 6 July 2017.

The Commonwealth of Australia was one of the 193 countries that adopted the 2030 Agenda in September 2015. Implementation of the agenda is led by the Department of Foreign Affairs and Trade (DFAT) and the Department of the Prime Minister and Cabinet (PM&C) with different federal government agencies responsible for each of the goals.

In November 2020, the Transforming Australia: SDG Progress Report stated that while Australia was performing well in health (SDG 3) and education (SDG 4) it was falling behind in the reduction of CO_{2} emissions (SDG 13), waste and environmental degradation (SDG 12, SDG 14 and SDG 15), and addressing economic inequality (SDG 10).

Australia is not on-track to achieve the SDGs by 2030. Four modelled scenarios based on different development approaches found that the 'Sustainability Transition' scenario could deliver "rapid and balanced progress of 70% towards SDG targets by 2020, well ahead of the business-as-usual scenario (40%)". In 2020, Australia's overall performance in the SDG Index is ranked 37th out of 166 countries (down from 18th out of 34 countries in 2015).

== Background ==
The 17 Sustainable Development Goals

=== Role in the SDGs creation ===
The Department of Foreign Affairs and Trade (DFAT) led Australia's contribution to the development of the 2030 Agenda, which comprises the SDGs and the Addis Ababa Action Agenda. In its 2015-2016 Annual Report, DFAT said its actions successfully ensured that Australia's national interest and existing aid, trade and foreign policy priorities, and those of its development partners, were reflected in the outcome. DFAT was active in securing standalone SDGs for economic growth (SDG 8), gender equality (SDG 5) and peace and good governance (SDG 16). In doing so, helps strengthen "existing international frameworks, such as the Convention on the Elimination of all Forms of Discrimination Against Women".

=== National co-ordination and governance ===
To co-ordinate Australia's domestic and international efforts to advance the 2030 Agenda, the Australian Government formed an Interdepartmental Committee (IDC) of senior officials. Co-chaired by PM&C and the DFAT, the committee collaborates with domestic stakeholders to promote and monitor Australia's progress.

Responsibility for each goal is allocated to an Australian Government agency and each department is responsible for making the latest available data on the SDG data platform.

Government agencies for domestic reporting on the Sustainable Development Goals for the Voluntary National Review
Goal	Lead Agency	Supporting agencies
SDG 1	Social Services	PM&C; Australian Bureau of Statistics; Home Affairs (EMA)
SDG 2	Agriculture and Water Resources	Health
SDG 3	Health	-
SDG 4	Education and Training	-
SDG 5	PM&C	DSS
SDG 6	Agriculture and Water Resources	Environment and Energy
SDG 7	Environment and Energy	Industry, Innovation and Science
SDG 8	Treasury	Jobs and Small Business, ABS
SDG 9	Infrastructure, Regional Development and Cities	Industry, Innovation and Science; Communications and the Arts
SDG 10	Treasury	Social Services; Home Affairs
SDG 11	Infrastructure, Regional Development and Cities	Communications and the Arts; Home Affairs (EMA)
SDG 12	Environment and Energy	Agriculture and Water Resources; Finance
SDG 13	Environment and Energy	Home Affairs (EMA)
SDG 14	Environment and Energy	Agriculture and Water Resources; Home Affairs (Maritime Border Command); Infrastructure Regional Development and Cities (Australian Maritime Safety Authority)
SDG 15	Environment and Energy	Agriculture and Water Resources
SDG 16	Attorney-General's Department	Defence
SDG 17	DFAT	Treasury; AB

== Reporting platforms ==
=== National Government's Data Reporting Platform on the SDG indicators ===
In June 2018, the Australian Government launched a data platform to centralise its available datasets on SDG Indicators and provide a single point of access for anyone interested in SDG data.

The platform was part of a comprehensive package of reporting on SDG progress that included the VNR and the Australian SDGs website.

In addition to providing the status of Australia's data collection against all 232 SDG indicators, as progress is made over time on identifying data-sets or the SDG indicators are refined, other datasets can be uploaded to the platform. It will also assist with streamlining SDG reporting for other purposes as it can interact with other reporting instruments like the Sendai Framework.

The "data community" was interested in seeing what actions the Australian Government has taken to plug existing data gaps to monitor progress on the SDGs. The launch of a new platform for SDG data, in addition to the VNR, was very welcome. The platform provides an incentive to improve its ability to report and by taking on this task in 'its own right', Australia "is best able to support neighbouring countries to meet their own data challenges".

=== National SDGs Website ===
In June 2018, the Global Compact Network Australia (GNCA) launched a website that allowed organisations to share their SDG aligned projects and activities in one location.

The Australian SDGs website was part of a comprehensive package of reporting on SDG progress to the that included the VNR and the Australian Government's Data Reporting Platform on the SDGs Indicators.

With the support of the Department of Foreign Affairs and Trade (DFAT), the site was developed in response to industry and key stakeholders keen to have a centralised platform where knowledge and examples of action could be shared openly. Any organisation can upload a SDG action or case-study and interact with others on the website. The platform includes a resources section, a news and events feature, additional information on what the SDGs are and their contact within the Australian market.

Before the Australian SDGs website, the GCNA had established an online Australian SDGs Hub for Business. The Hub explained the relevance of each of the 17 SDGs to Australian business practices, and suggests ways that companies could contribute to achieving the SDGs.

== Performance ==
=== Voluntary National Reviews ===
==== Voluntary National Review in 2018 ====
In July 2018, the Australian Government released its first Voluntary National Review (VNR) of its SDG implementation to the UN High Level Political Forum on Sustainable Development (HLPF). The VNR was part of a comprehensive package of reporting on SDG progress in that included the Australian Government's Data Reporting Platform on the SDGs Indicators and the Australian SDGs website.

In the review's foreword, the Australian Prime Minister, Malcolm Turnbull said: "At the heart of the Goals is the belief in ‘a fair go for all’— nothing could be more Australian."

Australia chose to take a narrative, case-study style approach to show the SDGs are a part of government policy and services delivery, and its broad support in the Australian community.

On the SDGs Knowledge platform, Australia listed six key messages from its review.

1. The SDGs reflect Australia’s values and belief in a ‘fair go’.
2. This is a ‘whole of Australia’ endeavour, across the whole Agenda.
3. Australia is committed to the 2030 Agenda.
4. Australia's response to the SDGs is shaped by the environment, governance systems, institutions, economy and society.
5. The SDGs contain long-standing, complex policy challenges with no simple solutions. They require a joint effort.
6. Australia has substantial expertise, innovation and experience to share.

At the domestic launch of the review, the Australian Minister for Foreign Affairs Julie Bishop highlighted four SDGs of particular importance to Australia: SDG 5 (gender equality), SDG 8 (decent work and economic growth), SDG 14 (life below water) and SDG 16 (peace, justice and strong institutions).

=== SDG Progress Reports ===
In November 2020, the Transforming Australia: SDG Progress Report stated that while Australia was performing well in health (SDG 3) and education (SDG 4) it was falling behind in the reduction of CO_{2} emissions (SDG 13), waste and environmental degradation (SDG 12, SDG 14 and SDG15), and addressing economic inequality (SDG 10).

Of the 56 SDG indicators applied in the report, 12 were considered on track to meet the 2030 targets, 23 were determined to be off track, 11 required a breakthrough and 10 need to improve.

The 2020 report built on the targets and measures of progress developed in 2018, where that report scored Australia's overall performance at 6.5 out of 10 - an average of Australia's performance across all 17 goals.

=== SDG Index ===
In 2020, Australia's overall performance in the SDG Index is ranked 37th out of 166 countries (down from 18th out of 34 countries in 2015).

Australia's SDG Index ratings (2015 - 2020)
Year	Ranking / No. of countries	Score	Reference
2015	Equal 18th /34	6.65 / 10	
2016	20/ 149	74.5 / 100	
2017	26 / 157	75.9 / 100	
2018	37 /156	72.9 / 100	
2019	38 / 162	73.9 / 100	
2020	37 / 166	74.9 / 100	

Assessment in 2020 - SDG Dashboard
SDG	Status	SDG Trends
SDG 1	Challenges remain	Moderately improving
SDG 2	Major challenges	Moderately improving
SDG 3	Achieved	On track and maintaining SDG achievement
SDG 4	Challenges remain	Moderately improving
SDG 5	Significant challenges	On track and maintaining SDG achievement
SDG 6	Challenges remain	Moderately improving
SDG 7	Major challenges	Moderately improving
SDG 8	Significant challenges	On track and maintaining SDG achievement
SDG 9	Significant challenges	Moderately improving
SDG 10	Significant challenges	Stagnating
SDG 11	Challenges remain	Stagnating
SDG 12	Major challenges	Information unavailable
SDG 13	Major challenges	Stagnating
SDG 14	Significant challenges	Stagnating
SDG 15	Significant challenges	Stagnating
SDG 16	Challenges remain	Moderately improving
SDG 17	Significant challenges	Stagnating

=== Reviews by academics ===
Australia is not on-track to achieve the SDGs by 2030. Four modelled scenarios based on different development approaches found that the 'Sustainability Transition' scenario could deliver "rapid and balanced progress of 70% towards SDG targets by 2020, well ahead of the business-as-usual scenario (40%)".

=== Private sector ===
A review of corporate sustainability reports from the top 150 Australian public-listed companies (ASX150) has found that while reporting on the SDGs is rising the quality of disclosure is lacking. The RMIT University/United Nations Association of Australia report found 48% of companies mentioned the SDGs. While 45% of companies disclosed how they were prioritising selected SDGs, "very few companies link business goals and targets with the SDGs which makes assessing real progress towards achieving them difficult to determine".

== Challenges ==
Australian flag

=== Senate inquiry and recommendations ===
In December 2017, The Australian Senate referred the SDGs to its Foreign Affairs, Defence and References Committee for a Senate Inquiry. Five public hearings were held and 164 written submissions were reviewed. A majority of the submissions focused on best practice. The Committee released its report, with 18 recommendations, in February 2019. The report made a number of recommendations to strengthen SDG co-ordination and governance by establishing a national SDG secretariat to provide the IDC more support (Recommendation 4), the IDC regularly share resources on international best practice across government (Recommendation 7), undertakes a SDG literate review annually and updates links to its information resources and partners with stakeholders to develop and disseminate Australian information resources (Recommendation 8).

Among the Committee recommendations are a national SDG implementation plan, the formation of a cross-sector consultation group to advise the Government's IDC on the SDGs and regular mandatory reporting of the country's performance against the goals.

The Senate report included a dissenting report from Coalition Senators, concerned that many of the recommendations would create unnecessary bureaucracy, regulation and expense for no benefit. The Government's decision to mainstream the SDGs across its agencies and the create of inter-departmental committee from the very beginning, had already put in place the foundations needed to purse the goals. On this basis, the dissenting Senators "encouraged the Government to ignore the recommendations of the majority report".

The committee's first recommendation is the publication of a national SDG implementation plan that "includes national priorities and regular reports of Australia's performance against the goals". More than a year after this recommendation was made, "the government is yet to release such a plan or indicate when such a roadmap will be presented". As of June 2020, none of these recommendations have been implemented by the Government.

==== Reception ====
In 2018, the Australian Council For International Development (ACFID) CEO, Marc Purcell, gave Australia a 'good effort, but must try harder' mark for self-assessing its progress against international bench-marks. The Australian Government recognised shortcomings and championed good practice and it acknowledged the goals as 'the' blue print for a 'whole of Australia' collective response to shared global challenges. "With such goodwill and understanding", Marc Purcell asks, "why is Australia falling behind?".

SDSN Australia, New Zealand & Pacific said the VNR was a significant step in Australia's affirmation in its commitment to the SDGs, however to meet the 2030 targets more urgency is required to move beyond “business as usual”.

== Society and culture ==
=== Higher education ===
A number of Australian universities have established leading faculties and institutes with clear links to the SDG agenda.

In the Times Higher Education’s second annual Impact Rankings, which ranks institutions contributions to the planet’s economic and social well-being, four Australian universities rank in the top 10 (University of Sydney, Western Sydney University, La Trobe University, RMIT University), eight in the top 50 and 15 in the top 100. It is the only global performance table that assess universities against the SDGs.

=== COVID-19 pandemic response ===
A group of Australian businesses, industry groups, universities and civil society organisations has called on the Australian Government to use the SDGs as a framework for Australia's recovery from the economic impacts of the COVID-19 pandemic. In a letter to the Australian Prime Minister, 52 organisations said the SDGs outline a path to 2030 that leaves no one behind and asked the Government to consider "building on the achievements that Australia has made against the United Nations Sustainability Development Goals".

The Transforming Australia: SDG Progress Report - Update 2020 included an evaluation of the effects of COVID-19 on Australia's capacity to achieve the SDGs. It reported that trends emerging before the pandemic - higher levels of unemployment, poverty and psychological distress - have been amplified and "could fracture Australian society".

== See also ==
- Addis Ababa Action Agenda
- Climate change in Australia
