= Fit-For-Purpose Land Administration =

Approach to land administration systems

Fit-For-Purpose Land Administration (FFPLA) is a pragmatic, flexible, and participatory approach to building and maintaining land administration systems. Designed to rapidly and affordably record land tenure rights—particularly in developing countries where it is sometimes reported that up to 70 percent of land remains outside formal land registration systems, dubbed the "zombie myth", rather than a better estimate that up to 70 percent of the world’s population lacks land tenure security. FFPLA prioritizes meeting the immediate societal needs for secure tenure over achieving high-precision geodetic survey standards.

== History and origins ==
The foundational concepts of FFPLA emerged between 2004 and 2014 in response to the failure of traditional Western-style cadastral systems to scale across developing nations. Traditional land titling programs often required costly, time-consuming field surveys and rigid legal procedures that excluded poor and rural populations. They also ignored customary rights. Development assistance land registration projects have often tried to template Western approaches to land registration, including over-engineered cadastral surveying and mapping with limited success.

The term "Fit-For-Purpose" in the context of land administration seems to have been first coined at the 2010 Annual World Bank Conference on Land Policy and Administration, in April 2010. In 2014, the International Federation of Surveyors (FIG) and the World Bank jointly published the landmark declaration, "Fit-For-Purpose Land Administration" (FIG Publication No. 60), authored by Stig Enemark, Keith Clifford Bell, Christiaan Lemmen, and Robin McLaren. In 2016, the Global Land Tool Network (GLTN) of the United Nations Human Settlements Programme (UN-Habitat), and Kadaster published the comprehensive operational guide, "Fit-For-Purpose Land Administration: Guiding Principles for Country Implementation" which was authored by Enemark, et al. These guidelines have reported that FFPLA "has emerged as a game changer and offers a practical solution to provide security of tenure and to control the use of land".

FIG Publication No. 60 was initially launched on 28 March 2014 in Washington, D.C., during the joint FIG/World Bank Spatial Innovation and Good Practices in Land Administration Forum, in Washington DC, which followed the Annual World Bank Conference on Land and Poverty. The FIG-World Bank Declaration on Fit-For-Purpose Land Administration was declared at this Forum and was included within FIG Publication No. 60. The Forum was organised by Bell and featured Enemark, then FIG President CheeHai Teo and also Malcolm Childress and Klaus Deininger from the World Bank.

On 18 June 2014 at the XXV FIG International Congress in Kuala Lumpur, Malaysia, FIG Publication No. 60 was launched to the broader, global professional community of FIG, during a dedicated joint session titled FIG/World Bank: Fit-for-Purpose/Pro-Poor Land Management. This session was chaired by McLaren, with Lemmen serving as rapporteur. All of the four co-authors presented, with Enemark leading. FFPLA was also formally noted in the minutes of the FIG General Assembly 2014.

The FIG–World Bank Declaration on Fit-for-Purpose Land Administration, issued in March 2014 as part of FIG Publication No. 60, called for replacing rigid, high-cost Western surveying standards with pragmatic, scalable land systems in developing countries. The declaration urges developing nations to treat high-precision, Western-style cadastral systems as a long-term objective rather than an immediate starting point, advocating instead for pragmatic systems that record how land is actually occupied and used. It outlines seven defining elements for fit-for-purpose land administration—requiring systems to be flexible, inclusive, participatory, affordable, reliable, attainable, and upgradeable—and calls for legal and institutional reforms to secure tenure rapidly in support of economic growth, social equity, and environmental sustainability.

== Core frameworks ==
FFPLA is structured around three interrelated core frameworks that work together to deliver secure tenure at scale:

1. The Spatial Framework: Focuses on mapping the way land is actually occupied and used rather than requiring high-accuracy boundary coordinates. It relies on visible boundaries identified on high-resolution satellite or aerial imagery through participatory community mapping, allowing accuracy to be incrementally upgraded over time as needs and resources grow.

2. The Legal Framework: Advocates for a flexible legal and regulatory structure that recognizes a continuum of land rights—including customary, informal, group, and statutory tenure—rather than forcing all land into individual freehold ownership.

3. The Institutional Framework: Promotes transparent, inclusive, and decentralized governance. It emphasizes strong political will, streamlined administrative processes, public-private partnerships, and accessible local land institutions to ensure long-term sustainability.

== Guiding principles ==
The three FFPLA frameworks have been operationaled into twelve guiding principles:

Spatial framework

- General boundaries rather than fixed boundaries: Identifies land parcels using visible physical features—such as hedges, walls, or streams—rather than installing high-precision boundary monuments.
- Aerial and satellite imagery rather than field surveys: Uses high-resolution imagery for participatory community mapping instead of conventional ground surveying.
- Accuracy relates to purpose rather than technical standards: Aligns spatial precision with local economic and social needs, reserving high-precision surveys for high-value urban areas.
- Opportunities for updating and incremental upgrading: Prioritizes rapid nationwide coverage initially, allowing boundary accuracy and parcel records to be upgraded over time.

Legal and regulatory framework

- Administrative rather than judicial processes: Manages routine land recording and initial dispute resolution through local administrative bodies rather than formal court proceedings.
- A continuum of tenure rather than just freehold: Recognizes a spectrum of legitimate land rights—including customary, communal, informal, and leasehold tenure—alongside individual freehold ownership.
- Flexible recordation rather than a single rigid register: Accommodates diverse tenure types within adaptable digital repositories, such as the Social Tenure Domain Model (STDM).
- Gender equity for land rights: Incorporates legal provisions and registration procedures that explicitly protect women's land tenure and co-ownership rights.

Institutional framework

- Good land governance over bureaucratic barriers: Streamlines administrative workflows and trains local land officers to operate as accessible community intermediaries.
- Integrated institutions rather than sectorial silos: Coordinates land tenure, valuation, land-use planning, and development across government agencies under a unified policy framework.
- Flexible ICT over high-end technology: Deploys scalable, low-cost, and open-source software tools suited to local technical capacity and infrastructure.
- Transparent, accessible land information: Maintains public access to land records at low cost to minimize corruption and prevent boundary disputes.

== Relationship with LADM (ISO 19152) ==
FFPLA is frequently paired with the Land Administration Domain Model (LADM, ISO 19152), published in 2012.While LADM provides the standardized conceptual data schema for modeling parties, rights/restrictions/responsibilities (RRRs), and spatial units, FFPLA provides the operational and policy methodology for collecting and maintaining that data affordably. LADM is not derived from FFPLA; rather, LADM's flexible design directly enables FFPLA implementations. Furthermore, the Social Tenure Domain Model (STDM) — a specialization of LADM developed by GLTN — serves as a practical open-source software tool built specifically to operationalize FFPLA principles in informal and customary contexts.

== Notable country implementations ==
The operational methods of FFPLA evolved from pre-2014 systematic registration and post-disaster recovery programs, subsequently scaling across national initiatives in Asia–Pacific, Latin America, and Sub-Saharan Africa.

=== Precursor and foundational programs (pre-2014) ===
- Indonesia (RALAS): The post-tsunami Reconstruction of Aceh Land Administration System (2005–2010) pioneered community-driven adjudication and participatory mapping with World Bank support, laying the groundwork for Indonesia's later Complete Systematic Land Registration (PTSL) program.
- Mekong Region and Philippines: Early World Bank–backed initiatives in Thailand, Vietnam (VLAP), Cambodia, Laos, and the Philippines (LAMP I & II) tested field-based community adjudication and ortho-mapping.
- Rwanda: Between 2009 and 2013, Rwanda registered over 10.3 million parcels using aerial orthophotos and local para-surveyors at low cost.

=== Subsequent FFPLA-aligned programs ===
- Post-disaster tenure recovery: Rapid spatial mapping and community verification were deployed following disasters such as the 2010 Haiti earthquake, Typhoon Haiyan in the Philippines (2013), and the 2015 Nepal earthquakes.
- Ethiopia, Benin, Namibia, and Uganda: Countries utilized low-cost certification, satellite imagery, participatory mapping, and the Social Tenure Domain Model (STDM) via UN-Habitat and the Global Land Tool Network (GLTN) to scale customary and rural tenure documentation.

== Alignment with the UN Sustainable Development Goals ==
Fit-For-Purpose Land Administration (FFPLA) serves as a key framework for achieving the United Nations Sustainable Development Goals (SDGs) by making tenure recording faster and more affordable. It directly addresses multiple SDG targets:

- SDG 1 (No Poverty): Expands documented tenure rights (Target 1.4, Indicator 1.4.2).
- SDG 2 (Zero Hunger): Secures smallholder agricultural rights to encourage productivity (Target 2.3).
- SDG 5 (Gender Equality): Promotes women's land and co-tenure rights through participatory mapping (Target 5.a, Indicators 5.a.1 and 5.a.2).
- SDG 11 (Sustainable Cities and Communities): Uses rapid mapping for informal settlement upgrading (Targets 11.1, 11.3).
- SDG 13 (Climate Action) & SDG 15 (Life on Land): Clarifies boundaries for natural resource management and land degradation neutrality (Target 15.3).
- SDG 16 (Peace, Justice and Strong Institutions): Reduces land disputes and builds transparent local registries (Targets 16.3, 16.6).

Co-custodians like UN-Habitat and its GLTN integrate FFPLA approaches—such as the Social Tenure Domain Model—into global monitoring, complementing the UN-GGIM's *Framework for Effective Land Administration* (2020).
