= Truphena Muthoni =

Kenyan environmental conservatist

Truphena Mūthoni
- Born: 2003 or 2004 (age 22–23); Mathira Constituency, Nyeri County, Kenya
- Citizenship: Kenya
- Known for: Guinness World Record holder Green activism Environmental advocacy Climate action Mental health Disability Inclusion
- Awards: Guinness World Record for tree hugging marathon for 48hrs, 72hrs

Truphena Mūthoni is a Kenyan environmental conservationist, climate, sustainability and mental health advocate. She is a Guinness World Record holder for the longest marathon hugging a tree. She first set the record at 48 hours in Michuki Memorial Park, Nairobi, between January 31 and February 2, 2025. On January 26, 2026, Guinness World Records officially ratified her new record of 72 hours, achieved in Nyeri County between December 8 and 11, 2025, where she surpassed her own previous benchmark to advocate for indigenous tree protection. The record-breaking moment was witnessed by Kenya’s Permanent Representative to the United Nations Environment Programme, Ababu Namwamba, among supporters, friends and relatives. On 12 December 2025, Mūthoni challenged her previous record by the 72hour tree hugging marathon in Nyeri at the governor's office compound, enduring hunger, fatigue, and very harsh weather. Mūthoni is a defender of forests, indigenous trees, people and animals. The tree hugging is a form of peaceful protest to urge leaders to respond to pertinent environmental issues

Mūthoni was scheduled to attend the 2025 United Nations Climate Change Conference (COP 30) in Brazil from 10-21November 2025 on climate action and the struggles of indigenous peoples, but did not get the required accreditation, badge, and funding from the Ministry of Environment, Climate change, and Forestry. The setback inspired her to continue with the 72-hour tree hugging in Kenya.

== Climate change, nature, and mental health ==
Mūthoni says that hugging trees is therapeutic and can bring happiness and relief for those struggling with mental health especially because mental health issues and climate injustices are linked to environmental degradation. Victims of climate change and those affected by wildfires, floods, and drought experience post-traumatic stress and reconnecting with nature can bring healing. She is a defender of indigenous trees and advocates that people love nature, treat it with care, and plant indigenous trees as mitigation rather than replacing them with saplings.

Mūthoni's clothing and style is symbolic. She had 17 strands of braided hair made from recycled yarn strands, representing the 17 Sustainable Development Goals. The braids had four distinct colours; Black symbolizing African power, protest and resilience; Green for regeneration, reforestation, and hope; Red for Indigenous resistance and frontline courage; and Blue for honoring water protectors and ocean defenders. Mūthoni wore a blindfold for several hours during the 72-hour marathon to raise awareness about those living with disabilities, and their vulnerability to the effects of climate change. Her efforts are focused on raising awareness about nature’s healing potential, particularly in addressing the growing prevalence of climate-related post-traumatic stress disorders. Mūthoni believes in the restorative power of nature and stresses the critical importance of preserving it for future generations.

== Education and advocacy ==
Truphena Mūthoni was born and raised in Mathìra Sub-county in Nyeri county, Kenya. She attended Parklands Baptist primary school and Narumouru Girls High School. She was an active scout rover. At the 2025 Founders Day Celebration in Nyeri, Mūthoni credited her Scouting background for instilling in her the values of perseverance, leadership, and a deep sense of responsibility toward creating a sustainable world. She reflected on how Scouting camps and programs have moulded her character, teaching her the importance of taking action for a better planet. In December 2025, following her record-breaking 72-hour tree-hugging marathon in Nyeri, Muthoni was awarded a full academic scholarship by the Mount Kenya University (MKU) Foundation. The scholarship allows her to pursue a degree in Environmental Studies starting in January 2026, aimed at backing her symbolic activism with professional expertise in climate science and forest conservation.

In her commitment to environmental conservation, peacebuilding, and community service, Muthoni has played significant roles:

- Crusader at Kisumu Environmental Champions
- Messenger of Peace, One Man Peace Campaign
- Brand Ambassador, Rotaract Club of Eco Warriors
- Assistant Commander, Wings over Wilson Air Scout Open Troop
- Rover Scout, Kenya Scout Association
- Representative, Youth For Kenya
