= Sustainable Development Goal 10 =

UN Sustainable Development Goal

- Mission statement: "Reduce inequality within and among countries"
- Commercial?: No
- Type of project: Non-Profit
- Location: Global
- Founder: United Nations
- Established: 2015
- Website: sdgs.un.org

Sustainable Development Goal 10 (Goal 10 or SDG 10) is about reduced inequality and is one of the 17 Sustainable Development Goals established by the United Nations in 2015. The full title is: "Reduce inequality within and among countries".

The Goal has ten targets to be achieved by 2019. Progress towards targets will be measured by indicators. The first seven targets are outcome targets: Reduce income inequalities; promote universal social, economic and political inclusion; ensure equal opportunities and end discrimination; adopt fiscal and social policies that promotes equality; improved regulation of global financial markets and institutions; enhanced representation for developing countries in financial institutions; responsible and well-managed migration policies. The other three targets are means of implementation targets: Special and differential treatment for developing countries; encourage development assistance and investment in least developed countries; reduce transaction costs for migrant remittances.

Target 10.1 is to "sustain income growth of the bottom 40 per cent of the population at a rate higher than the national average". This goal, known as "shared prosperity", is complementing SDG 1, the eradication of extreme poverty, and it is relevant for all countries in the world. There has been a growth in income for poorer people in 2012–2017. Nevertheless, it is common in many countries that "the bottom 40 per cent of the population receive less than 25 per cent of the overall income".

A UN report from 2020 pointed out that "women are more likely to be victims of discrimination than men". And the situation is even worse for women with disabilities.

== Background ==
Inequality exist in various forms, such as economic, sex, disability, race, social inequality, and different forms of discrimination. Measuring inequality in its individual forms is a crucial component in order to reduce inequality within and among countries. The Gini coefficient is the most frequently used measurement of socioeconomic inequality as it can significantly show the income and wealth distribution within and among countries.

Issues associated with health, pollution, and environmental justices are often inseparable with inequality. Sometimes these issues also associated with indigenous and aboriginal communities, ethnic minorities and communities of low socio-economic status (SES). Studies of environmental justice shows these communities are irregularly likely to live in environments with higher risk of exposure to pollution and toxic contamination, which possess long-term health and environmental threats.

Globalization is also accompanied with migration, displacement and dispossession, and this often increased vulnerability of marginalized communities and groups, which negatively shaped their prospects for globalization and emancipation and widened inequality at the meantime. There are also association between inequality and mental and physical health in various forms, such as status anxiety/competition, social capital, social embeddedness and cohesion.

=== Negotiation process ===
A study in 2023 pointed out that the emergence of SDG 10 was partially related to the 2008 financial crisis and its aftermath, which prompted calls for addressing extreme inequalities in outcomes and wealth concentration at the top of the income distribution. For comparison, the earlier Millennium Development Goals did not have a separate goal on inequality.

The same study found that in the agenda-setting phase, the World Bank significantly influenced the definition of SDG 10 during the negotiations. This reduced their need for later adjustments to comply with the goal. The bank succeeded in incorporating its goal of shared prosperity into SDG 10. Shared prosperity was a ready-made framework to use, and it left out sensitive political discussions around inequalities of outcome. The bank defined shared prosperity as increasing the income of the bottom 40 percent of the population in each country. The authors of the study pointed out that by doing so, the World Bank ensured that others would evaluate their success based on the bank’s own definition of inequality. The only difference between the first target of SDG 10 and the World Bank’s own internal goal is the addition of “higher than the national average.” The World Bank thus managed to enter its own framing into the global agenda and to block any possibly more radical global inequality narrative.

== Targets, indicators and progress ==
The UN has defined 10 targets and 11 indicators for SDG 10. Targets specify the goals and Indicators represent the metrics by which the world aims to track whether these Targets are achieved. SDG 10 covers issues including reducing income inequalities (10.1), promoting universal social, economic and political inclusion (10.2), ensure equal opportunities and end discrimination (10.3), adopt fiscal and social policies that promotes equality (10.4), improved regulation of global financial markets and institutions (10.5), enhanced representation for developing countries in financial institutions (10.6), responsible and well-managed migration policies (10.7), special and differential treatment for developing countries (10.a), encourage development assistance and investment in least developed countries (10.b) and reduced transaction costs for migrant remittances (10.c).

=== Target 10.1: Reduce income inequalities ===
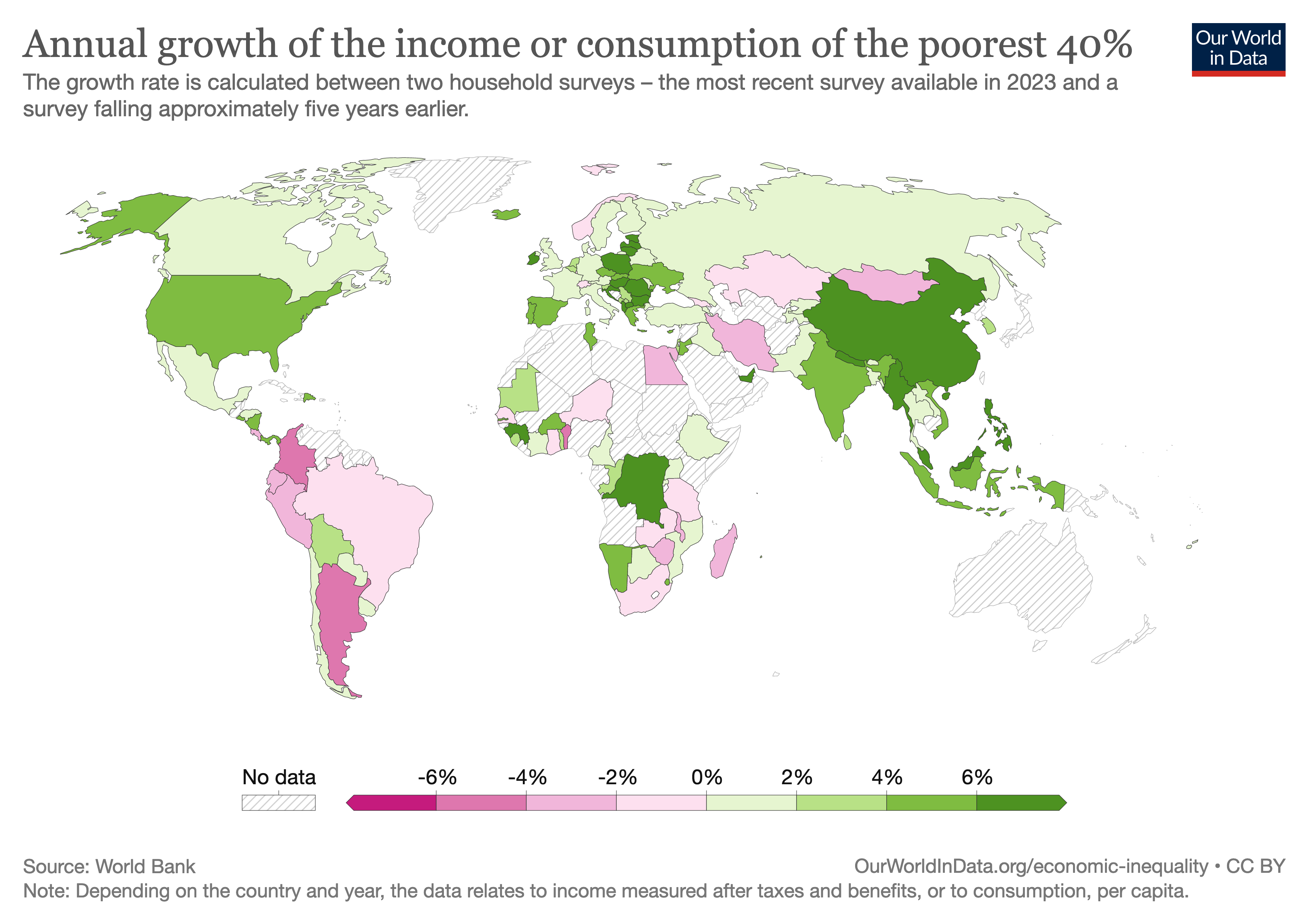
World map for Indicator 10.1.1: Average growth rate in per capita real survey mean consumption or income, bottom 40% of population (%)

The full title of Target 10.1 is: "By 2030, progressively achieve and sustain income growth of the bottom 40 per cent of the population at a rate higher than the national average".

Target 10.1 has one indicator: Indicator 10.1.1 is the "Growth rates of household expenditure or income per capita among the bottom 40 per cent of the population and the total population".

Relative poverty and inequality is the share of people living below 50 per cent of the median income level. Data from 110 high- and low-income countries showed that the median country had 14 per cent of the population with income levels below that threshold. But both rich and poor countries have high and low levels of inequality. Income inequality is not strongly correlated with either poverty or affluence, suggesting that policies promoting equality and inclusivity have universal relevance.

There has been a growth in income for poorer people in 2012–2017. Nevertheless, it is common in many countries that "the bottom 40 per cent of the population receive less than 25 per cent of the overall income".

=== Target 10.2: Promote universal social, economic and political inclusion ===
The full title of Target 10.2 is to: "By 2030, empower and promote the social, economic and political inclusion of all, irrespective of age, sex, disability, race, ethnicity, origin, religion or economic or other status".

Target 10.2 has one indicator. Indicator 10.2.1 is the "Proportion of people living below 50 per cent of median income, by sex, age and persons with disabilities".

=== Target 10.3: Ensure equal opportunities and end discrimination ===
The full title of Target 10.3 is to: "Ensure equal opportunity and reduce inequalities of outcome, including by eliminating discriminatory laws, policies and practices and promoting appropriate legislation, policies and action in this regard".

Target 10.3 has one indicator. Indicator 10.3.1 is the "Proportion of population reporting having personally felt discriminated against or harassed in the previous 12 months on the basis of a ground of discrimination prohibited under international human rights law".

A UN report from 2020 pointed out that "women are more likely to be victims of discrimination than men". And the situation is even worse for women with disabilities.

=== Target 10.4: Adopt fiscal and social policies that promote equality ===
The full title of Target 10.4 is to: "Adopt policies, especially fiscal, wage and social protection policies, and progressively achieve greater equality".

Target 10.4 has one indicator. Indicator 10.4.1 is the "Labour share of GDP, comprising wages and social protection transfers".

A UN progress report from 2020 stated that: "The global labour income share has shown a downward trend since 2004, when it stood at 54 percent, implying that workers are receiving a smaller proportion of the output they helped produce".

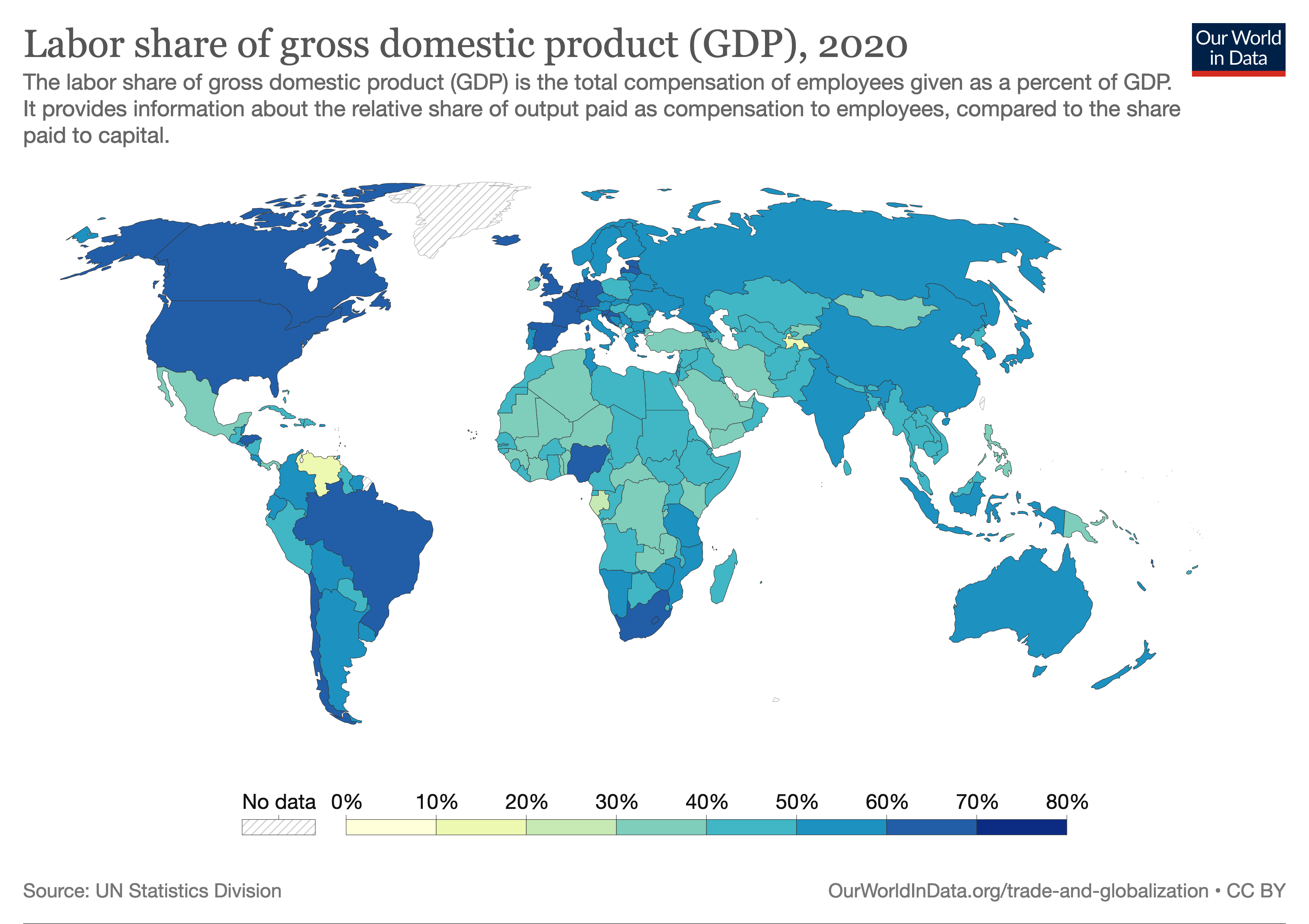
Labour share of GDP, comprising wages and social protection transfers (%)

=== Target 10.5: Improved regulation of global financial markets and institutions ===
The full title of Target 10.5 is to: "Improve the regulation and monitoring of global financial markets and institutions and strengthen the implementation of such regulations".

Target 10.5 has one indicator. Indicator 10.5.1 is the "Financial soundness indicator".

=== Target 10.6: Enhanced representation for developing countries in financial institutions ===
The full title of Target 10.6 is to: "Ensure enhanced representation and voice for developing countries in decision-making in global international economic and financial institutions in order to deliver more effective, credible, accountable and legitimate institutions".

Target 10.6 has one indicator. Indicator 10.6.1 is the "Proportion of members and voting rights of developing countries in international organizations".

These indicators measure the share of members and voting rights in international institutions which are held by developing countries.

=== Target 10.7: Responsible and well-managed migration policies ===
The full title of Target 10.7 is to: "Facilitate orderly, safe, regular and responsible migration and mobility of people, including through the implementation of planned and well-managed migration policies".

Target 10.7 has two indicators:

- Indicator 10.7.1: Recruitment cost borne by employee as a proportion of yearly income earned in country of destination
- Indicator 10.7.2: Number of countries that have implemented well-managed migration policies

There is a focus in this target and indicators on granting permission of temporary stays of forcibly displaced people, agreements on readmission, and monitoring of travel visa overstays. In effect, the 2030 Agenda frames migration as a temporary and unplanned phenomenon that needs to be managed, rather than as an inherent and longstanding part of sustainable development and social transformation. Insights from human migration science shows that migrants can in fact be a source of innovation, economic growth and cultural diversity.

=== Target 10.a: Special and differential treatment for developing countries ===
The full title of Target 10.a is to: "Implement the principle of special and differential treatment for developing countries, in particular least developed countries, in accordance with World Trade Organization agreements".

Target 10.a has one indicator. Indicator 10.a.1 is the "Proportion of tariff lines applied to imports from least developed countries and developing countries with zero-tariff".

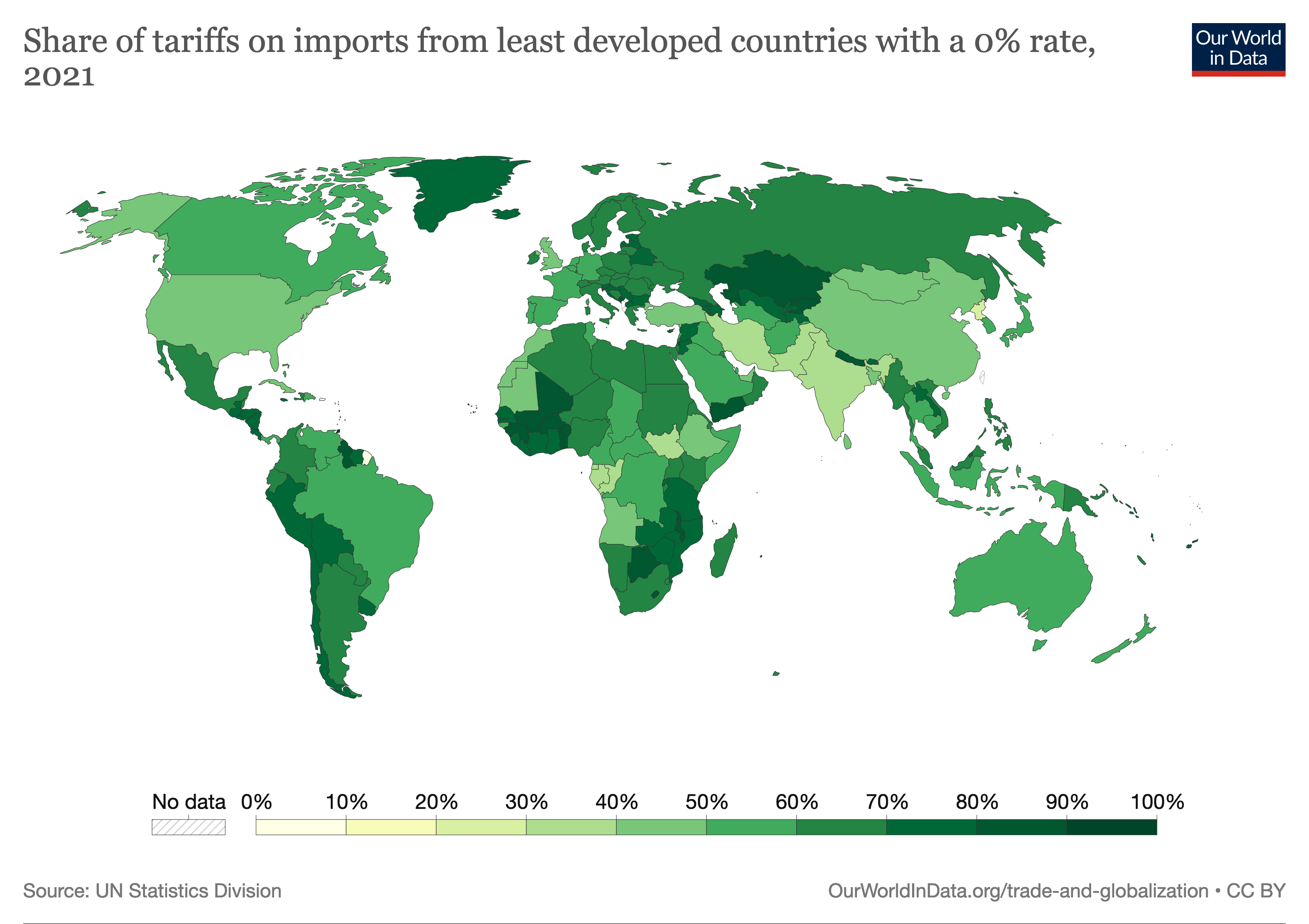
Proportion of tariff lines applied to imports with zero-tariff (%)

=== Target 10.b: Encourage development assistance and investment in least developed countries ===
The full title of Target 10.b is to: "Encourage official development assistance and financial flows, including foreign direct investment, to States where the need is greatest, in particular least developed countries, African countries, small island developing States and landlocked developing countries, in accordance with their national plans and programs".

Target 10.b has one indicator. Indicator 10.b.1 is the "Total resource flows for development, by recipient and donor countries and type of flow".

=== Target 10.c: Reduce transaction costs for migrant remittances ===
The full title of Target 10.c is to: "By 2030, reduce to less than 3 per cent the transaction costs of migrant remittances and eliminate remittance corridors with costs higher than 5 per cent".

Target 10.c has one indicator. Indicator 10.c.1 is the "Remittance costs as a proportion of the amount remitted".

Target 10.c is to reduce the transaction costs for migrant remittances to below 3 percent. The target of 3 percent was established as the cost that international migrant workers would pay to send money home (known as remittances). However, post offices and money transfer companies currently charge 6 percent of the amount remitted. Worse, commercial banks charge 11 percent. Prepaid cards and mobile money companies charge 2 to 4 percent, but those services were not widely available as of 2017 in typical "remittance corridors".

=== Custodian agencies ===
Nine custodian agencies monitor the eleven indicators of SDG 10. This makes the arrangement of custodian agencies highly fragmented for this SDG. As a result there is only very limited, informal coordination and "ad hoc forms of interorganisational knowledge sharing".

The custodian agencies include: World Bank (for four indicators), International Labor Organization (for two indicators), Office of the High Commissioner for Human Rights (this agency, and the following agencies, monitor just one indicator), International Monetary Fund, United Nations Department of Economic and Social Affairs Financing for Development Office, Organisation for Economic Co-operation and Development (OECD), International Trade Centre, UN Department of Economic and Social Affairs Population Division, International Organization for Migration.

== Monitoring ==
An annual report is prepared by the Secretary-General of the United Nations evaluating the progress towards the Sustainable Development Goals.

== Links with other SDGs ==
SDG 10 is linked to many of the other SDGs, such as peaceful and inclusive societies (SDG 16), gender equality (SDG 5), poverty (SDG 1), zero hunger (SDG 2), good health and wellbeing (SDG 3), clean water and sanitation (SDG 6), sustainable cities and communities (SDG 11).

== Challenges ==
=== Impacts of Covid-19 pandemic ===
The COVID-19 pandemic in 2020 made inequality worse. It has hit the most vulnerable people hardest. Due to the pandemic it is estimated that there will be an increase of more than 6% on average for the Gini Index of emerging markets and developing countries, with a much more devastating effect on the lesser developed countries of the world. The Gini Index is a ratio which is able to determine the income inequality where 0 means that all income is shared equally between all the population and 100 means all the income belongs to a single person.

== Organizations ==
Organizations that work on achieving SDG 10 include for example the World Bank, IMF, OECD, UN, WEF.
