= Sustainable Development Goal 7 =

UN Sustainable Development Goal related to clean energy

- Mission statement: "Ensure access to affordable, reliable, sustainable and modern energy for all"
- Commercial?: No
- Type of project: Non-Profit
- Location: Global
- Founder: United Nations
- Established: 2015
- Website: sdgs.un.org

Sustainable Development Goal 7 (SDG 7 or Global Goal 7) is one of 17 Sustainable Development Goals established by the United Nations General Assembly in 2015. It aims to "Ensure access to affordable, reliable, sustainable and modern energy for all." Access to energy is an important pillar for the wellbeing of the people as well as for economic development and poverty alleviation.

The goal has five targets to be achieved by 2030. Progress towards the targets is measured by six indicators. Three out of the five targets are outcome targets: Universal access to modern energy; increase global percentage of renewable energy; double the improvement in energy efficiency. The remaining two targets are means of implementation targets: to promote access to research, technology and investments in clean energy; and expand and upgrade energy services for developing countries. In other words, these targets include access to affordable and reliable energy while increasing the share of renewable energy in the global energy mix. They also focus on improving energy efficiency, international cooperation and investment in clean energy infrastructure, and equal rights to energy distribution.

According to a review report in 2019, some progress towards achieving SDG 7 is being made, but many of the targets of SDG 7 will not be met. SDG 7 and SDG 13 (climate action) are closely related.

== Problem description ==
Number of people in the world with and without access to electricity

SDG 7 is tackling the problem of the high number of people globally who live without access to electricity or clean cooking solutions (0.8 billion and 2.4 billion people, respectively, in 2020). Energy is needed for many important aspects of human life, including but not limited to transportation, cooking, healthcare services, and education.

People that are hard to reach with electricity and clean cooking solutions include those who live in remote areas or are internally displaced people, or those who live in urban slums or marginalized communities. As well as addressing a range of inequalities in the distribution of resources.

== Targets, indicators and progress ==
SDG 7 has five targets, measured with five indicators, which are to be achieved by 2030. Three out of the five targets are "outcome targets", and two are "means of achieving targets".

=== Target 7.1: Universal access to modern energy ===
The first target of SDG 7 is Target 7.1: "By 2030, ensure universal access to affordable, reliable and modern energy services".

This target has two indicators:

World map for Indicator 7.1.2 in 2016 - Share of the population with access to clean fuels for cooking

- Indicator 7.1.1: Proportion of population with access to electricity
- Indicator 7.1.2: Proportion of population with primary reliance on clean fuels and technology.

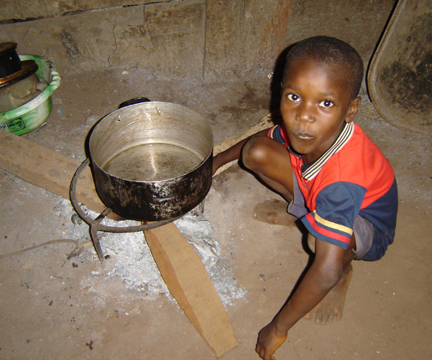
Indoor woodfire stove in Nigeria, causing indoor air pollution

A report from 2019 found that India, Bangladesh, and Kenya had made good progress with supplying more of their people with electricity. Globally as of 2023, there are 666 million people still without electricity, compared with 1.2 billion people in 2010.

Between 2010 and 2023, Central and Southern Asia were able to reduce their access gap from 414 million to 27 million, becoming the region that experienced the most dramatic progress in energy access in this period. In contrast, Sub-Saharan Africa was recognized as the region most in need of further improvement to energy access. In 2010, it accounted for 50% of the global population without access to electricity, and at the time of the writing of a 2025 SDG 7 progress report, that number had risen to 85%.

There are several options to tackle this problem, for example private sector financing and ensuring that rural areas get access to electricity. This may involve decentralized renewable energy.

Women are disproportionately affected by indoor air pollution caused by the use of fuels such as coal and wood indoors. Reasons for not changing over to clean cooking solutions can include higher fuel costs and the need to change cooking processes.

When looking at the SDG7 updated data, it is still evident that clean cooking continues to be a massive problem when attempting to give everyone access to clean modern energy. The International Energy Agency states that over 2 billion individuals around the world still did not have access to clean cooking solutions as of 2023, with the majority of these people living in rural areas in Asia and Africa. Progress was reportedly moving at a steady pace before it reset to a slower pace between 2019 and 2022. One reason progress seemingly came to a hault was because global change in the prices of energy and overall a reported decrease in the average household income, this unfortunately caused families to revert to their old ways of traditional cooking.

=== Target 7.2: Increase global percentage of renewable energy ===
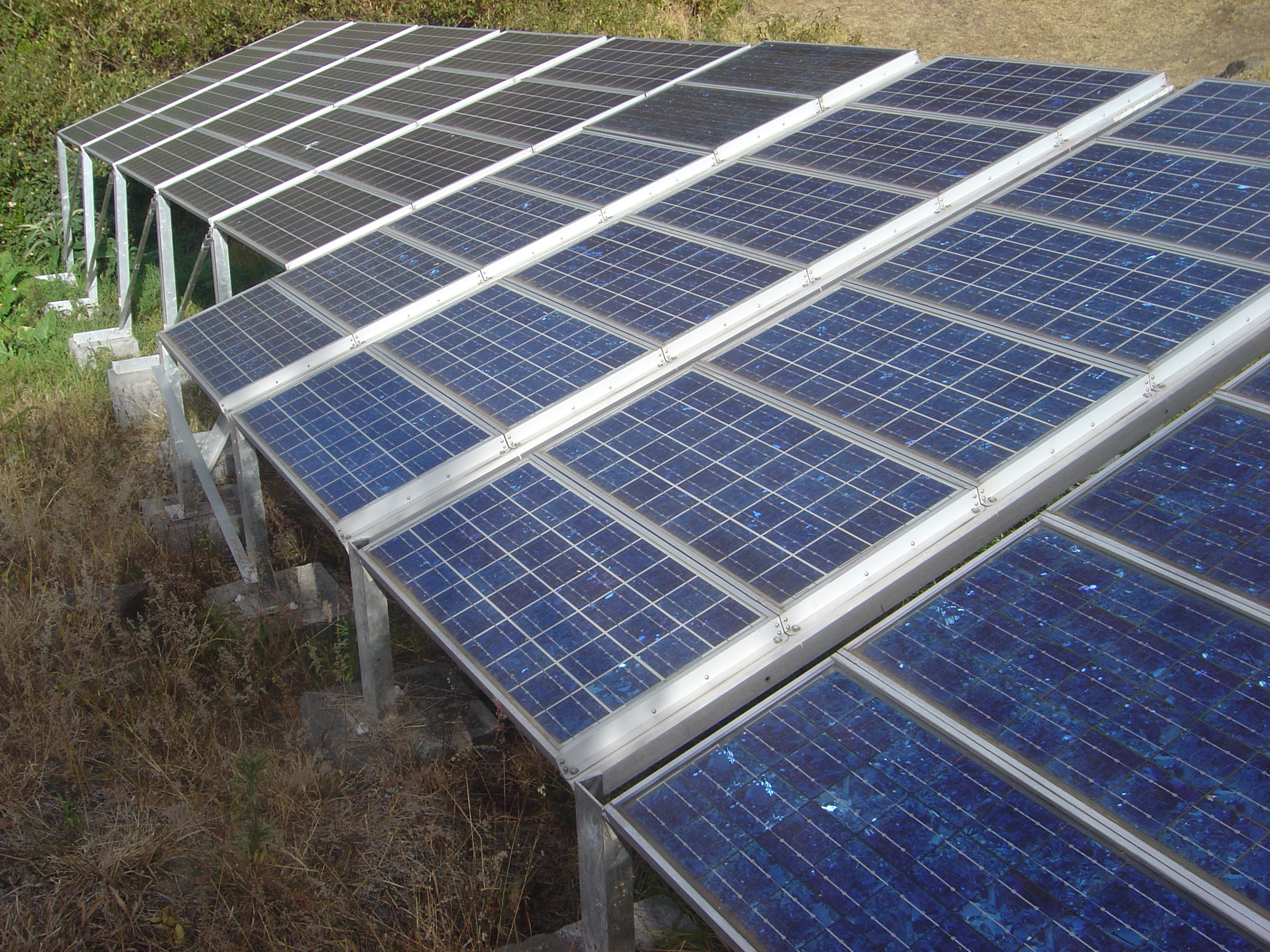
Solar panels in Réunion

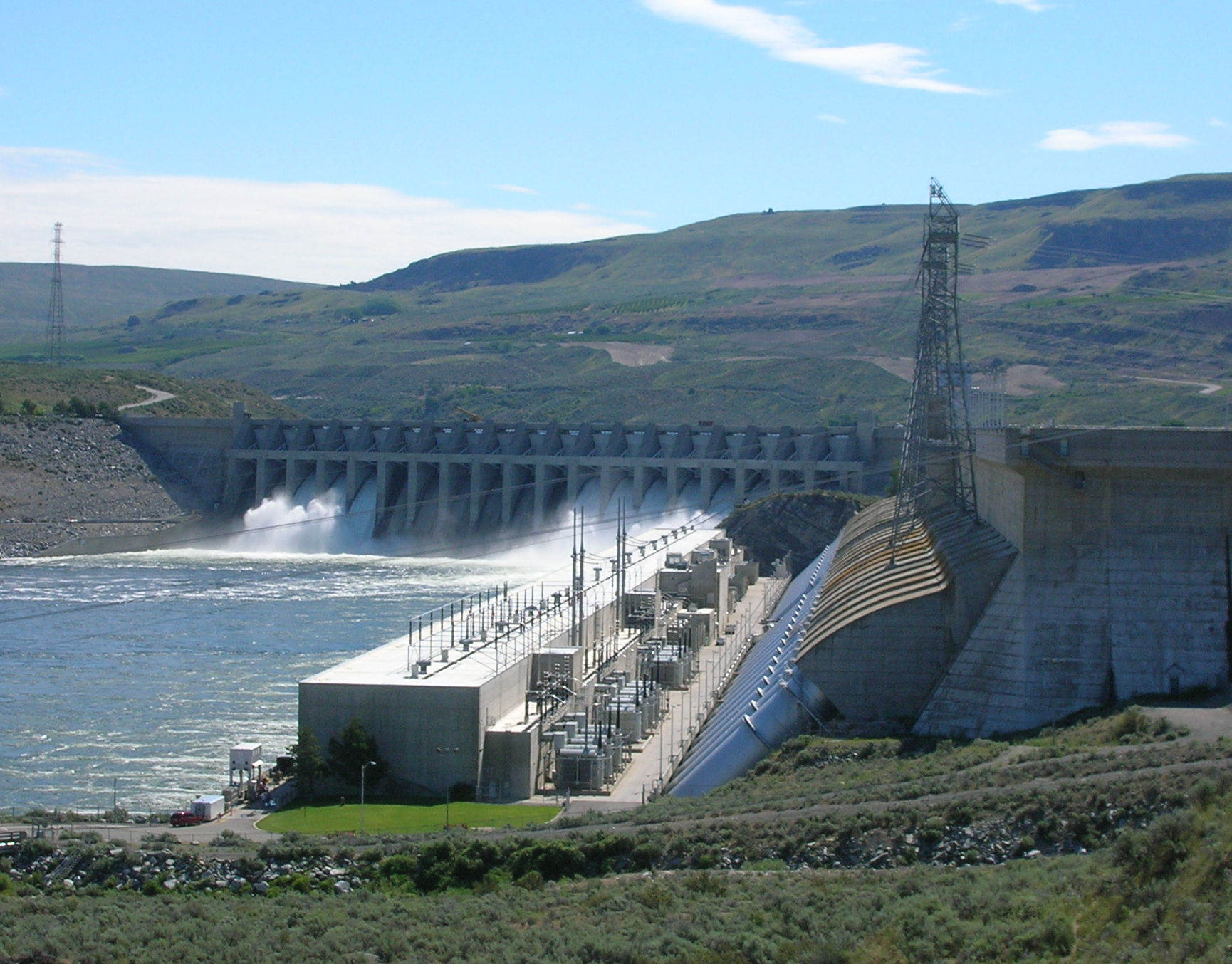
Chief Joseph Dam for hydropower, Washington, USA

The second target of SDG 7 is Target 7.2: "By 2030, increase substantially the share of renewable energy in the global energy mix."

It has only one indicator: Indicator 7.2.1 is the "Renewable energy share in the total final energy consumption".

Data from 2016 showed that the share of renewable energy compared to total energy consumption was 17.5%.

Energy intensity of economies

=== Target 7.3: Double the improvement in energy efficiency ===
The third target of SDG 7 is Target 7.3: "By 2030, double the global rate of improvement in energy efficiency".

It has one indicator: Indicator 7.3.1 is the "Energy intensity measured in terms of primary energy and GDP".

In general, energy efficiency has been going up in recent years, in particular in China. Governments can help with this process for example by providing suitable financial incentives and by helping people access information about energy efficiency.

=== Target 7.a: Promote access to research, technology and investments in clean energy ===
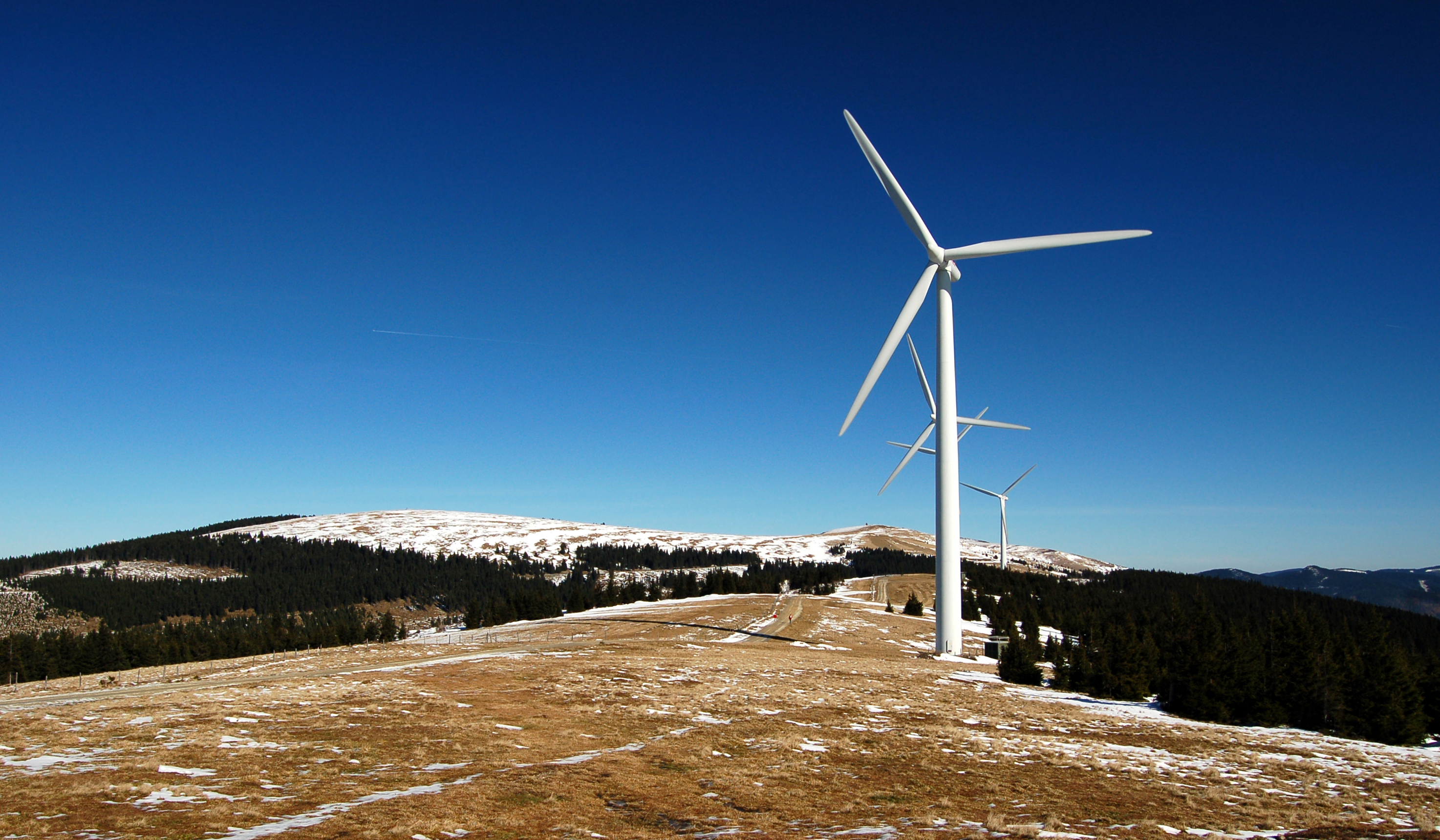
Wind turbines in Austria - one of the sources of clean renewable energy

International finance received for clean energy, 2016

The fourth target of SDG 7 is Target 7.a: "By 2030, enhance international cooperation to facilitate access to clean energy research and technology, including renewable energy, energy efficiency and advanced and cleaner fossil-fuel technology, and promote investment in energy infrastructure and clean energy technology".

It has one indicator: Indicator 7.4.1 is the "International financial flows to developing countries in support of clean energy research and development and renewable energy production, including in hybrid systems".

There is twice the amount of international financing for renewable energy going to developing countries in 2017 compared to 2010. In 2017 most of this financing (nearly half) went to hydropower and nearly 20% to solar power projects.

More investments are needed for global energy access, namely for electrification and clean cooking: A report in 2021 state that "the financing community is failing to deliver on SDG7".

=== Target 7.b: Expand and upgrade energy services for developing countries ===
The fifth target of SDG 7 is formulated as: "Target 7.b: By 2030, expand infrastructure and upgrade technology for supplying modern and sustainable energy services for all in developing countries, in particular least developed countries, small island developing States, and land-locked developing countries, in accordance with their respective programs of support."

It has one indicator, which used to measure "Investments in energy efficiency as a proportion of GDP and the amount of foreign direct investment in financial transfer for infrastructure and technology to sustainable development services," but this has since been changed. The current indicator is 7.b.1: "Installed renewable energy-generating capacity in developing and developed countries (in watts per capita)."

As of August 2020, there is no data available for this indicator.

It was reported in 2020 that Indicator 7.b.1 might be removed as it is identical with indicator 12.1.1 of SDG 12.

=== Custodian agencies ===
There are five custodian agencies for SDG 7 which together published the 2025 Energy Progress Report:

- International Energy Agency (IEA)
- International Renewable Energy Agency (IRENA)
- United Nations Statistics Division (UNSD)
- World Bank (WB)
- World Health Organization (WHO)

Custodian agencies are in charge of reporting on the following indicators:

- Indicators 7.1.1 and 7.1.2: World Bank (WB) and World Health Organization (WHO).
- Indicator 7.2.1: Department of Economic and Social Affairs-Statistics Division (DESA/UNDP), International Energy Agency (IEA) and International Renewable Energy Agency (IRENA).
- Indicator 7.3.1 are Department of Economic and Social Affairs-Statistics Division (DESA/UNDP) and International Energy Agency (IEA).
- Indicator 7.a.1: Organization for Economic Cooperation and Development (OECD) and International Renewable Energy Agency (IRENA).
- Indicator 7.b.1: International Energy Agency (IEA).

== Overall progress and monitoring ==
The UN High-Level Political Forum on Sustainable Development (HLPF) meets every year for global monitoring of the SDGs, under the auspices of the United Nations economic and Social Council. High-level progress reports for all the SDGs are published by the United Nations Secretary General.

In 2022, the renewable energy- generating capacity in developing countries has increased by 58% in renewable capacity per capita. However, the international financial flows to developing countries to support renewable energy was 24% lower than in 2018. Despite having progress in 2019 to 2020, there has been recent global events such as the Russian invasion of Ukraine has impacted global progress in renewable energy and decarbonization transition by having it at a halt or decreasing rather than increasing.

Despite progress, the world is in 2022 not on track to achieve SDG 7. The progress towards SDG 7 has not been faster due to the world entering its third year of COVID-19 along with the highest number of violent conflicts and with the Russian invasion of Ukraine creating one of the largest refugee crises to happen. There are still over 700 million people without access to electricity and about 2.4 billion cooking with harmful fuels that also are polluting the environment. More efforts need to be exerted to improved use of renewable energy and energy efficiency faster. These events has had catastrophic effect the livelihoods of many people and though in 2021, as the global economy started to rebound, these chain of events and negative effects as caused the global economy and progress to SDG 7 and other SDGs to slow down.

According to the 2020 SDG report, affordable and reliable energy is now needed more than ever, especially after the COVID-19 pandemic, to supply hospitals and health facilities as well as access to energy for students learning remotely. Access to electricity has improved strongly in Asia and Latin America, so that an increasing share of people without access live in Sub-Saharan Africa. It is estimated that around 620 million people would still lack access to electricity if the world continues to move at the current pace by 2030.

Although efforts to move toward the goal of SDG7 have continued to occur as of 2024, tracking reports from Internatial Renewable Energy Agency, also known as the (IRENA) suggest that the current progress is not adequate to finish for the 2030 target.

== Challenges ==
In 2020, it was reported that many health facilities in developing countries (about 25%) still have no electricity at all or have frequent outages. This was particularly problematic during the COVID-19 pandemic. During the crisis progress has been seen in some aspect of SDG7 such as improvement in energy efficiency, use of renewable energy and increased access to electricity to people. Even in developed countries, there are still energy-poor groups. For example, the Aboriginal people living in remote areas of Canada, the Inuit, etc., most of them still use expensive and inconveniently supplied diesel engines.

== Links with other SDGs ==
The SDGs are all interlinked. Energy (or SDG 7) is key to most global issues: this includes poverty eradication (SDG 1), gender equality (SDG 5), climate action (SDG 13), food security (SDG 2), health (SDG 3), education (SDG 4), sustainable cities (SDG 11), jobs (SDG 8) and transport (SDG 9).

SDG 7 and SDG 13 (climate action) are closely related.

Access to energy is directly related to human development. This is particularly true for women, who spend more of their time collecting fuel and water, and preparing meals. Access to energy would allow them to spend more time on education and work. Women need to be given equal pay, equal treatment and equal status.

According to UN Women, energy interventions that take into perspective women's needs have a significant impact on addressing gender equality and community energy poverty while also ensuring the equal participation of women in energy intervention that in turn benefits the society at large.

== See also ==
- Sustainable Energy for All
