= Sustainable Development Goal 1 =

First of 17 Sustainable Development Goals to end global poverty

- Mission statement: "End poverty in all its forms everywhere"
- Commercial?: No
- Type of project: Non-Profit
- Location: Global
- Founder: United Nations
- Established: 2015
- Website: sdgs.un.org

The Sustainable Development Goal 1 (abbr. SDG 1 or Global Goal 1), one of the 17 Sustainable Development Goals established by the United Nations in 2015, calls for the end of poverty in all forms. The official wording is: "No Poverty". Member countries have pledged to "Leave No One Behind": underlying the goal is a "powerful commitment to leave no one behind and to reach those farthest behind first".

SDG 1 aims to eradicate every form of extreme poverty including the lack of food, clean drinking water, and sanitation. Achieving this goal includes finding solutions to new threats caused by climate change and conflict. SDG 1 focuses not just on people living in poverty, but also on the services people rely on and social policy that either promotes or prevents poverty.

The goal has seven targets and 13 indicators to measure progress. The five outcome targets are: eradication of extreme poverty; reduction of all poverty by half; implementation of social protection systems; ensuring equal rights to ownership, basic services, technology and economic resources; and the building of resilience to environmental, economic and social disasters. The two targets related to means of implementation SDG 1 are mobilization of resources to end poverty; and the establishment of poverty eradication policy frameworks at all levels.

Despite the ongoing progress, 10 percent of the world's population live in poverty and struggle to meet basic needs such as health, education, and access to water and sanitation. Extreme poverty remains prevalent in low-income countries, particularly those affected by conflict and political upheaval. In 2015, more than half of the world's 736 million people living in extreme poverty lived in Sub-Saharan Africa. The rural poverty rate stands at 17.2 percent and 5.3 percent in urban areas (in 2016).

One of the key indicators that measure poverty is the proportion of population living below the international and national poverty line. Measuring the proportion of the population covered by social protection systems and living in households with access to basic services is also an indication of the level of poverty.

== Background ==
The poverty data shown here are based on the September 2024 World Bank Poverty and Inequality Platform (PIP) vintage with the 2017 PPPs and the June 2025 PIP vintage with the 2021 PPPs. Hence, the difference between the two series is not only due to new PPPs and the new international poverty line, but also due to the inclusion of new survey data. Dashed lines are projected data or nowcasts.

In 2013, an estimated 385 million children lived on less than US$1.90 per day. These figures are unreliable due to huge gaps in data on the status of children worldwide.

Since 1990, countries around the world have taken various measures to reduce poverty and achieved remarkable results. The number of people living in extreme poverty decreased from 1.8 billion to 776 million in 2013. Still, people continue to live in poverty with the World Bank having estimated that 40 million to 60 million people will have fallen into extreme poverty in the year 2020. Changes relative to higher poverty lines, not just extreme poverty, are also tracked.

The World Bank's 2024 analysis shows that 22 low-income countries, representing 7% of the global population, have experienced only a 0.26% annual GDP growth since the late 1980s.

== Targets, indicators and progress ==
Poverty eradication is important for the reduction of inequalities that currently exist among people and for the socio-economic and political stability of countries left behind. The UN defined 7 Targets and 14 Indicators for SDGs 1. The main data source for SDGs 1 indicators (including maps) come from Our World in Data's SDGs Tracker. The targets cover a wide range of issues including the eradication of extreme poverty (target 1.1), reduction of poverty by half (1.2), implementation of social protection systems (1.3), ensuring equal rights to ownership, basic services, technology and economic resources (1.4), building of resilience towards environmental, economic and social disasters (1.5), and mobilization of resources to end poverty (1.6).

Targets specify the goals while indicators represent the metrics by which the world aims to track whether these targets are achieved. SDG 1 has two specific poverty reduction targets: eradicating extreme poverty (target 1.1) and reduce poverty by half by 2030 (target 1.2).

Five of the targets are to be reached by 2030, and two have no specified date.

=== Target 1.1: extreme poverty ===
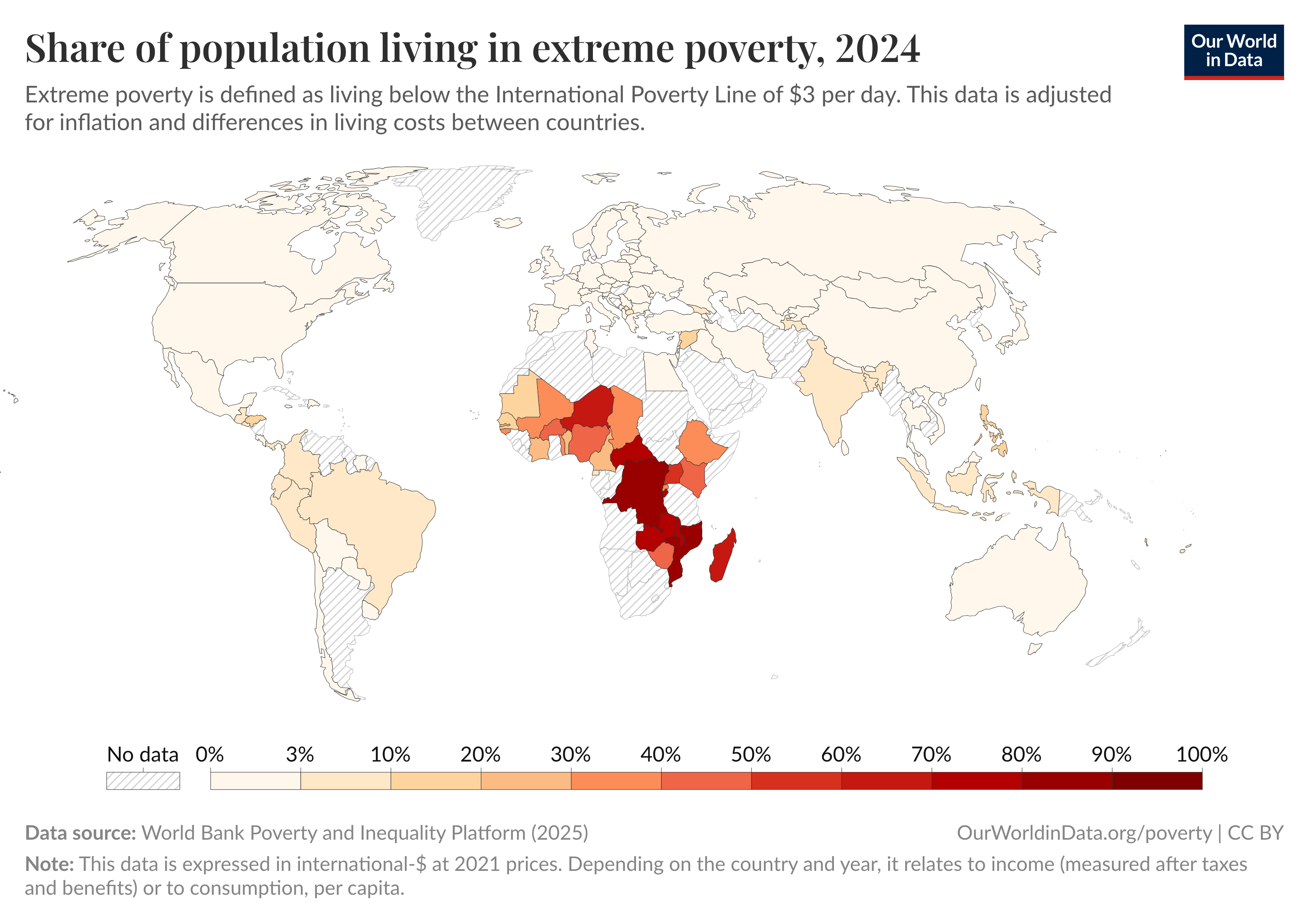
Share of population living in extreme poverty, 2024

The full text of Target 1.1 is: By 2030, eradicate extreme poverty for all people everywhere, currently defined as living on less than $3.00 per person per day at 2021 purchasing power parity.

Target 1.1 includes one indicator: Indicator 1.1.1 is the "Proportion of population living below the international poverty line aggregated by sex, age, employment status, and geographical location (urban/rural)".

Due to the increase in PPP by $0.85 ($3.00 from $2.15), it is estimated that almost 9.9 percent of the world's population (808 million people) would be living in extreme poverty. It represents an increase of 19.35% in the estimated number of extremely poor in comparison to the previous estimate of 677 million people.

A study published in September 2020 found that extreme poverty had increased by 7 percent in just a few months, after a steady decrease for the last 20 years.

=== Target 1.2: Reduce poverty by at least 50% ===
The full text of Target 1.2 is: "By 2030, reduce at least by half the proportion of men, women and children of all ages living in poverty in all its dimensions according to national definitions."

Indicators include:

- Indicator 1.2.1: Proportion of population living below the national poverty line.
- Indicator 1.2.2: Proportion of men, women and children of all ages living in poverty in all its dimensions according to national definitions.

=== Target 1.3: Implement nationally appropriate social protection systems ===
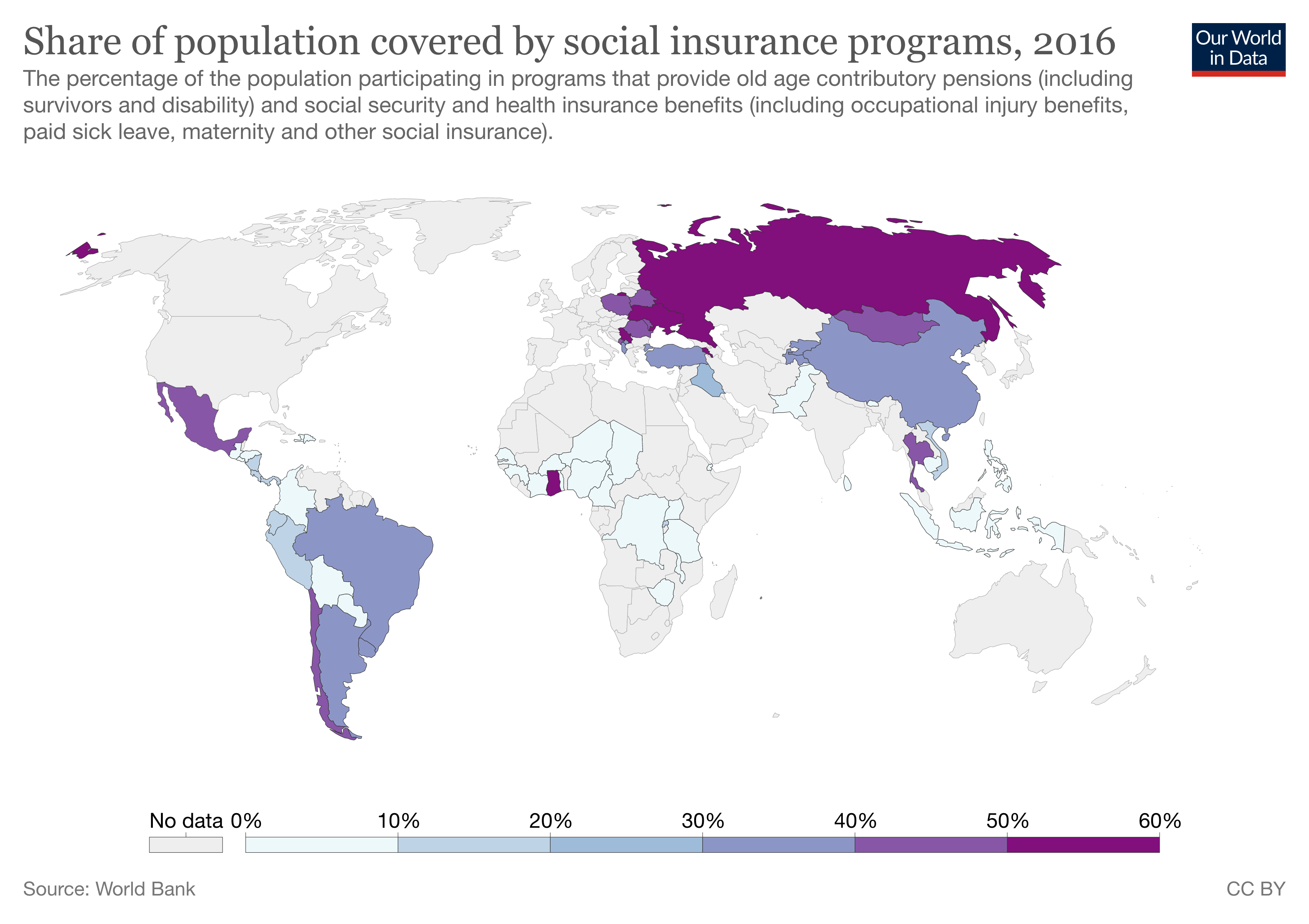
Coverage of social insurance programs shows the percentage of population participating in programs that provide old age contributory pensions

The full text of Target 1.3 is: "Implement nationally appropriate social protection systems and measures for all, by 2030 achieve substantial coverage of the poor and the vulnerable."

Indicator 1.3.1 is the "Proportion of population covered by social protection systems, by sex, distinguishing children, unemployed persons, older persons, persons with disabilities, pregnant women, newborns, work-injury victims and the poor and the vulnerable".

=== Target 1.4: Equal rights to ownership, basic services, technology, and economic resources ===
The full text of Target 1.4 is: "By 2030, ensure that all men and women, in particular the poor and the vulnerable, have equal rights to economic resources, as well as access to basic services, ownership and control over land and other forms of property, inheritance, natural resources, appropriate new technology and financial services, including micro-finance."

Its two indicators are:

- Indicator 1.4.1: Proportion of population living in households with access to basic services.
- Indicator 1.4.2: Proportion of total adult population with secure tenure rights to land, (a) with legally recognized documentation, and (b) who perceive their rights to land as secure, by sex and type of tenure.

=== Target 1.5: Build resilience to environmental, economic, and social disasters ===
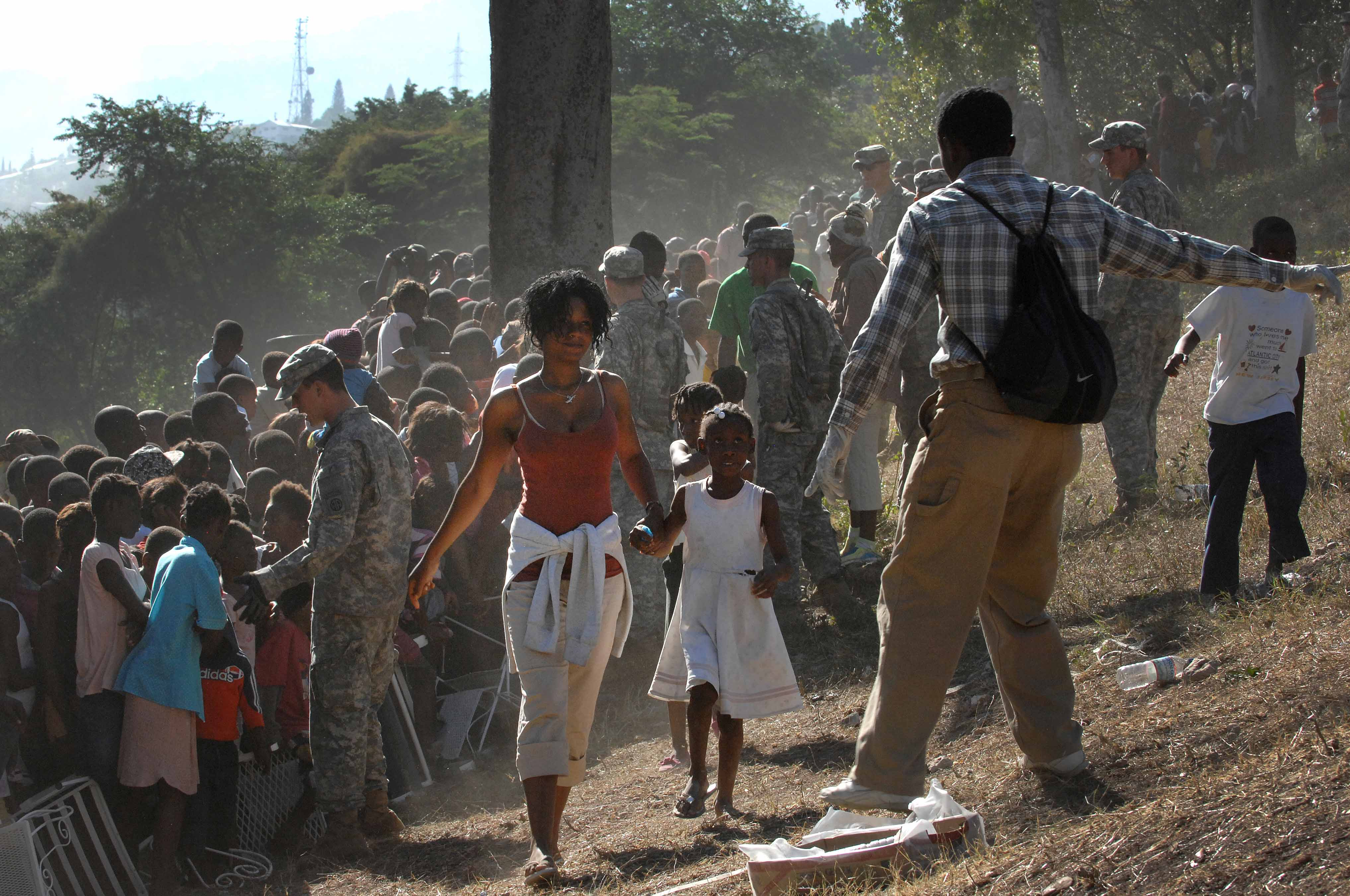
A Haitian woman walks with her child toward the distribution line in Port-au-Prince, Haiti, after a massive earthquake shook the whole country in 2010.

The full text of Target 1.5 is: "By 2030, build the resilience of the poor and those in vulnerable situations and reduce their exposure and vulnerability to climate-related extreme events and other economic, social and environmental shocks and disasters."

It has four indicators:

- Indicator 1.5.1: Number of deaths, missing persons and directly affected persons attributed to disasters.
- Indicator 1.5.2: Direct economic loss attributed to disasters in relation to global gross domestic product (GDP).
- Indicator 1.5.3: Number of countries that adopt and implement national disaster risk reduction strategies in line with the Sendai Framework for Disaster Risk Reduction 2015–2030.
- Indicator 1.5.4: Proportion of local governments that adopt and implement local disaster risk reduction strategies in line with national disaster risk reduction strategies.

=== Target 1.a: Mobilization of resources to end poverty ===
The text of Target 1.a is: "Ensure significant mobilization of resources from a variety of sources, including through enhanced development cooperation in order to provide adequate and predictable means for developing countries particularly least developed countries."

It has three indicators:

- Indicator 1.a.1: Proportion of domestically generated resources allocated by the government directly to poverty reduction programmes.
- Indicator 1.a.2: Proportion of total government spending on essential services (education, health and social protection).
- Indicator 1.a.3: Sum of total grants and non-debt-creating inflows directly allocated to poverty reduction programmes as a proportion of GDP.

A proposal has been tabled in 2020 to delete Target 1.a.

=== Target 1.b: Establishment of poverty eradication policy frameworks at all levels ===
The full text of Target 1.b is: "Create sound policy frameworks at the national, regional and international levels, based on pro-poor and gender-sensitive development strategies, to support accelerated investment in poverty eradication actions."

It has one indicator: Indicator 1.b.1 is the "Pro-poor public social spending".

=== Custodian agencies ===
Custodian agencies are in charge of measuring the progress of the indicators:

- For Indicator 1.1.1: World Bank (WB) and International Labor Organization (ILO)
- For Indicator 1.2.1: WB
- For Indicator 1.2.2: National Statistics Offices, WB, UNICEF and UNDP
- For Indicator 1.3.1: ILO and WB
- For Indicator 1.4.1: United Nations Human Settlements Programme (UN-HABITAT)
- For Indicator 1.4.2: WB and UN-HABITAT collectively.
- For all four Indicators under Target 1.5: United Nations International Strategy for Disaster Reduction (UNISDR)
- For Indicator 1.a.1: Organisation for Economic Co-operation and Development (OECD)
- For Indicator 1.a.2: UNESCO-UIS
- For Indicator 1.b.1: UNICEF and Save the Children

== Monitoring ==
The UN High-Level Political Forum on Sustainable Development (HLPF) meets every year for global monitoring of the SDGs, under the auspices of the United Nations economic and Social Council. High-level progress reports for all the SDGs are published by the United Nations Secretary General.

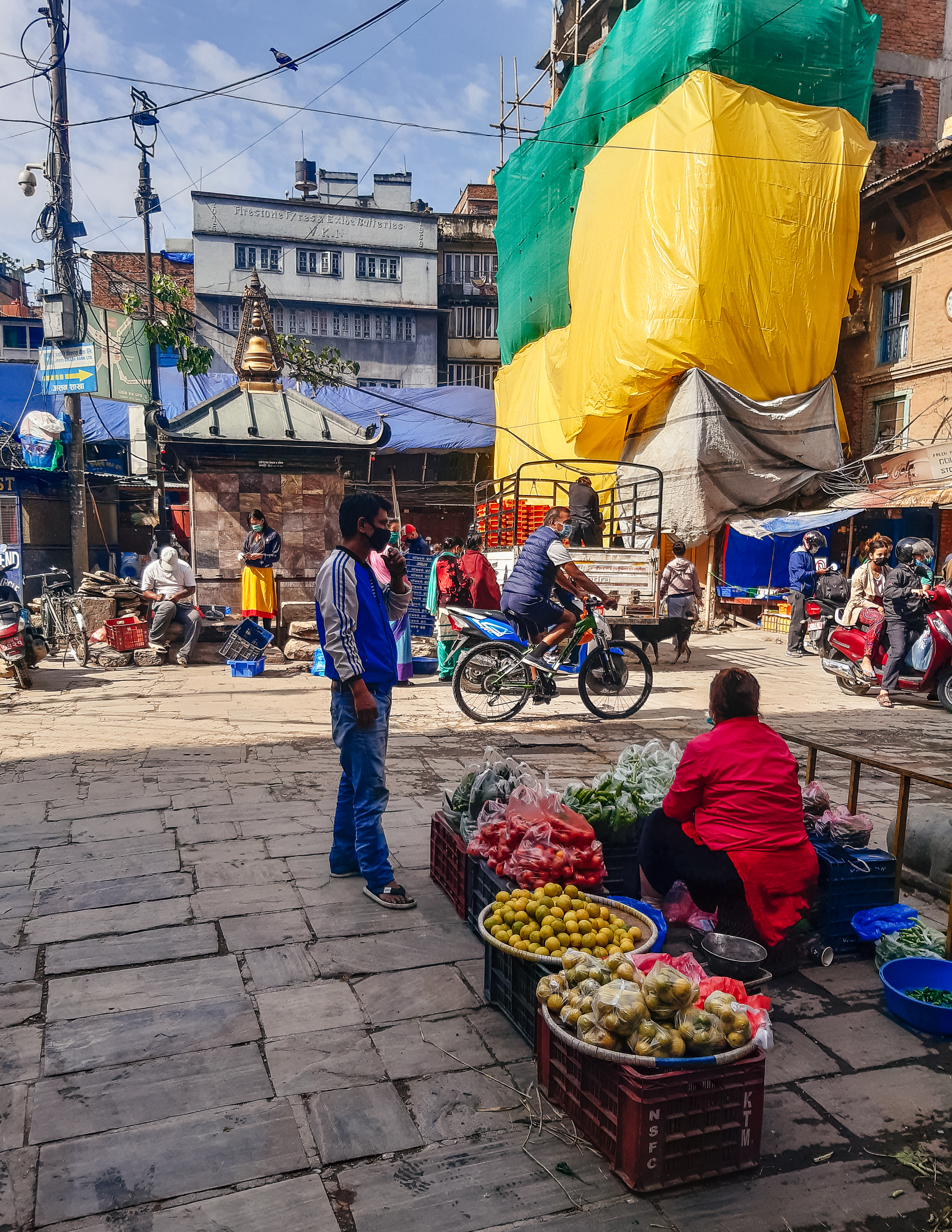
Fruit vendor during COVID-19 pandemic trying to get some money to buy food for their families in Kathmandu

== Reception ==
SDG1 and poverty eradication is a pressing goal for many. Recent public endorsements include the 2024 G20 Leaders' Summit held in Brazil officially launching an alliance aimed at accelerating the process of eradicating hunger and poverty and promoting Sustainable Development Goals 1 and 2. Pope Leo XIV has also endorsed SDG1, calling for urgent attention to the goal of eradicating of world poverty in his teaching on Christian love for the poor.

Receptions of SDG1 remain varied. With 2030 agenda targets falling short, critics say the goal lacks overall progress, an effective definition of poverty, political and financial specificity, and accurate target measurements.

== Challenges ==
=== Impact of COVID-19 pandemic ===
Eradicating poverty has been made more difficult by the COVID-19 pandemic in 2020. Local and national lockdowns led to a collapse in economic activity that reduced or eliminated sources of income and accelerated poverty.

COVID-19 has caused an increase in global poverty. It was estimated that 71 million people have been pushed into extreme poverty in 2020. The lock down has led to a collapse in economic activities hence causing reduced income leading to accelerated poverty. It is reported that young workers are two times more seemingly to be suffering from unemployment than their elders. There are projections that Sub-Saharan Africa will have the highest rate of increasing poverty because it already has more populations living close to the international poverty line.

COVID-19 has further increased the challenges of achieving zero poverty goals as well as other SDG goals by 2030. Though many alternative measures are being deployed to get the relevant data, the available tools and methods have not been able to sufficiently address the continuously evolving climate.

In order to achieve and sufficiently monitor the progress of SDGs, decision makers as well as stake holders need access to timely and reliable data. As countries got locked down in 2020 due to the COVID-19 pandemic, many data collection activities that rely on direct interviews were suspended. The pandemic interrupted data collection. Decision-makers did not have access to reliable data, especially in the early months.

Furthermore, COVID-19 exposed the inadequacy in the global food chain. The pandemic had a resounding impact on fragile nations; for example, 15.6 million Yemeni nationals were estimated in September 2020 to be practically starving on a daily basis with millions more being driven into a state of distress.

=== Impact on Conflict-affected Zones ===
Conflicts greatly affect the people and the economies it prevails in. Extreme poverty rises as a country faces a conflict or instability. According to the World Bank report, 39 economies are facing a conflict or instability out of which 21 are classified as in active conflict. In such economies, the extreme-poverty rate is nearly 40% whereas in developing economies it has been cut to just 6%.

==== Russia Invasion of Ukraine ====
The 2022 Russian invasion of Ukraine severely impacted global trade, causing a spike in food and energy prices and impeding access to finance, which is expected to increase the severity of poverty, if not its absolute prevalence. As of December 2024, UNICEF estimates that 65% of Ukrainian children live in poverty. Furthermore, 6.86 million Ukrainians have been recorded as refugees all around the world, the majority of whom are women and children.

==== Sudanese Civil War ====
The internal civil war has caused an economic crisis in Sudan. The World Bank estimated that Sudan's real GDP shrank by 29.4% in 2023 and an additional 14% in 2025. As of August 2025, the UN indicates that about 50% of Sudan's population (26 million people) face acute hunger. The year-on-year inflation decelerated to 78.4% in July 2025, after it surged to 170% in 2024. Moreover, the extreme poverty rate more than doubled during the conflict, rising from 23% in 2022 to 59% in 2024.

== Agenda 2030 ==
=== Goal 1. End Poverty in all its forms everywhere. ===
The agenda 2030 recognize that eradicating poverty in all its forms and dimensions, including extreme poverty, is the greatest global challenge and an indispensable development in its three dimensions-economic, social and environmental in a balanced integrated manner. To end poverty and hunger everywhere to combat inequalities within and among countries, to build peaceful just and enclosure societies, to protect human right and promote gender equality and the empowerment of women and girls and to insure the lasting protection of plant and its natural resources.

- By 2030, eradicate extreme poverty for all people everywhere, currently measured as people living on less than $1.25 a day.
- By 2030, reduce at least by half the proportion of men, women and children of all ages living in poverty in all its dimension according to national department.
- By 2030, ensure that all men and women, in particular the poor and the vulnerable have equal right to economic resources, as well as access to basic services, ownership and control over land and other form or property, inheritance, natural resources propriety new technology and financial services, including micro finance.

=== Goal 2. End hunger, achieve food security and improved nutrition and promote sustainable agriculture. ===
By 2030, end hunger and ensure all people, in particular the poor and people in vulnerable situation, including infants to safe, nutritious and sufficient food all year round.

By 2030, end all forms of malnutrition, including achieving, by 2025, the internationally agreed targets on stunting and wasting in children under 5 years of age, and address the nutritional needs of adolescents girls, pregnant and lactating women and older persons.

== Links with other SDGs ==
The 17 SDGs are described by the UN as interdependent, with a unique recognition to the interconnectedness of SDG1. The UN SDG preamble states, "We recognise that eradicating poverty in all its forms and dimensions, including extreme poverty, is the greatest global challenge and an indispensable requirement for sustainable development." The achievement of SDG1 could positively affect many of the other SDG outcomes, as well as substantiate the use of other SDGs as methods for achieving SDG1. Interactions between SDGs are conditional and will not operate the same everywhere.

Eradicating poverty could lead to zero hunger (SDG 2): People with less money put proportionally more of their of income towards food expenses, making it difficult to meet basic nutrition needs. Poverty eradication could lead to accessible, nutritious food for all.

Eradicating poverty could lead to good health and well-being (SDG 3): Poverty creates barriers to health and wellbeing in many ways. An eradication of all poverty could improve health and wellbeing to the point of increased life expectancy for a large population

Eradicating poverty could lead to quality education (SDG 4): Financial barriers are of big concern in educational access, linking poverty directly to wide-spread educational attainment. Quality education could also lead to eradicating poverty, as people with higher educational-attainment, are less likely to live in poverty.

Gender equality could lead to eradicating poverty (SDG 5): Increasing women's rights and community contributions has shown to decrease average household poverty rates.

Affordable and clean energy could lead to eradicating poverty (SDG 7): Inadequate access to basic needs drives poverty. Energy poverty affects a large number of households, and reducing this number would directly reduce overall poverty.

Decent work and economic growth could lead to eradicating poverty (SDG 8): Decent work is partially defined by jobs that pay enough to satisfy basic needs. Poverty is the wide-spread result of this target not yet being achieved.

Eradicating poverty could lead to reduced inequalities (SDG 10): Socio-economic status is one of many inequalities attempted to be addressed by poverty eradication.Eradicating poverty could lead to reduced inequalities (SDG 10): Socio-economic status is one of many inequalities attempted to be addressed by poverty eradication.

== Organizations ==
Organizations dedicated to eradicating extreme poverty to aid in achieving SDG 1 include:

- Oxfam International
- The Organization for Poverty Alleviation and Development (OPAD)
- End Poverty Now
- The Global Citizen
- The Humanitarian Organization for Poverty Eradication
- Concern Worldwide
- World Relief
- ONE Campaign
- Care International
- Institute for Research on Poverty
- World Vision
