= Sustainable Development Goal 5 =

Global goal to achieve gender equality by 2030

- Mission statement: "Achieve gender equality and empower all women and girls"
- Commercial?: No
- Type of project: Sustainable Development Goal
- Location: Global
- Founder: United Nations
- Established: 2015
- Website: sdgs.un.org

Sustainable Development Goal 5 (SDG 5 or Global Goal 5) concerns gender equality and is fifth of the 17 Sustainable Development Goals established by United Nations in 2015. Through the pledge to "Leave No One Behind", countries have committed to fast-track progress for those furthest behind first. SDG 5 aims to grant women and girls equal rights and opportunities to live free of violence and discrimination, including in the workplace.

SDG 5 has nine targets and 14 indicators. Six of the targets are outcome targets:

- ending all forms of discrimination against all women and girls everywhere
- ending violence and exploitation of women and girls
- eliminating harmful practices such as child early and forced marriage and female genital mutilation
- increasing value of unpaid care and promoting shared domestic responsibilities
- ensuring full participation of women in leadership and decision-making
- ensuring access to universal reproductive rights and health.

The three means of implementation targets are:

- fostering equal rights to economic resources, property ownership, and financial services for women
- promoting empowerment of women through technology
- adopting and strengthening policies for gender equality, and supporting legislation to enforce it.

The COVID-19 pandemic in 2020 also posed a challenge in achieving gender equality. The impact of COVID-19 on women has been significant. Some examples include compounded economic impacts, increased unpaid care work (such as during school closures), an increase in domestic violence and other factors.

== Background ==
The Sustainable Development Goals are a collection of 17 global goals set by the United Nations. The broad goals are thematically linked, yet each has its own specific targets to achieve. The SDGs cover a broad range of social and economic development issues, including poverty, hunger, health, education, climate change, gender equality, water supply, sanitation, energy, urbanization, environment and social justice.

== Targets, indicators and progress ==
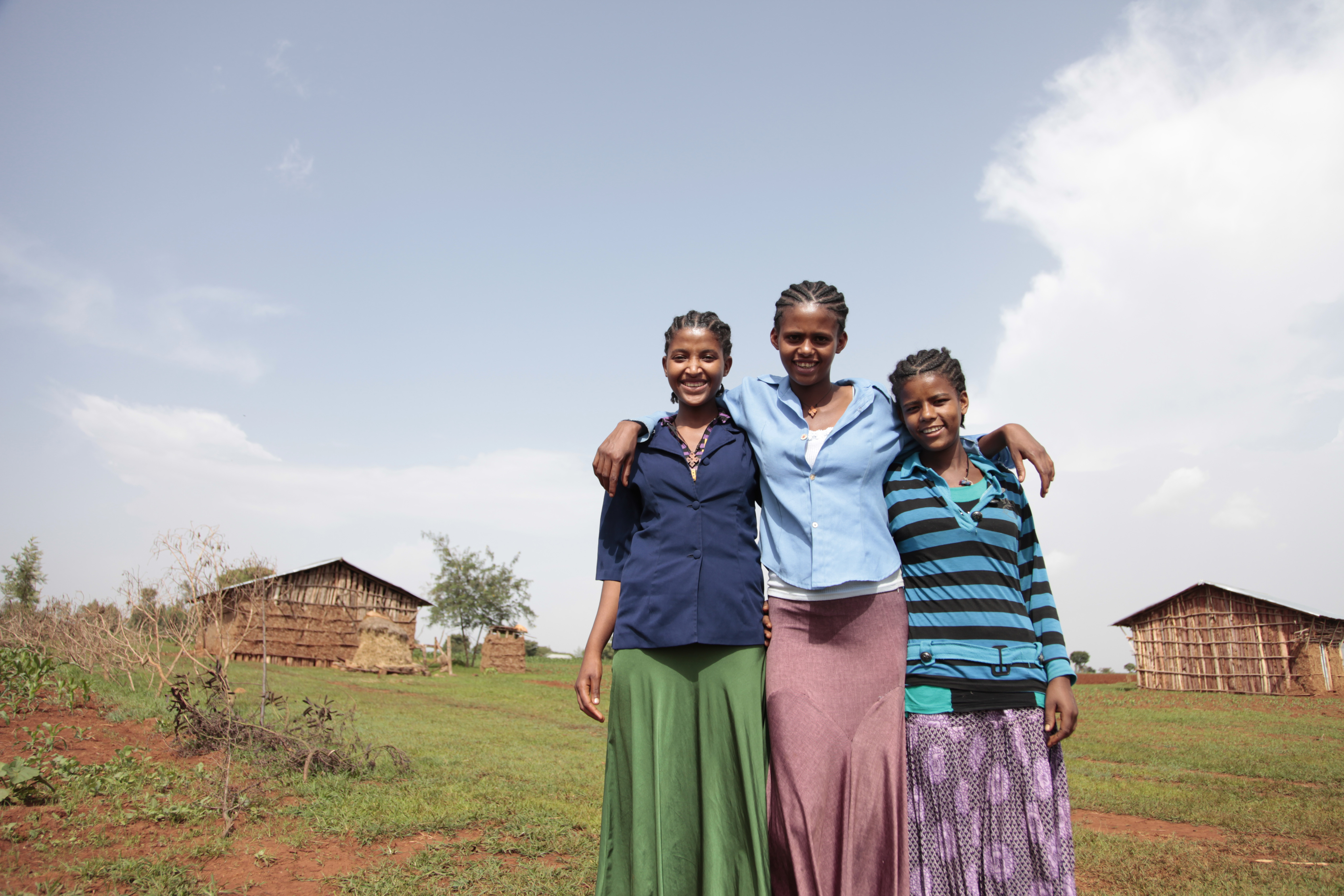
Girls who managed to escape child marriage

The targets and indicators for SDG 5 are extensive and provide equal opportunity for females (women and girls). Targets cover a broad crosscutting gender issues including ending all forms of discrimination against all females everywhere (Target 5.1), violence and exploitation of females (Target 5.2), eliminate practices such as female genital mutilation and forced marriages (Target 5.3), increase value of unpaid care and promote shared domestic responsibilities (Target 5.4), ensure full participation of women in leadership and decision-making (Target 5.5), ensuring access to universal reproductive rights and health (Target 5.6), fostering equal rights to economic resources, property ownership and financial services for women (Target 5.a), promoting empowerment of women through technology (Target 5.b) and adopting, strengthening policies and enforcing legislation for gender equality (Target 5.c).

Indicators represent the metrics by which the world aims to track whether these targets are achieved.

=== Target 5.1: End discrimination against women and girls ===
The first target of SDG 5 is Target 5.1: "End all forms of discrimination against all females everywhere."

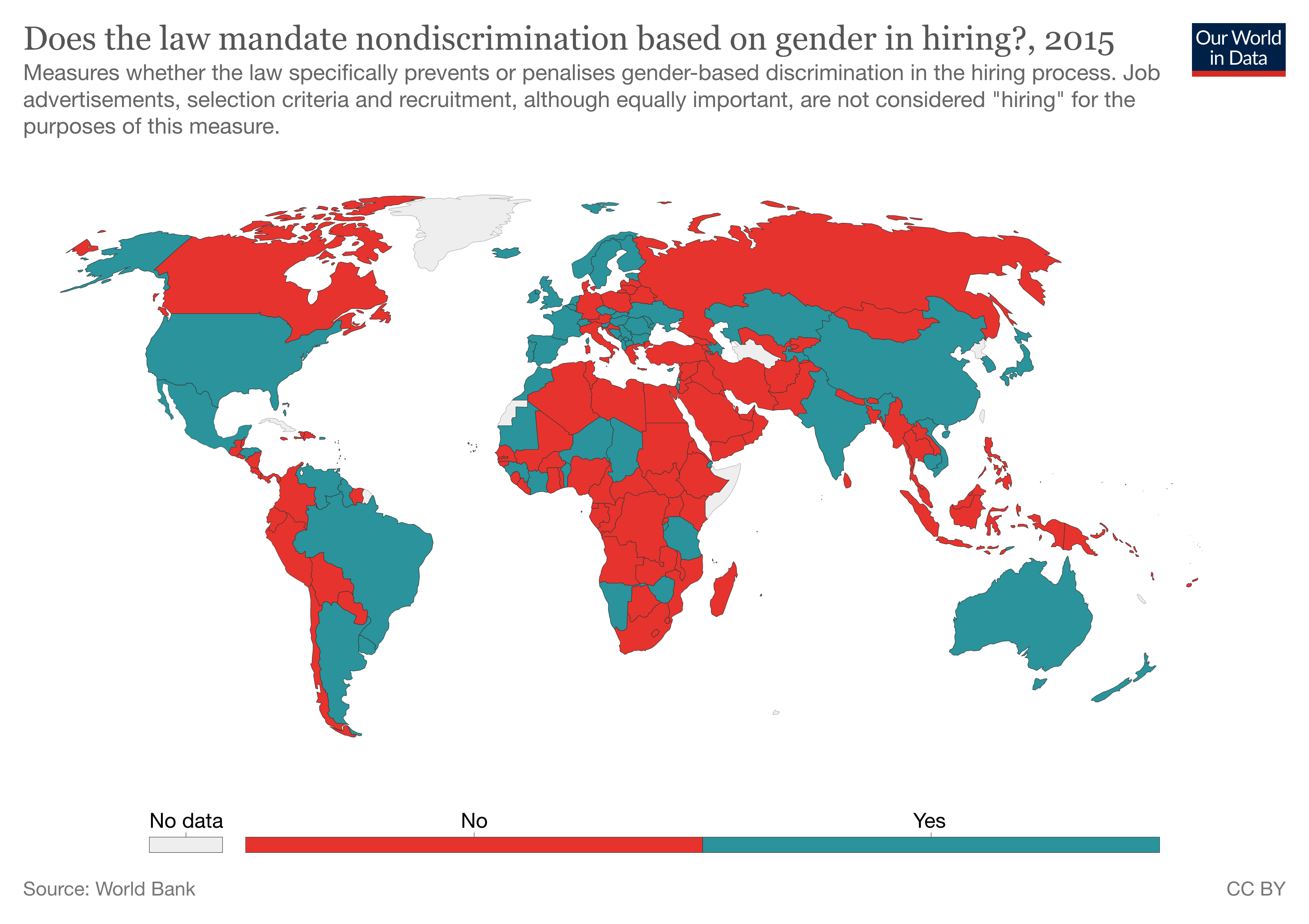
World map for indicator 5.1.1 in 2015 - Share of law mandating nondiscrimination based on gender in hiring

This target has one indicator. Indicator 5.1.1: Whether or not legal frameworks are in place to promote, enforce and monitor equality and non-discrimination on the basis of sex.

This means the indicator works towards the legal frameworks which can be applied to promote and enforce non-discrimination on the basis of sex across various measures including hiring, equal pay, laws against marital rape, and equal rights to property, among others.

Discrimination against women (or sexism) can be measured with a range of indicators such as early marriage, gender-based violence and women's property rights.

Child marriage has declined over the past decades. However, as of July 2025, 19% of women who are 20-24 years old were married before legal adulthood. While the global trend of child marriage is declining, in sub-Saharan Africa, child marriage rates are expected to increase by 2030. Girls from poorer families are more likely to be affected by child marriage than those from wealthier families.

The custodian agencies for Indicator 5.1.1 are UN Women and World Bank.

World map for Indicator 5.2.1 in 2016 - Share of women, older than 14 years, who experienced physical or sexual violence by an intimate partner in the last year

=== Target 5.2: End all violence against and exploitation of women and girls ===
The full title of Target 5.2 is: "Eliminate all forms of violence against all females in the public and private spheres including trafficking, sexual and other types of exploitation."

This target has two indicators:

- Indicator 5.2.1: Proportion of ever-partnered women and girls aged 15 years and older subjected to physical, sexual or psychological violence by a current or former intimate partner in the previous 12 months, by form of violence and by age.
- Indicator 5.2.2: Proportion of women and girls aged 15 years and older subjected to sexual violence by persons other than an intimate partner in the previous 12 months, by age and place of occurrence.

=== Target 5.3: Eliminate forced marriages and genital mutilation ===
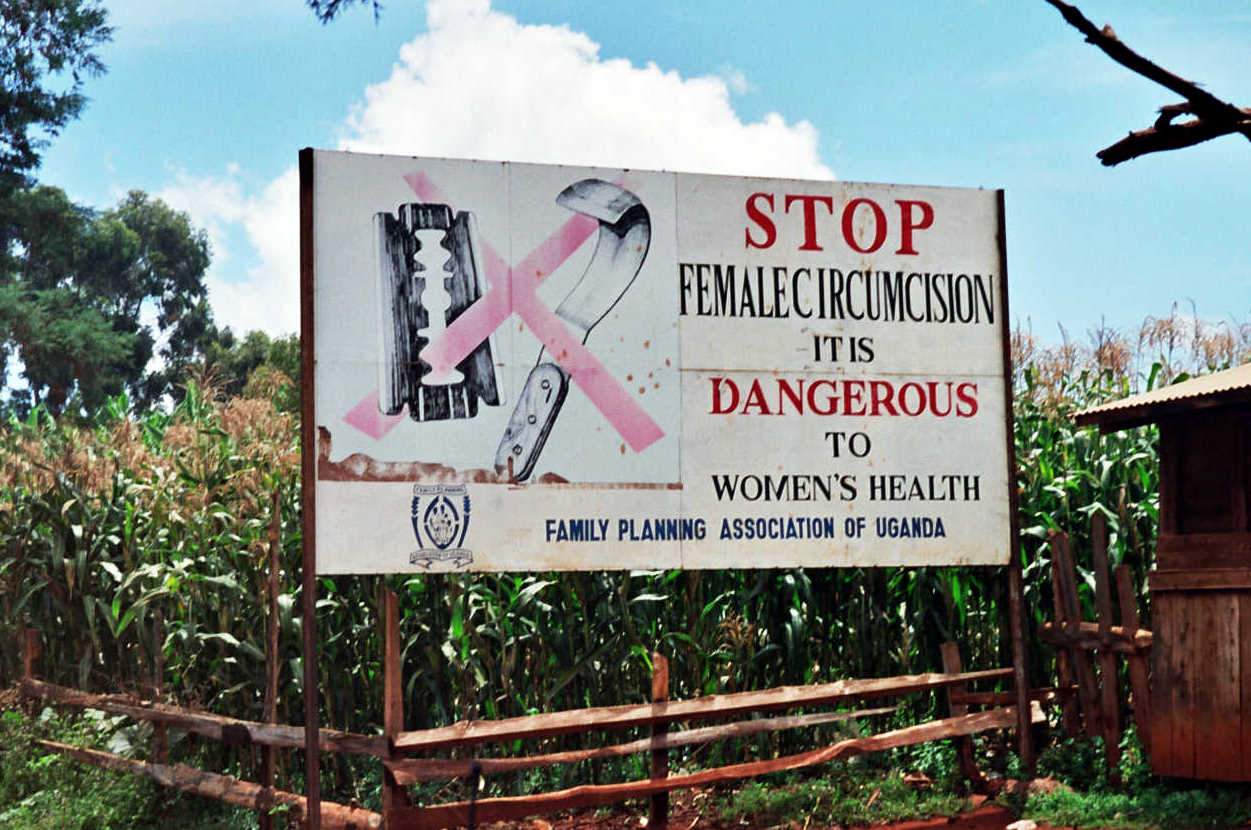
Campaign road sign against female genital mutilation in Uganda

The full title of Target 5.3 is: "Eliminate all harmful practices, such as child, early and forced marriage and female genital mutilation (FGM)". Evidence shows that there is no health benefit in the case of female genital mutilation.

Eliminating harmful practices women are able to live their live full potential lives without any harm.

There are two indicators:

- Indicator 5.3.1: Proportion of women aged 20–24 years who were married or in a union before age 15 and before age 18
- Indicator 5.3.2: Proportion of girls and women aged 15–49 years who have undergone female genital mutilation (FGM) or cutting

According to a progress report in 2020: "At least 200 million girls and women have been subjected to female genital mutilation, according to recent data from the 31 countries where the practice is concentrated. The harmful practice is becoming less common, but progress is not fast enough to meet the global target of its elimination by 2030".

The progress report in 2025 says that "only 38 countries (29 percent cent) establish 18 years as the minimum age of marriage without exceptions and only 63 (48 percent ) countries have rape laws based on lack of consent". Evident progress against child marriage has been made in Southern Asia but countries in sub-saharan Africa are still behind with 31 percent .

In September 2026, the United Nations General Assembly adopted resolution A/RES/80/309, proclaiming 27 November as the International Day for the Elimination of Child, Early and Forced Marriage. The resolution, led by Sierra Leone and co-sponsored by more than 60 Member States including India, is intended to strengthen global efforts to eliminate child, early and forced marriage in support of Target 5.3.

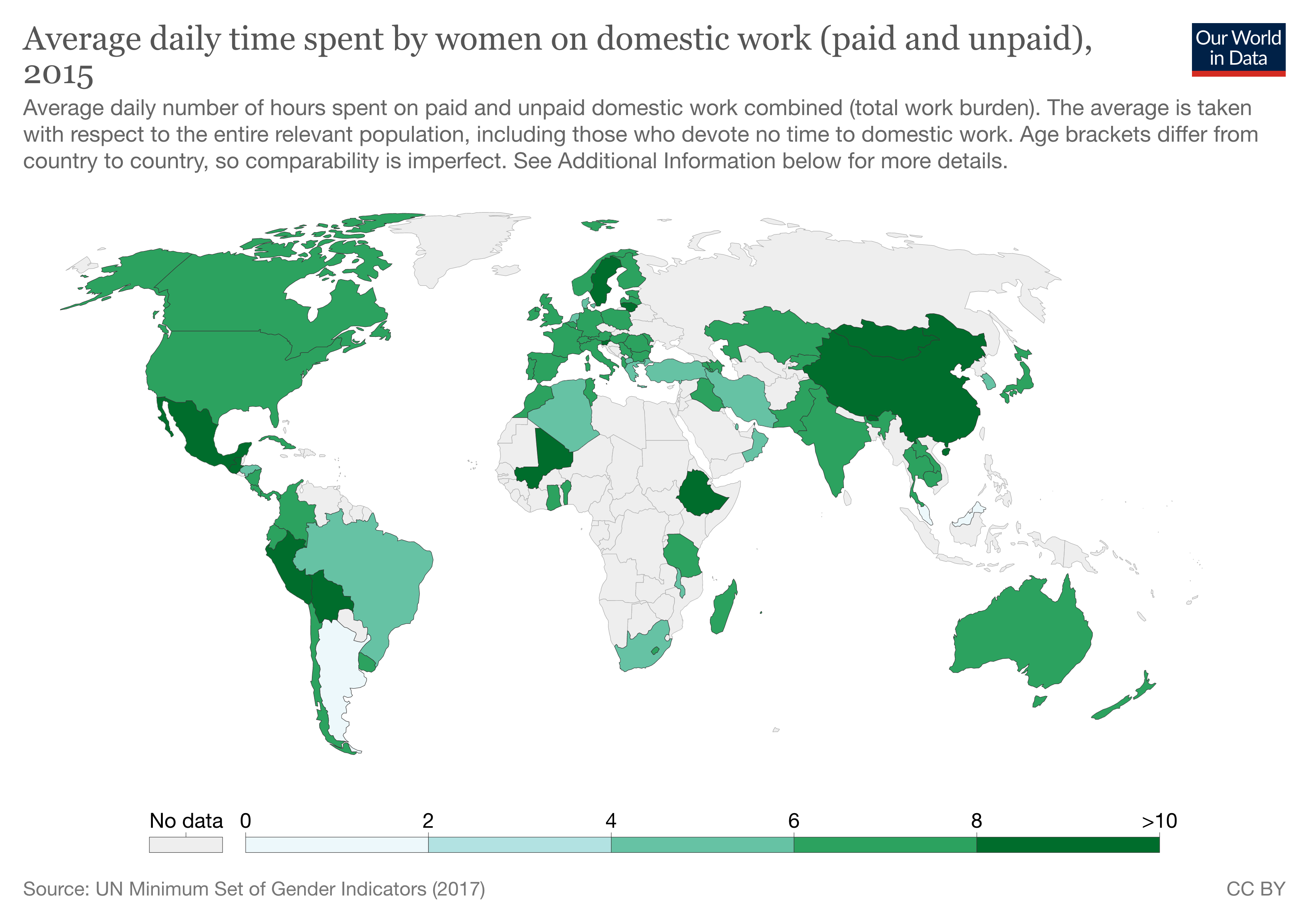
World map for indicator 5.4. 1 in 2015 - Share of average daily time spent by women on domestic work (paid and unpaid)

=== Target 5.4: Value unpaid care and promote shared domestic responsibilities ===
The full title of Target 5.4: "Recognize and value unpaid care and domestic work through the provision of public services, infrastructure and social protection policies and the promotion of shared responsibility within the household and the family as nationally appropriate".

This target has one Indicator: Indicator 5.4.1 is the "Proportion of time spent on unpaid domestic and care work, by sex, age and location".

Unpaid care and domestic work includes cooking and cleaning, fetching water and firewood or taking care of children and the elderly. As of 2025, across the globe, women spend an average of two and a half times the hours as men on domestic work per day. Women in Europe, North America, and Oceana usually spend twice the amount of time as men, while in Northern Africa and Western Asia, women spend up to four times as many hours on domestic work.

=== Target 5.5: Ensure full participation in leadership and decision-making ===
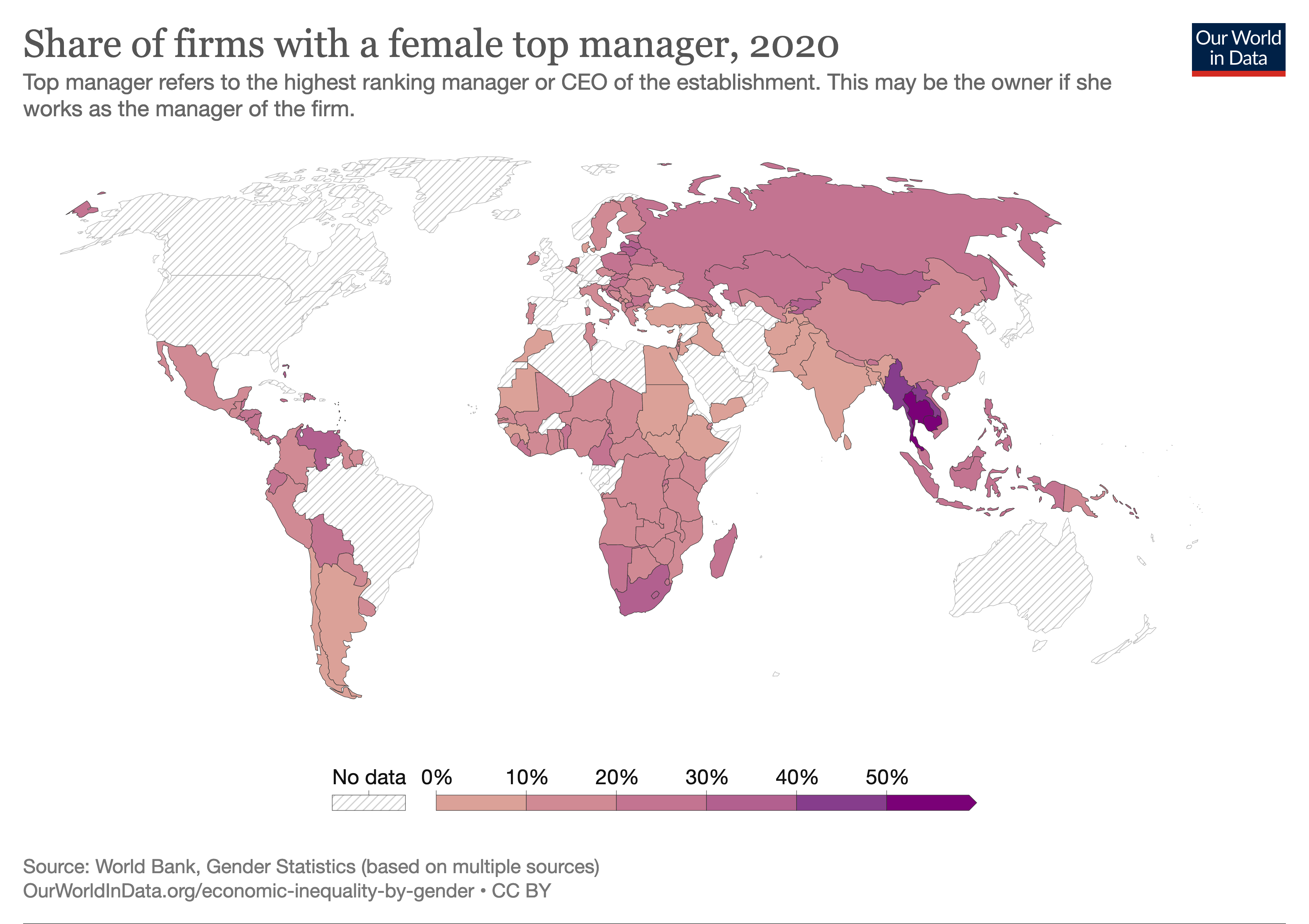
World map for indicator 5.5.2 in 2017 - Sharing percentage of firms with a top female manager

The full title of Target 5.5 is: "Ensure women's full and effective participation and equal opportunities for leadership at all levels of decision-making in political, economic and public life."

Indicators are:

- Indicator 5.5.1: Proportion of seats held by women in (a) national parliaments and (b) local government
- Indicator 5.5.2: Proportion of women in managerial positions

As of 2020, "representation by women in single or lower houses of national parliament reached 25 per cent, up slightly from 22 per cent in 2015". After the elections in several countries in 2024, only 27.7% of parliamentary seats were held by women, and in local governments, women hold 35.5% of seats.

=== Target 5.6: Universal access to reproductive rights and health ===
The full title of Target 5.6 is: "Ensuring universal access to sexual and reproductive health and reproductive rights as agreed in accordance with the Program-me of Action of the International Conference on Population and Development and the Beijing Platform for Action and the outcome documents of their review conferences."

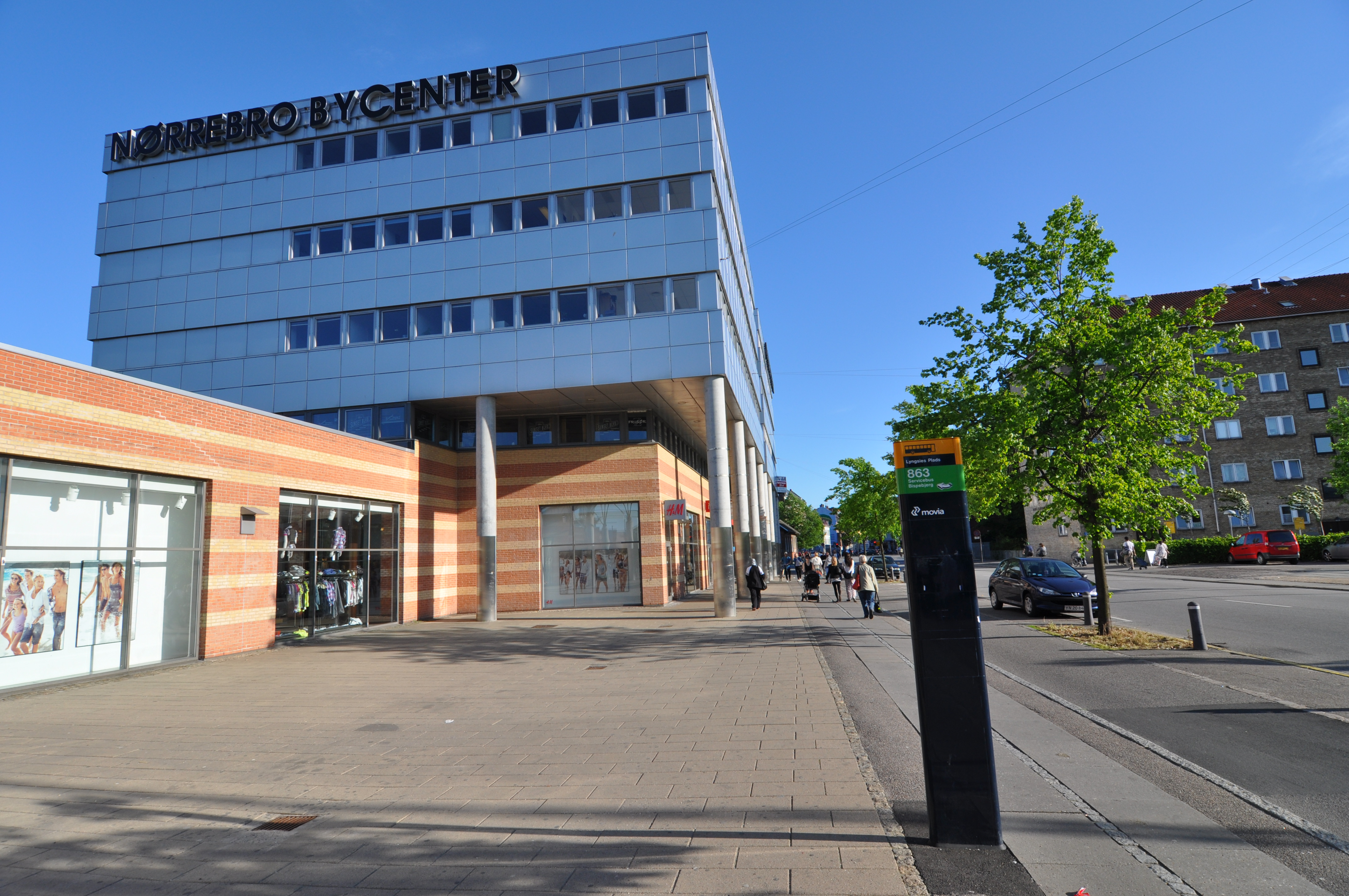
Fertility center in Copenhagen, Denmark

Indicators are:

- Indicator 5.6.1: Proportion of women aged 15–49 years who make their own informed decisions regarding sexual relations, contraceptive use and reproductive health care
- Indicator 5.6.2: Number of countries with laws and regulations that guarantee full and equal access to women and men aged 15 years and older to sexual and reproductive health care, information and education

Only 56.3 percent of married women between 15 to 49 years of age were able to "make their own decisions regarding sexual and reproductive health and rights" There is a big difference in access of reproductive rights and heath in Central and Western Africa compared to countries in Europe, South- Eastern Asia and Latin America and the Caribbean. Data shows that only 36.8 per cent of women in sub-Saharan Africa to 87.2 in Europe have the ability to make decisions regarding their reproductive health.

=== Target 5.7: Equal rights to economic resources, property ownership and financial services ===
The full title of Target 5.a is: "Undertake reforms to give women equal rights to economic resources, as well as access to ownership and control over land and other forms of property, financial services, inheritance and natural resources, in accordance with national laws.".

The two indicators are:

- Indicator 5.a.1: Proportion of total agricultural population with ownership or secure rights over agricultural land, by sex; and (b) share of women among owners or rights-bearers of agricultural land, by type of tenure
- Indicator 5.a.2: Proportion of countries where the legal framework (including customary law) guarantees women's equal rights to land ownership and/or control

Financial systems are important to ensure gender equality. Yet, only 26 per cent of 121 countries and areas have financial mechanisms that track resource allocation for gender equality since 2021 . This still underlines the persistent gap in the commitment for measurable investment to achieve gender equality. As of 2025, out of 84 countries, "58 per cent lack adequate legal protections for women’s land rights across family, inheritance and land laws".

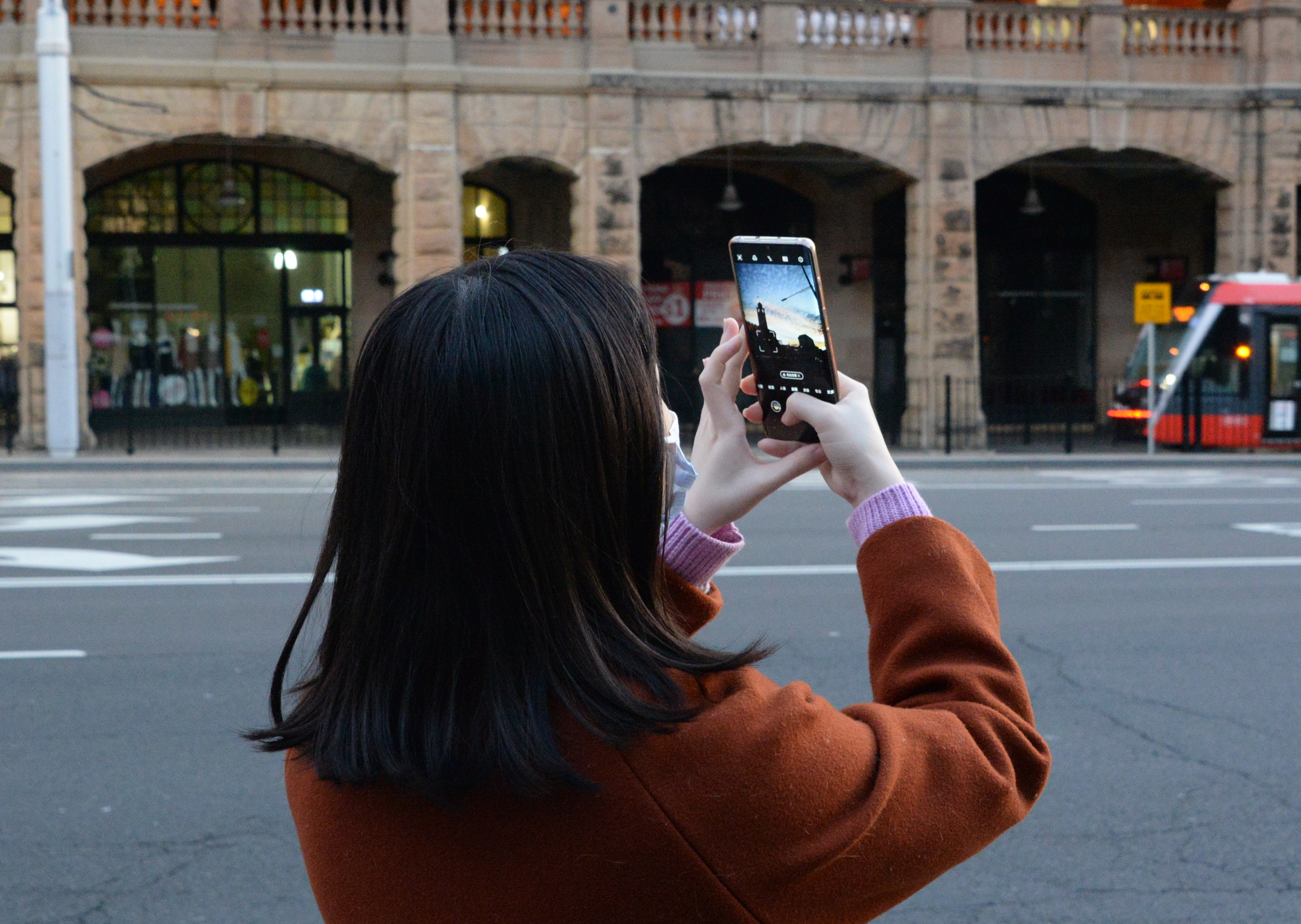
Young woman taking a photo with her mobile phone in Sydney - in 66 countries, having a phone is still luxury for women.

=== Target 5.8: Promote empowerment of women through technology ===
The full title of Target 5.b is: "Enhance the use of enabling technology, in particular information and communications technology, to promote the empowerment of women."

This target has one indicator: Indicator 5.b.1 is the "Proportion of individuals who own a mobile telephone, by sex".

A UN progress report from 2020 stated that: "Empowering women with mobile telephones has been shown to accelerate social and economic development.

There are wide gender gaps in internet access and use. Men are 21% more likely to have internet access than women, rising to 52% in the world's least developed countries. The majority of those offline are women in developing countries, reinforcing gender inequalities. Between 2013 and 2019, the gender gap in online use rose from 11% to 17%. In least-developed countries over the same period, the gap rose from 30% to 43%. In 2024 globally, 77 percent of women owned a mobile phone compared to 82 percent of men causing a gender parity of 0.93 .Due to different other factors the gap becomes bigger in Sub-Saharan Africa, Central and South Asia where the parity score falls under 0.82.

=== Target 5.9: Adopt and strengthen policies and enforceable legislation for gender equality ===
The full title of Target 5.c is: "Adopt and strengthen sound policies and enforceable legislation for the promotion of gender equality and the empowerment of all women and girls at all levels."

This target has one indicator: Indicator 5.c.1 is the "Proportion of countries with systems to track and make public allocations for gender equality and women's empowerment". This indicator shows the government's effort to track budget allocation for gender equality and the availability of financial mechanisms that allocate these resources and make them publicly available..This indicator is evaluated by three criteria : first the willingness of a government to address gender equality and women empowerment (GEWE). The second it examines if the country has systems that manage the allocation of resources . This indicator is evaluated by three criteria : first the willingness of a government to address gender equality and women empowerment (GEWE). The second it examines if the country has systems that manage the allocation of resources. The third criteria assess the transparency of the government by making these publicly available.

=== Custodian agencies ===
Custodian agencies are responsible for monitoring and reporting of indicators:

- Indicator 5.1.1: United Nations Women (UN Women), World Bank (WB), Organization for Economic Cooperation and Development (OECD)
- Indicator 5.2.1 and 5.2.2: United Nations Children's Emergency Fund (UNICEF), UN Women, United Nations Population Fund (UNFPA), World Health Organisation (WHO), United Nations Office on Drugs and Crime (UNODC)
- Indicator 5.3.1 and 5.3.2: United Nations Children's Emergency Fund (UNICEF)
- Indicator 5.4.2.: UNSD, United Nations Women (UN Women)
- Indicator 5.5.1: IPU, United Nations Women (UN Women)
- Indicator 5.5.2: International Labor Organization (ILO)
- Indicator 5.6.1: and 5.6.2 is: United Nations Population Fund (UNFPA)
- Indicator 5.a.1 and 5.a.2: Food and Agriculture Organization (FAO)
- Indicator 5.a.2: Food and Agriculture Organization (FAO)
- Indicator 5.1: International Telecommunication Union (ITU)
- Indicator 5.c.2: UN Women, Organization for Economic Cooperation and Development (OECD)

== Monitoring progress ==
An annual report is prepared by the Secretary-General of the United Nations evaluating the progress towards the Sustainable Development Goals. This is a high-level progress reports for all the SDGs.

According to the 2025 Sustainable Development Goals Progress Report, discrimination, genital mutilation, and female underrepresentation are still very present across the globe. Women still have less access to educational, economic, and political opportunities. In addition, female genital mutilation and child marriage are still evident in many countries in the world.

Out of 121 countries, just over 30 countries are able to monitor the distribution of resources to combat gender-based disparities.

== Challenges ==
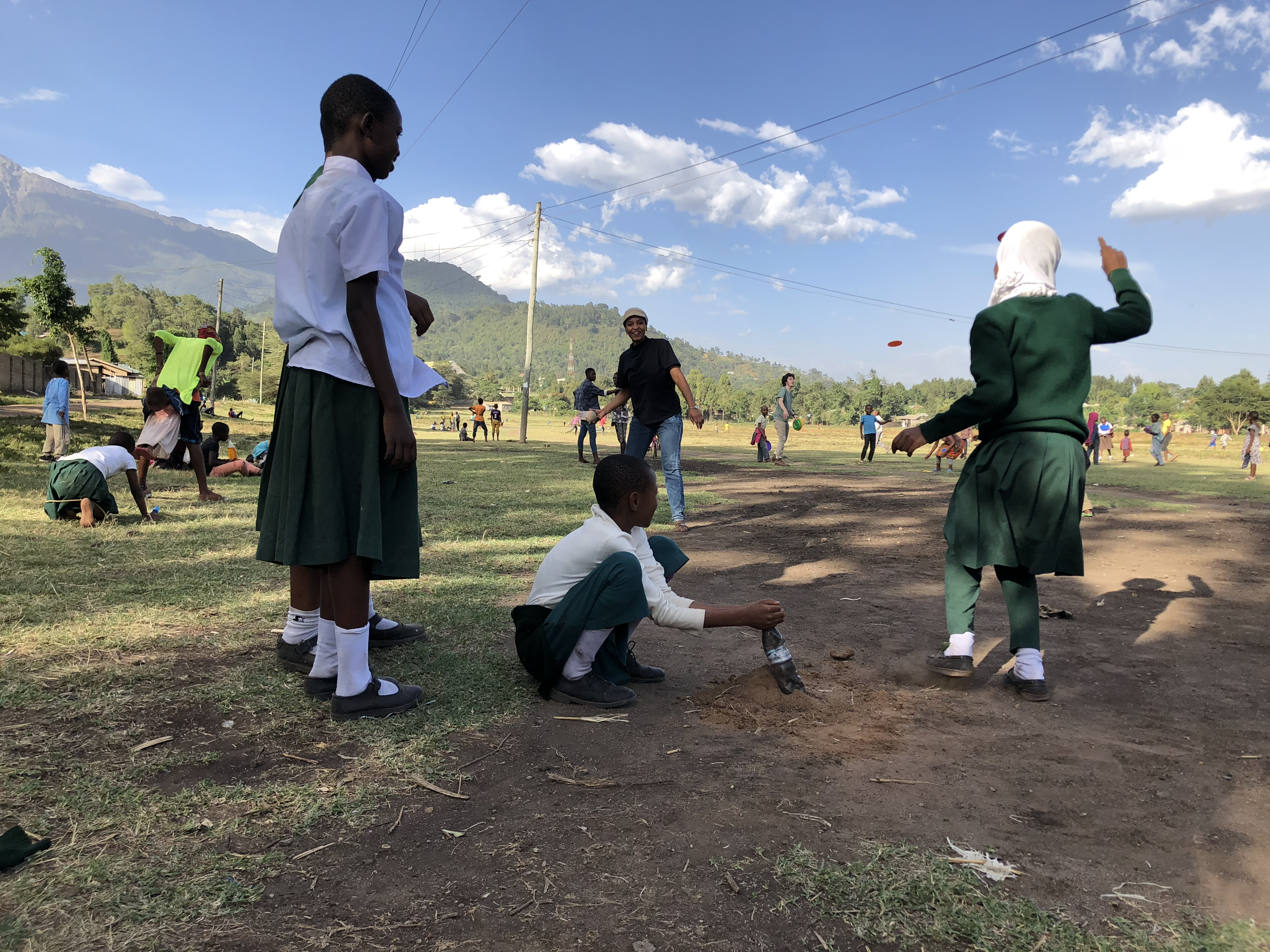
Girls playing during school time - there is still inequality in education

=== Impact of COVID-19 pandemic ===
The COVID-19 pandemic in 2020 also posed a challenge in achieving gender equality. The impact of COVID-19 on women has been significant. Some examples include compounded economic impacts, increased unpaid care work (such as during school closures), an increase in domestic violence and other factors.

The COVID-19 crisis heavily impacted occupations where female employment is more concentrated, causing more job loss for women than men. Fewer women held jobs that were easily adaptable to lockdown conditions, so women faced more unemployment during the COVID-19 pandemic. As a result, women reported more employment loss than men. They also had a higher percentage of dropping out of school for "reasons other than school closures".

Additionally, the closure of daycares and schools disproportionately affected women because of the reliance on women in families to provide child care. Even in marriages where both parents are employed full-time, the mother manages almost 60 percent of child care.

The COVID-19 pandemic has affected women as they are more vulnerable and have reduced access to treatment. Evidence shows there has been an increase in violence against women during the pandemic. During the COVID-19 pandemic, women reported an increase in gender-based violence. In addition, maternal mortality rates increased in several countries, along with rates of stillbirth and domestic abuse.

== Links with other SDGs ==
Even though SDG 5 is a stand-alone goal, other SDGs can only be achieved if SDG 5 is achieved, i.e. the needs of women receive the same attention as the needs of men. The link between SDG 5 and the other SDGs has been extensively analysed by UN Women's report on gender equality in the 2030 agenda for sustainable development.

== Organizations ==
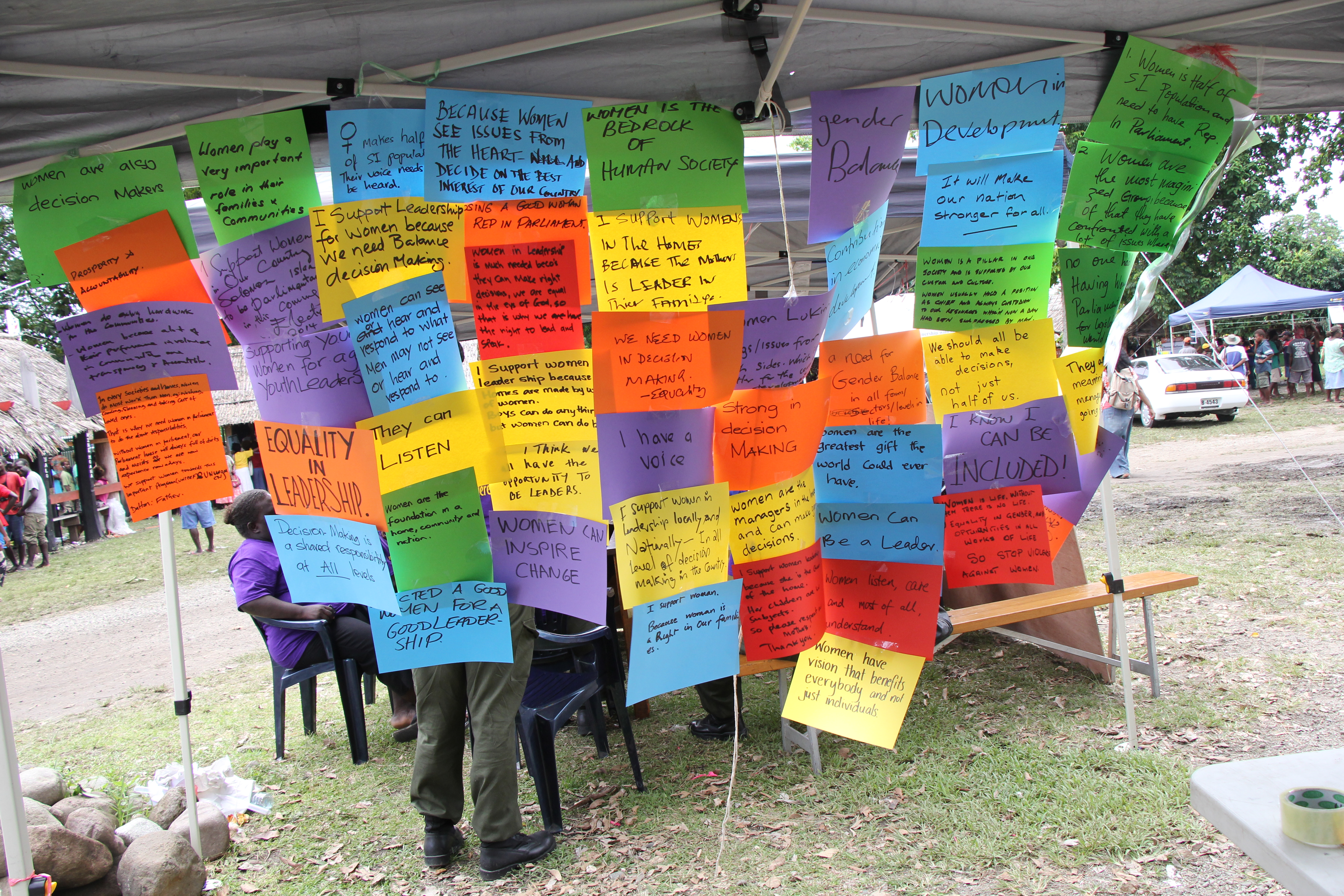
Visitors to the stall finish the sentence "I support women in leadership because…"

Several global organizations have vowed to achieve progress towards SDG 5 in various ways. For example:

- UN Women works for the empowerment of women.
- Equality Now advocates for the protection and promotion of the human rights of women and girls.
- Vital Voices works with women leaders in the areas of economic empowerment, women's political participation, and human rights.
- UNDP works to promote women's participation and leadership in all forms of decision-making.
- UNICEF builds partnerships across the global community to accelerate gender equality.
- WHO is working for a world in which no one misses out on health services because of their gender – or for any other reason.
