= Sustainable Development Goal 12 =

12th of 17 Sustainable Development Goals to ensure responsible consumption and production

SD Goal 12
- Mission statement: "Ensure sustainable consumption and production patterns"
- Commercial?: No
- Type of project: Non-Profit
- Location: Global
- Founder: United Nations
- Established: 2015
- Website: sdgs.un.org

Sustainable Development Goal 12 (SDG 12 or Global Goal 12), titled "responsible consumption and production", is one of the 17 Sustainable Development Goals established by the United Nations in 2015. The official wording of SDG 12 is "Ensure sustainable consumption and production patterns". SDG 12 is meant to ensure good use of resources, improve energy efficiency and sustainable infrastructure, provide access to basic services, create green and decent jobs, and ensure a better quality of life for all. SDG 12 has 11 targets to be achieved by at least 2030, and progress towards the targets is measured using 13 indicators.

Sustainable Development Goal 12 has 11 targets. The first 8 are outcome targets, which are: implement the 10‑Year Framework of Programs on Sustainable Consumption and Production Patterns; achieve the sustainable management and efficient use of natural resources; reducing by half the per capita global food waste at the retail and consumer levels and the reduction of food losses along production and supply chains, including post-harvest losses; achieving the environmentally sound management of chemicals and all wastes throughout their life cycle; reducing waste generation through prevention, reduction, recycling and reuse; encourage companies to adopt sustainable practices; promote public procurement practices that are sustainable; and ensure that people everywhere have the relevant information and awareness for sustainable development. The three means of implementation targets are: support developing countries to strengthen their scientific and technological capacity; develop and implement tools to monitor sustainable development impacts; and remove market distortions, like fossil fuel subsidies, that encourage wasteful consumption.

Countries are working towards the implementation of the "10-Year Framework of Programmes on Sustainable Consumption and Production Patterns".

To ensure that plastic products are more sustainable, thus reducing plastic waste, changes such as decreasing usage and increasing the circularity of the plastic economy are expected to be required. An increase in domestic recycling and a reduced reliance on the global plastic waste trade are other actions that might help meet the goal.

== Background ==
Changes in consumption and production patterns can help to promote the decoupling of economic growth and human well-being from resource use and environmental impact. They can also trigger the transformations envisaged in global commitments on biodiversity, the climate, and sustainable development in general.

== Targets, indicators and progress ==
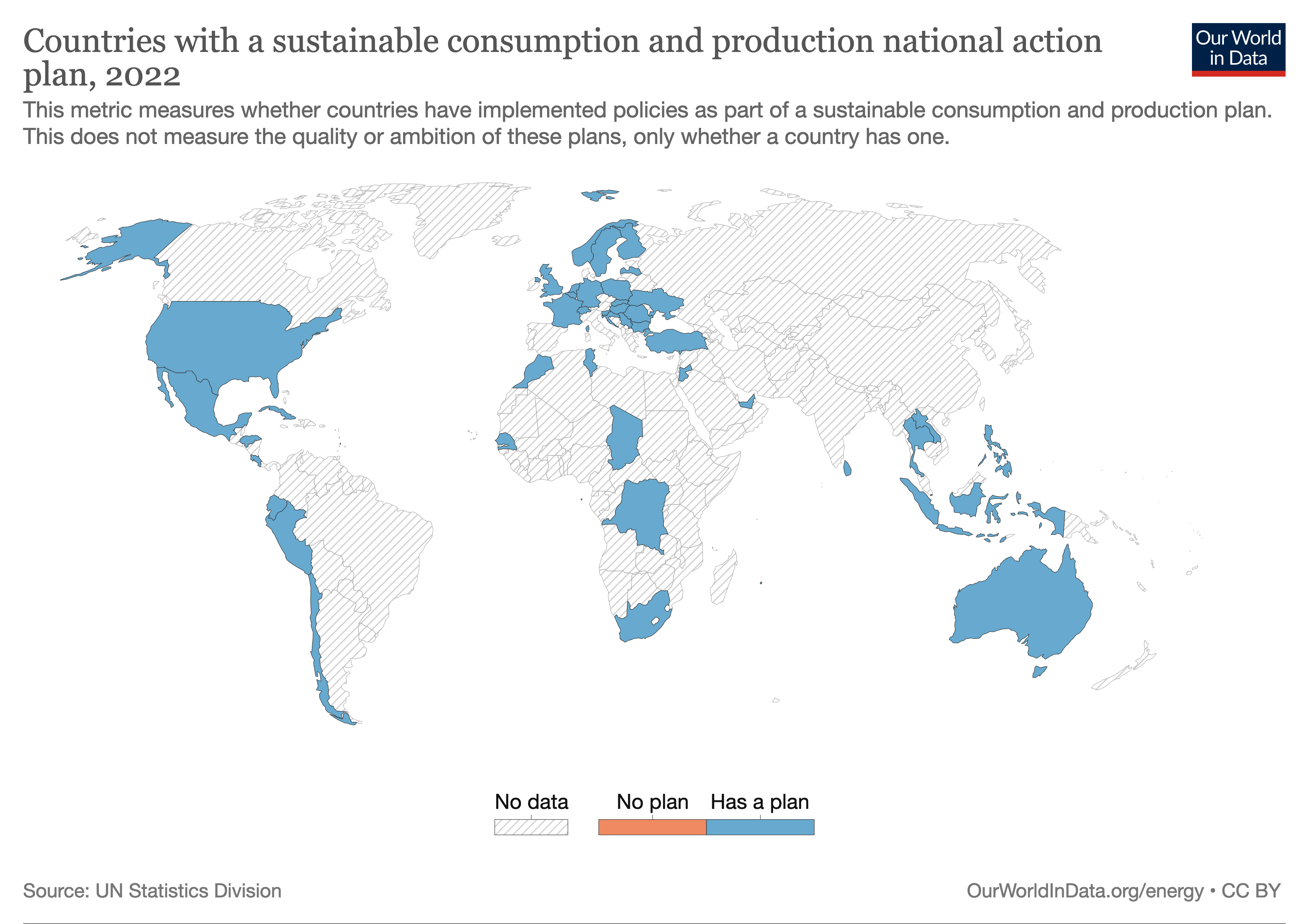
Blue indicates countries that do have a sustainable consumption and production (SCP) national action plan.

SDG 12 has 11 targets. Four of them are to be achieved by the year 2030, one by the year 2020, and six have no target years. The targets address different issues ranging from implementing the 10‑Year Framework of Programmes on Sustainable Consumption and Production Patterns (Target 12.1), achieving the sustainable management and efficient use of natural resources (Target 12.2), having per capita global food waste at the retail and consumer levels (Target 12.3), achieving the environmentally sound management of chemicals and all wastes throughout their life cycle (Target 12.4), substantially reduce waste generation through prevention, reduction, recycling and reuse (Target 12.5), encourage companies to adopt sustainable practices (Target 12.6), promote public procurement practices that are sustainable, in accordance with national policies and priorities (Target 12.7), ensure that people everywhere have the relevant information and awareness for sustainable development (12.8), support developing countries to strengthen their scientific and technological capabilities (Target 12.a), develop and implement tools to monitor sustainable development impacts for sustainable growth (Target 12.b), rationalize inefficient fossil-fuel subsidies that encourage wasteful consumption by removing market distortions (Target 12.c).

=== Target 12.1: Implement the 10-year sustainable consumption and production framework ===
The full title of Target 12.1 is: "Implement the 10‑Year Framework of Programmes on Sustainable Consumption and Production Patterns, all countries taking action, with developed countries taking the lead, taking into account the development and capabilities of developing countries". The goal of this SDG is to have all countries taking the action by 2030.

It has one indicator: Indicator 12.1.1 is the "Number of countries with sustainable consumption and production (SCP) national action plans or SCP mainstreamed as a priority or a target into national policies".

Many countries are working towards the implementation of the "10-Year Framework of Programmes on Sustainable Consumption and Production Patterns".

=== Target 12.2: Sustainable management and use of natural resources ===
The full title of Target 12.2 is: "By 2030, achieve the sustainable management and efficient use of natural resources."

This target has two indicators:

- Indicator 12.2.1: Material footprint, material footprint per capita, and material footprint per GDP
- Indicator 12.2.2: Domestic material consumption, domestic material consumption per capita, and domestic material consumption per GDP
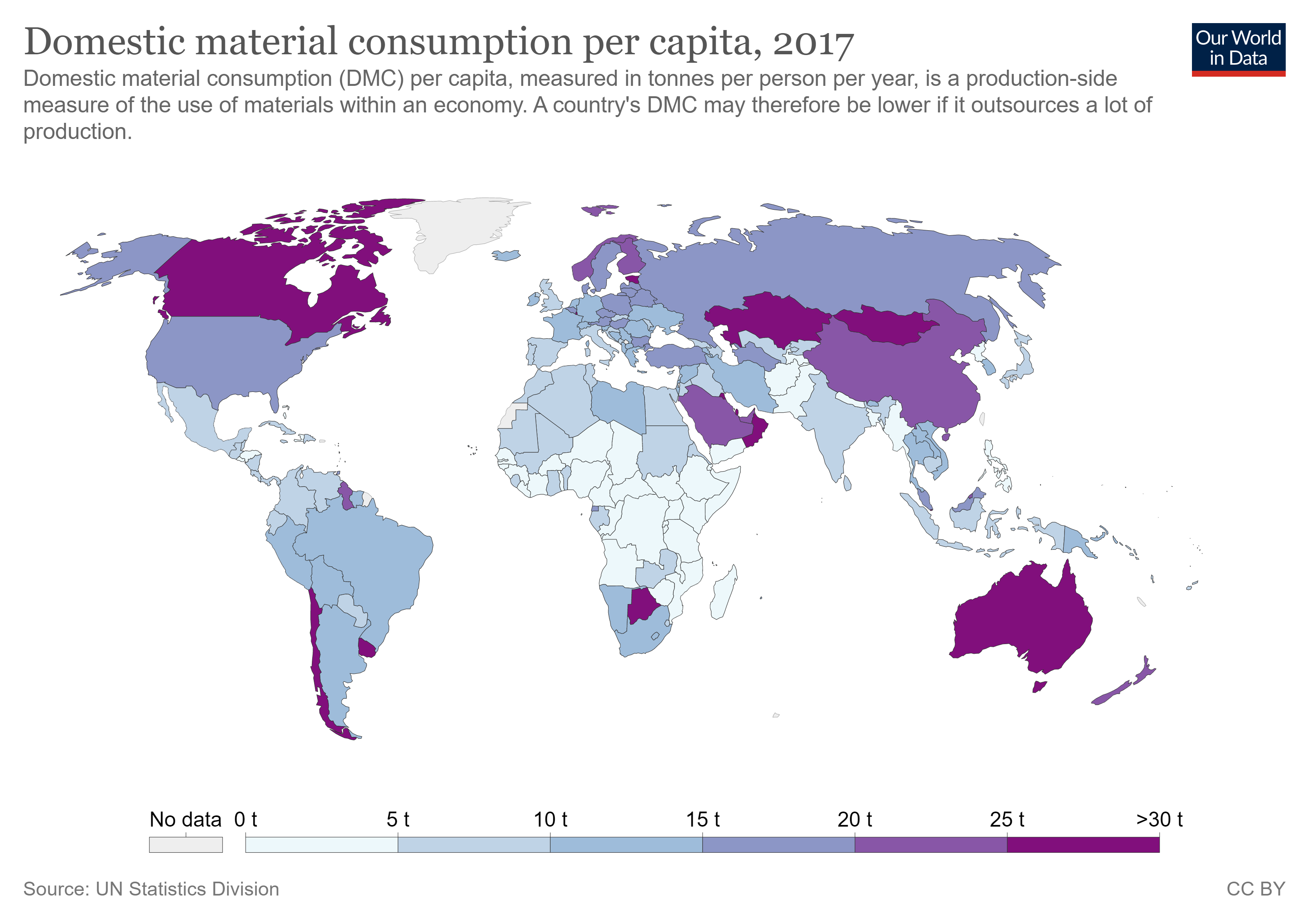
  World map related to Indicator 12.2.2 in 2017. The map shows domestic material consumption, domestic material consumption per capita, and domestic material consumption per GDP.

Material Footprint is the quantity of material extraction that is required to meet the consumption of a country. The sum of material footprint for biomass, fossil fuels, metal ores and non-metal ores is called the total material footprint. Domestic Material Consumption (DMC) is a production-side measure which does not account for supply chain inputs or exports, meaning a country could have a lower DMC value, if it outsources a large proportion of its materials.

A report by the UN in 2020 found that: "Global domestic material consumption per capita rose by 7 per cent, from 10.8 metric tons per capita in 2010 to 11.7 metric tons in 2017, with increases in all regions except Northern America and Africa."

=== Target 12.3: Halve global per capita food waste ===
The full title of Target 12.3 is: "By 2030, halve per capita global food waste at the retail and consumer levels and reduce food losses along production and supply chains, including post-harvest losses." This target has two components (losses and waste) measured by two indicators.

- Indicator 12.3.1.a: Food Loss Index which focuses on losses from production to consumption level
- Indicator 12.3.1.b: Food Waste Index this indicator is a proposal under development

FAO and the United Nations Environment Programme measure progress towards this target.

FAO found that "globally around 14 percent of the world's food is lost from production before reaching the retail level".

=== Target 12.4: Responsible management of chemicals and waste ===
The full title of Target 12.4 is: "By 2020, achieve the environmentally sound management of chemicals and all wastes throughout their life cycle, in accordance with agreed international frameworks, and significantly reduce their release to air, water and soil in order to minimize their adverse impacts on human health and the environment."

This target has two indicators:

- Indicator 12.4.1: Number of parties to international multilateral environmental agreements on hazardous waste, and other chemicals that meet their commitments and obligations in transmitting information as required by each relevant agreement
- Indicator 12.4.2: (a) Hazardous waste generated per capita; and (b) proportion of hazardous waste treated, by type of treatment

Global e-waste generation has grown during 2010 to 2019: from 5.3 kg per capita to 7.3 kg per capita. The "environmentally sound recycling of e-waste" also increased: from 0.8 kg per capita to 1.3 kg per capita.

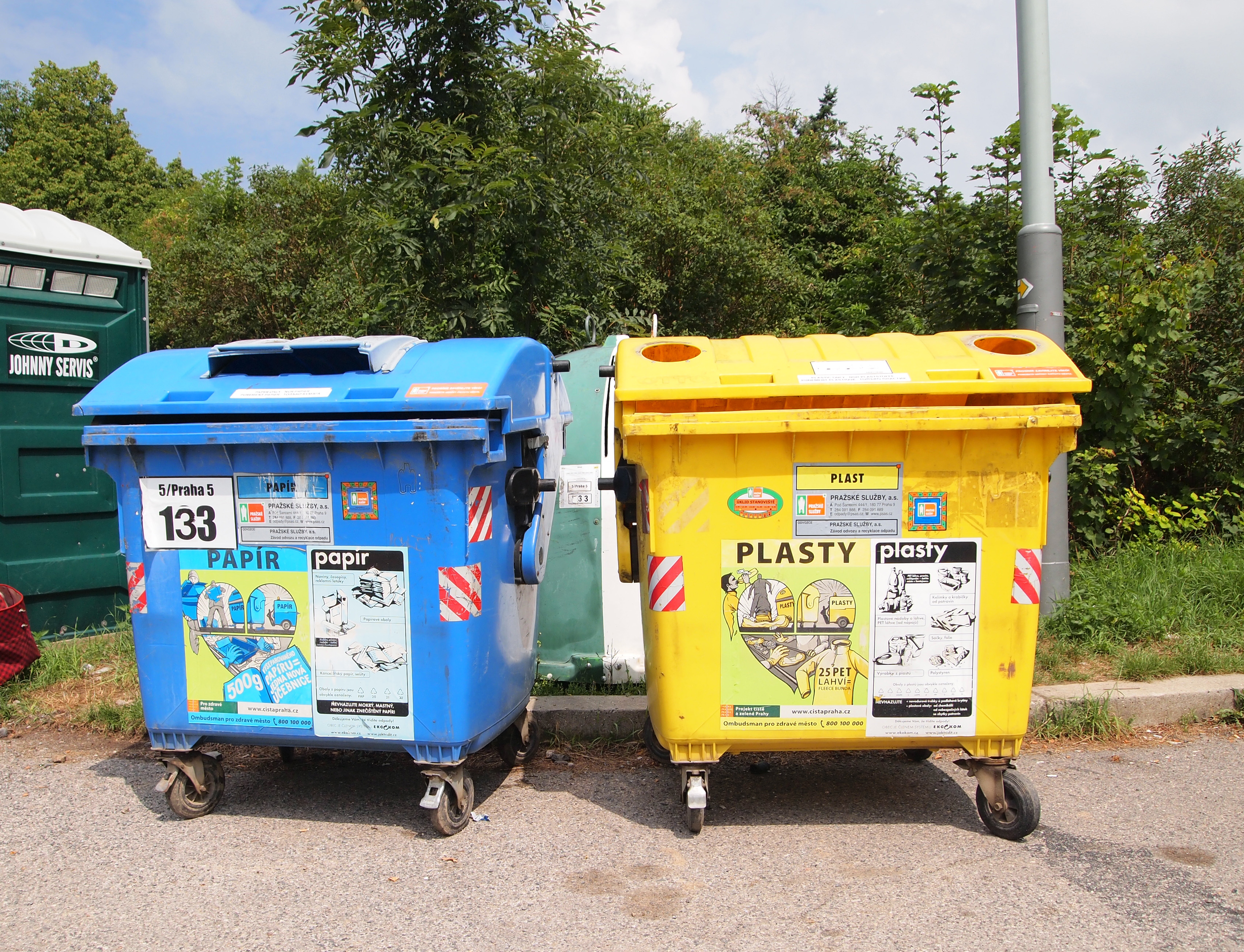
Recycling trash bins in the Czech republic

=== Target 12.5: Substantially reduce waste generation ===
Per capita plastic waste generation, 2015

The full title of Target 12.5 is: "By 2030, substantially reduce waste generation through prevention, reduction, recycling and reuse."

It has one indicator: Indicator 12.5.1 is the "National recycling rate, tons of material recycled".

Every year, about one third of all food produce goes bad. This is worth about $1 trillion a year. The food spoils due to consumers, and goes bad during transportation.

=== Target 12.6: Encourage companies to adopt sustainable practices and sustainability reporting ===
The full title of Target 12.6 is: "Encourage companies, especially large and transnational companies, to adopt sustainable practices and to integrate sustainability information into their reporting cycle."

It has one indicator: Indicator 12.6.1 is the "Number of companies publishing sustainability reports".

World map for Indicator 12.5.1: Municipal waste recycling rate

=== Target 12.7: Promote sustainable public procurement practices ===
The full title of Target 12.7 is: "Promote public procurement practices that are sustainable, in accordance with national policies and priorities."

It has one indicator: Indicator 12.7.1 is the "Degree of sustainable public procurement policies and action plan implementation". Three objectives, SPP, GPP and SRPP, all figure in the indicator:

- SPP: Sustainable public procurement
- GPP: Green public procurement
- SRPP: Socially responsible public procurement.

One of the limitations noted for this indicator is that different countries may implement and measure these objectives in different ways.

=== Target 12.8: Promote universal understanding of sustainable lifestyles ===
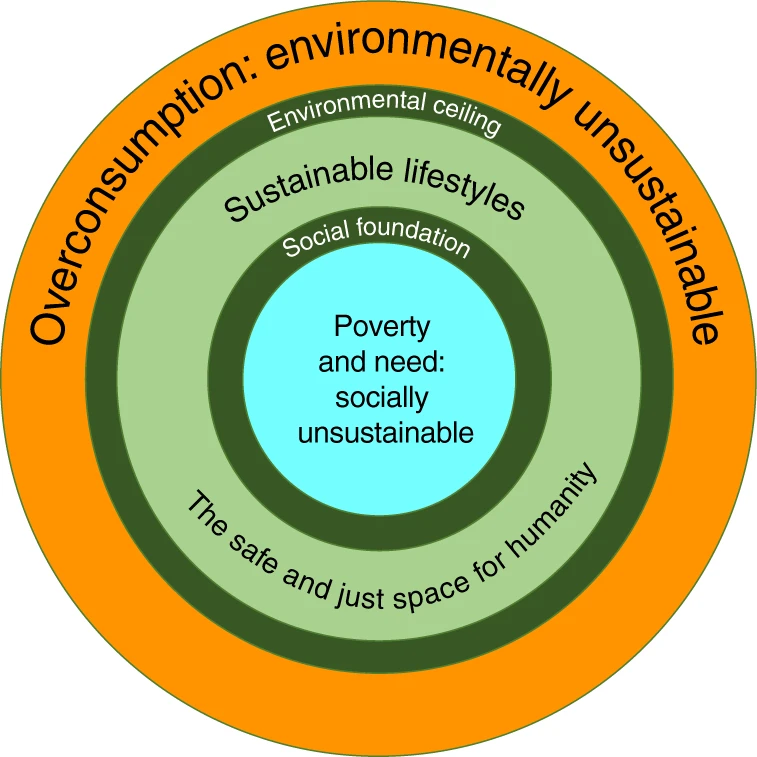
The safe and just space for humanity. Sustainable lifestyles are situated between an upper limit of permissible use ("Environmental ceiling") and a lower limit of necessary use of environmental resources ("Social foundation").

The full title of Target 12.8 is" By 2030, ensure that people everywhere have the relevant information and awareness for sustainable development and lifestyles in harmony with nature."

It has one indicator: Indicator 12.8.1 is the "Extent to which (i) global citizenship education and (ii) education for sustainable development are mainstreamed in (a) national education policies; (b) curricula; (c) teacher education; and (d) student assessment".

=== Target 12.a: Support developing countries' scientific and technological capacity for sustainable consumption and production ===
The full title of Target 12.a is: "Support developing countries to strengthen their scientific and technological capacity to move towards more sustainable patterns of consumption and production."

It has one indicator: Indicator 12.a.1 is the "Installed renewable energy-generating capacity in developing countries (in watts per capita)".

=== Target 12.b: Develop and implement tools to monitor sustainable tourism ===
The full title of Target 12.b is: "Develop and implement tools to monitor sustainable development impacts for sustainable tourism that creates jobs and promotes local culture and products."

It has one indicator: Indicator 12.b.1 is the "Implementation of standard accounting tools to monitor the economic and environmental aspects of tourism sustainability".

=== Target 12.c: Remove market distortions that encourage wasteful consumption ===
The full title of Target 12.c is: "Rationalize inefficient fossil-fuel subsidies that encourage wasteful consumption by removing market distortions in accordance with national circumstances, including restructuring taxation and phasing out those harmful subsidies where they exist, to reflect their environmental impacts, taking fully into account the specific needs and conditions of developing countries and minimizing the possible adverse impacts on their development in a manner that protects the poor and the affected communities."

It has one indicator: Indicator 12.c.1 is the: "(a) Amount of fossil-fuel subsidies as a percentage of GDP; and (b) amount of fossil fuel subsidies as a proportion of the total national expenditure on fossil fuels".

Global fossil fuel subsidies in 2018 were $400 billion. This was double the subsidies for renewable energy.

=== Custodian agencies ===
Custodian agencies are in charge of reporting on the following indicators:

- Indicators 12.1.1, 12.2.1, 12.2.2, 12.7.1 and 12.c.1: United Nations Environmental Programme (UNEP)
- Indicator 12.3.1: Food and Agriculture Organization (FAO) and United Nations Environmental Programme (UNEP)
- Indicator 12.4.1: United Nations Environment Programme (UNEP)
- Indicator 12.4.2: United Nations Environment Programme (UNEP) and Department of Economic and Social Affairs-Statistics Division (DESA/UNSD)
- Indicator 12.5.1: United Nations Environment Programme (UNEP) and the United Nations Statistics Division (UNSD)
- Indicator 12.6.1: United Nations Conference on Trade and Development (UNCTAD) and the UN Environment (United Nations Environment Programme/UNEP)
- Indicator 12.8.1: UNESCO Institute for Statistics (UNESCO-UIS) and the UNESCO Education Sector, Division for Peace and Sustainable Development, Section of Education for Sustainable Development (UNESCO-ED/PSD/ESD)
- Indicator 12.a.1: International Renewable Energy Agency (IRENA).
- Indicator 12.b.1: United Nations World Tourism Organization (UNWTO).

== Progress ==
An annual report is prepared by the Secretary-General of the United Nations, which evaluates the progress towards all the Sustainable Development Goals.

== Challenges ==
Fossil fuel subsidies rose drastically in 2021, to levels last seen in 2014 before the SDGs were adopted, due to governments' responses to the COVID-19 pandemic. They are projected to rise even further due to the Russian invasion of Ukraine disrupting energy supply chains.

The COVID-19 pandemic also impaired reporting of data regarding initiatives on sustainable tourism.

== Links with other SDGs ==
SDG 12 has targets related to SDG 2, SDG 3, SDG 4, SDG 8, SDG 9, SDG 13, SDG 14 and SDG 15.

== Organizations ==
- United Nations Environment Programme (UNEP)
- Department of Economic and Social Affairs-Statistics Division (DESA/UNSD)
- Food and Agriculture Organization (FAO)
- United Nations World Tourism Organization (UNWTO)
- UNESCO Institute for Statistics (UNESCO-UIS)
- UNESCO Education Sector, Division for Peace and Sustainable Development, Section of Education for Sustainable Development (UNESCO-ED/PSD/ESD)
- United Nations Conference on Trade and Development (UNCTAD)
- United Nations Statistics Division (UNSD)
- United Nations University
