= Sustainable Development Goal 8 =

Global goal to promote decent work and economic growth by 2030

Sustainable Development Goal
- Mission statement: "Promote sustained, inclusive and sustainable economic growth, full and productive employment and decent work for all"
- Commercial?: No
- Type of project: Non-Profit
- Location: Global
- Founder: United Nations
- Established: 2015
- Website: sdgs.un.org

Sustainable Development Goal 8 (SDG 8 or Global Goal 8) is about "decent work and economic growth" and is one of the 17 Sustainable Development Goals which were established by the United Nations General Assembly in 2015. The full title is to "Foster sustained, inclusive and sustainable economic growth, full and productive employment and decent work for all." Progress towards targets will be measured, monitored and evaluated by 17 indicators.

SDG 8 has twelve targets in total to be achieved by 2030. Some targets are for 2030; others are for 2020. The first ten are outcome targets. These are; "sustainable economic growth; diversify, innovate and upgrade for economic productivity", "promote policies to support job creation and growing enterprises", "improve resource efficiency in consumption and production", 'full employment and decent work with equal pay', 'promote youth employment, education and training', 'end modern slavery, trafficking, and child labour', 'protect labour rights and promote safe working environments', 'promote beneficial and sustainable tourism', universal access to banking, insurance and financial services. In addition, there are also two targets for means of implementation, which are: Increase aid for trade support; develop a global youth employment strategy.

For the least developed countries, the economic target is to attain at least a 7 percent annual growth in Gross Domestic Product (GDP). In 2018, the global growth rate of real GDP per capita was 2 per cent.

Over the past five years, economic growth in least developed countries has been increasing at an average rate of 4.3 per cent. In 2019, 22 per cent of the world's young people were not in employment, education or training.

== Background ==
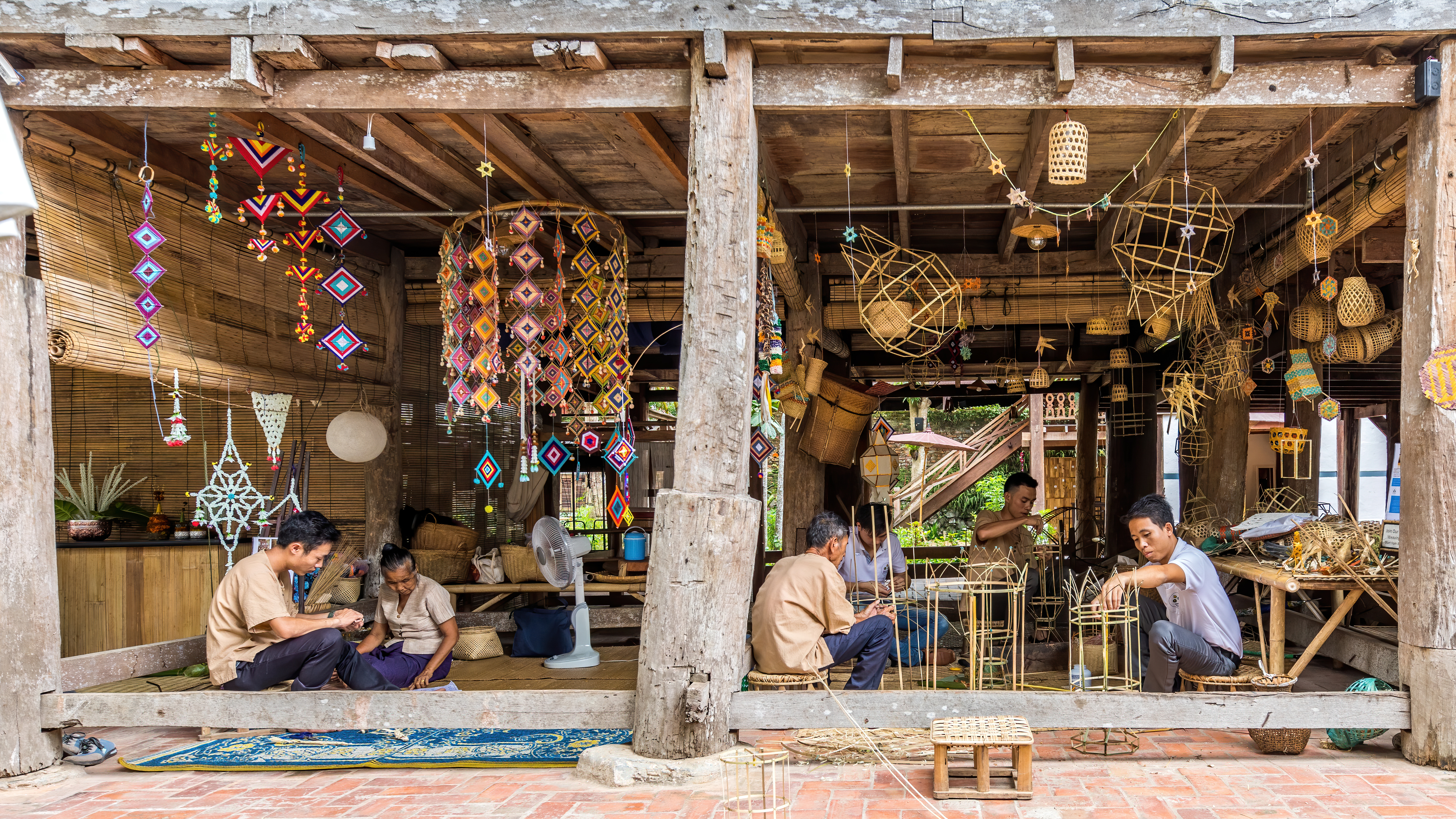
Craftmen at work, bamboo basket weaving and textile mobile sculptures, in Heuan Chan heritage house, Luang Prabang, Laos

For close to three decades, the number of workers living in extreme poverty has reduced drastically. This is despite the impact of the 2008 financial crisis and Great Recession. In developing countries, 34% of total employments were for the middle class, a number that increased rapidly between 1991 and 2015.

Employment growth since 2008 has "averaged only 0.1% annually, compared with 0.9% between 2000 and 2007".

SDG 8 aims at fostering sustainable and equitable economic growth for all workers, irrespective of their background, race or gender. This means achieving "higher levels of economic productivity through product diversification, technological upgrading and innovation, including through a focus on high-value added and labour-intensive sectors."

== Targets, indicators and progress ==
The UN has defined the 12 Targets and 17 Indicators for SDG 8. The 12 Targets specify the goals and Indicators represent the metrics by which the world aims to track whether these targets are achieved by using the years stated and documented for the indicators actualisation. Two of the indicators are to be achieved by the year 2020, one by the year 2025, and the remaining fourteen indicators are to be achieved by 2030.

=== Target 8.1: Sustainable economic growth ===
Annual growth rate of real GDP per capita 2025: Below -3 -3 to -2 -2 to -1 -1 to 0 0 to 1 / 1 to 2 2 to 3 3 to 4 4 to 5 above 5 No data

The full title of Target 8.1 is: "Sustain per capita economic growth in accordance with national circumstances and, in particular, at least 7 per cent gross domestic product growth per annum in the least developed countries".

It has one indicator: Indicator 8.1.1 is the "Annual growth rate of real GDP per capita".

Achieving higher productivity will require diversification and upgraded technology along with innovation, entrepreneurship, and the growth of small- and medium-sized enterprises (SMEs).

In 2018, the global growth rate of real GDP per capita was 2 per cent.

=== Target 8.2: Diversify, innovate and upgrade for economic productivity ===
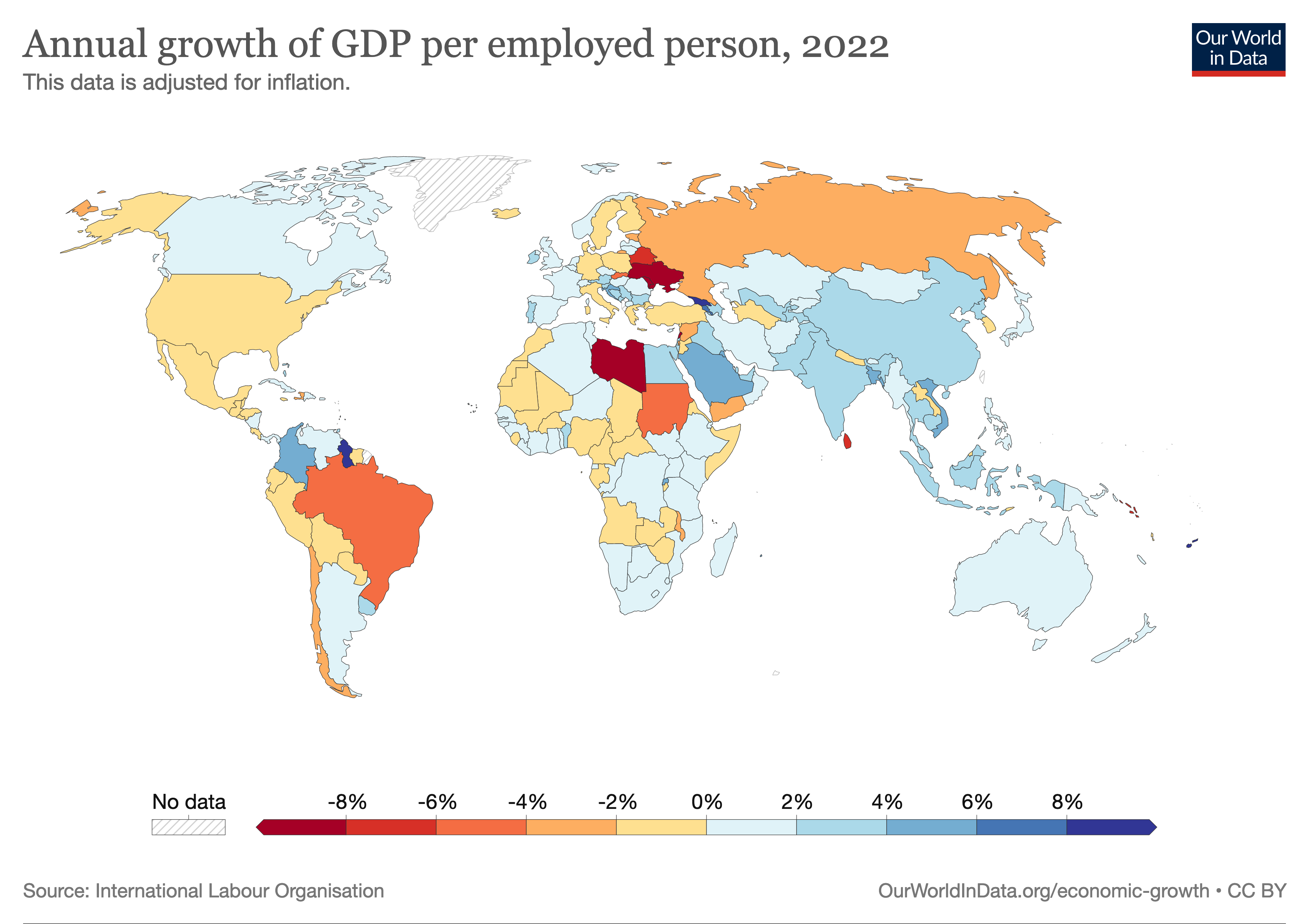
World map for Indicator 8.2.1: Annual growth rate of real GDP Per Employed

The official wording for Target 8.2 is: "Achieve higher levels of economic productivity through diversification, technological upgrading and innovation, including through a focus on high-value added and labour-intensive sectors."

It has one indicator: Indicator 8.2.1 is the "Annual growth rate of real GDP per employed person".

A large portion of North America (Canada and the United States) had an average 0.5% increase in GDP per employed person, but overall, the continent had an approximate -0.53% decrease in productivity. South America had an overall decrease in GDP per employed person, with Venezuela experiencing the largest change at -31.8%. The continent overall met an approximate -2.56% decrease in productivity.

Asia had an overall increase in GDP per employed person. It had an approximate 2.1% increase in GDP per employed person with a large portion (China) seeing a 6.6% increase. Europe had an overall increase in GDP per employed person. It had an approximate 1.3% increase with a large portion (Russia) seeing a 2.5% increase. Africa had an overall increase in GDP per employed person. It had an approximate 0.4% increase. Oceania had an overall increase in GDP per employed person. It had an approximate 0.85% increase with a large portion (Australia) seeing a 0.2% increase.

=== Target 8.3: Promote policies to support job creation and growing enterprises ===
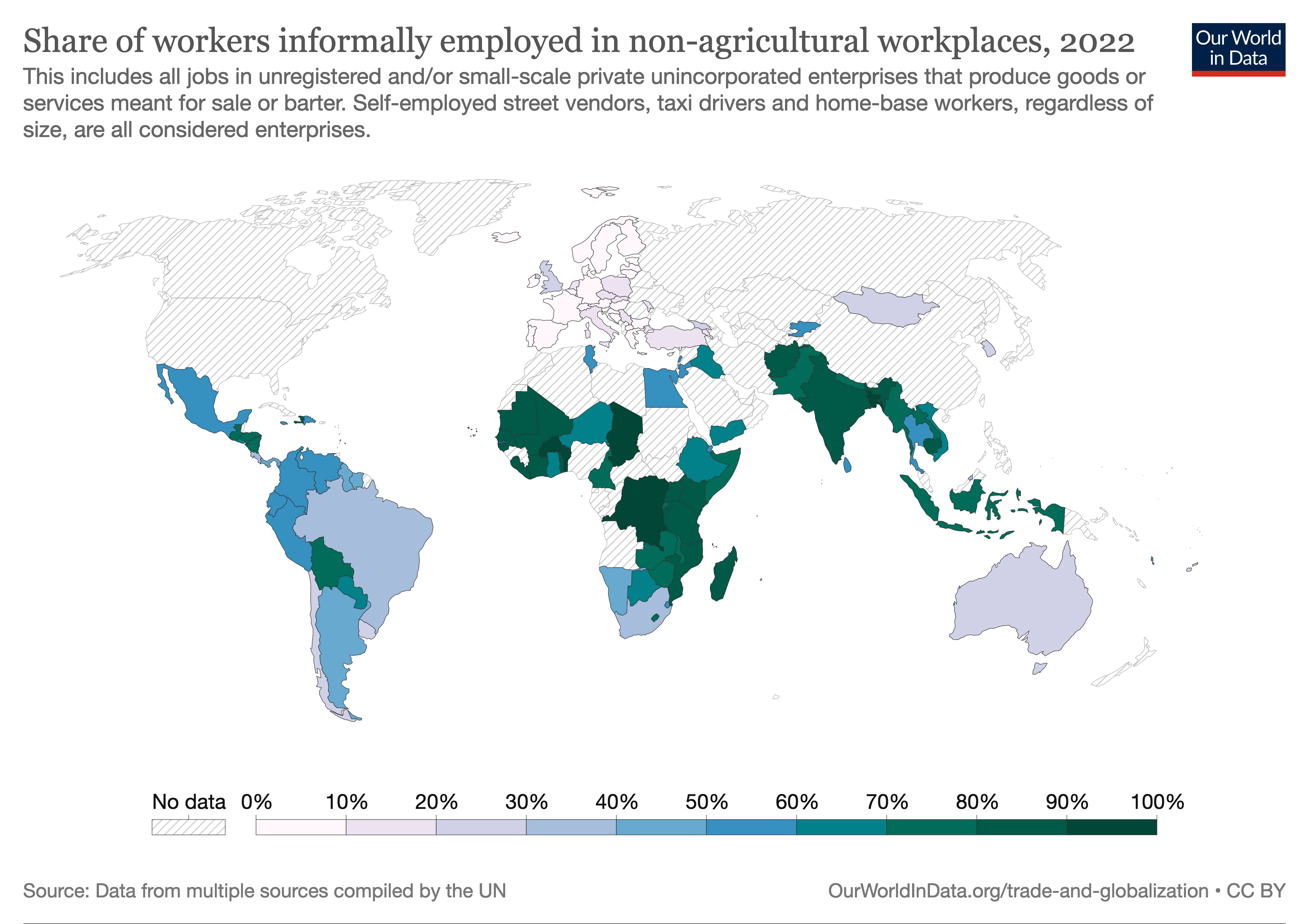
World map for Indicator 8.3.1 Informal employment, 2017

The official wording for Target 8.3 is: "Promote development-oriented policies that support productive activities, decent job creation, entrepreneurship, creativity and innovation."

It has one indicator: Indicator 8.3.1 is the "Proportion of informal employment in non-agriculture employment, by sex".

Jobs that fall under the Informal employment in non-agricultural employment include; unregistered and/or small-scale private unincorporated enterprises engaged in the production of goods or services meant for sale or barter, self-employed street vendors, taxi drivers and home-base workers, irrespective of size.

=== Target 8.4: Improve resource efficiency in consumption and production ===
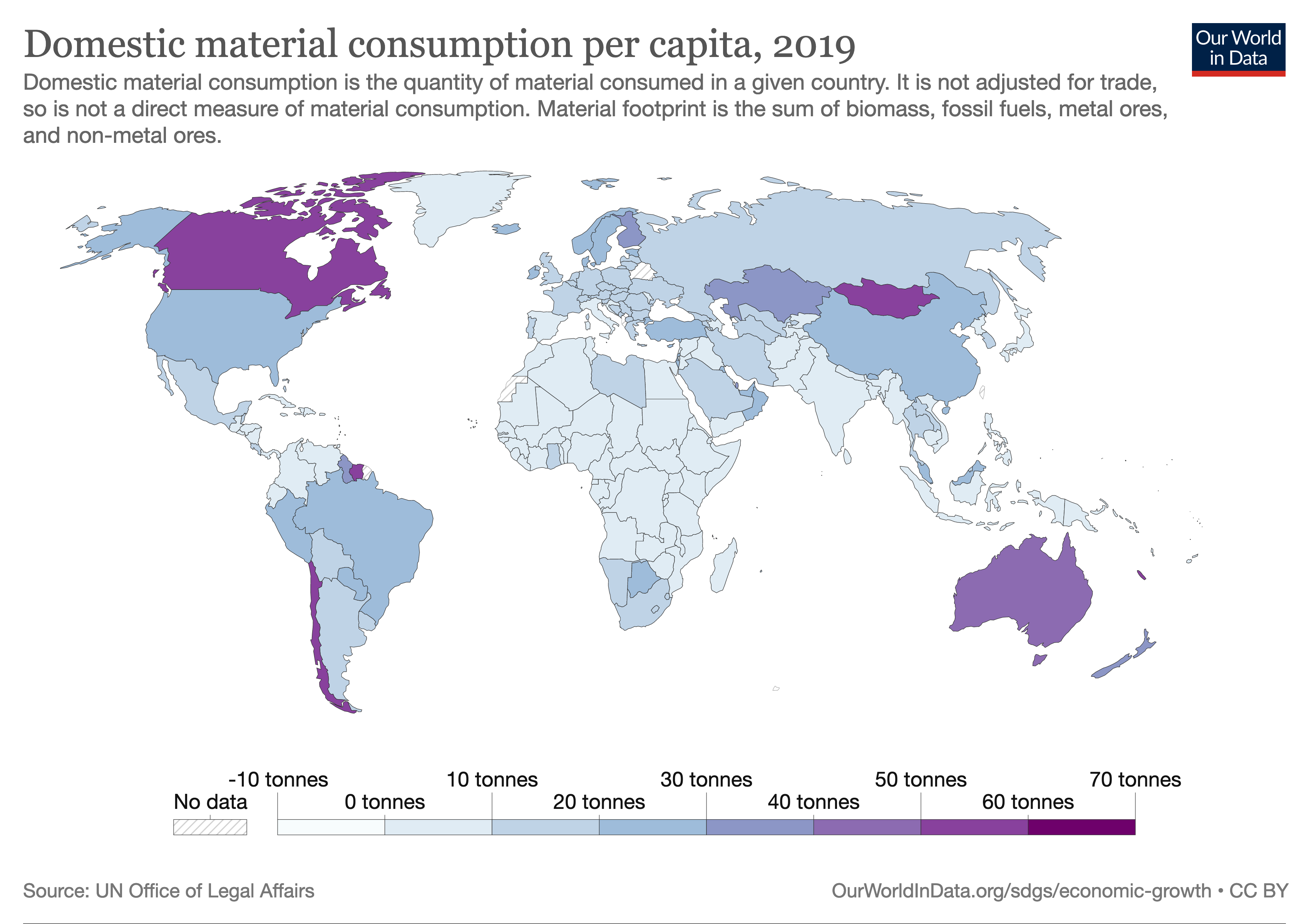
World Map for Indicator 8.4.2: Domestic material consumption per capita, 2017

The official title of Target 8.4 is: "Improve progressively, through 2030, global resource efficiency in consumption and production and endeavour to decouple economic growth from environmental degradation, in accordance with the 10‑Year Framework of Programs on Sustainable Consumption and Production, with developed countries taking the lead."

It has two indicators:

- Indicator 8.4.1: Material footprint, material footprint per capita, and material footprint per GDP
- Indicator 8.4.2: Domestic material consumption, domestic material consumption per capita, and domestic material consumption per GDP

The total material footprint is the sum of the material footprint for biomass, fossil fuels, metal ores and non-metal ores. Data on material footprints are outdated and unavailable after the year 2010. Material footprint per capita has had an increase of 39 per cent from the year 2000 to 2017 reaching 12.18 tonnes and material footprint per unit of GDP has had an increase of 7 percent from the year 2000 to 2017 reaching 1.16 kg.

Domestic material consumption per capita has increased by 11 per cent from 2010 to 2017 reaching 12.17 tonnes and domestic material consumption per unit of GDP has not increased between 2010 and 2017 staying at a value of 1.16 kg.

=== Target 8.5: Full employment and decent work with equal pay ===
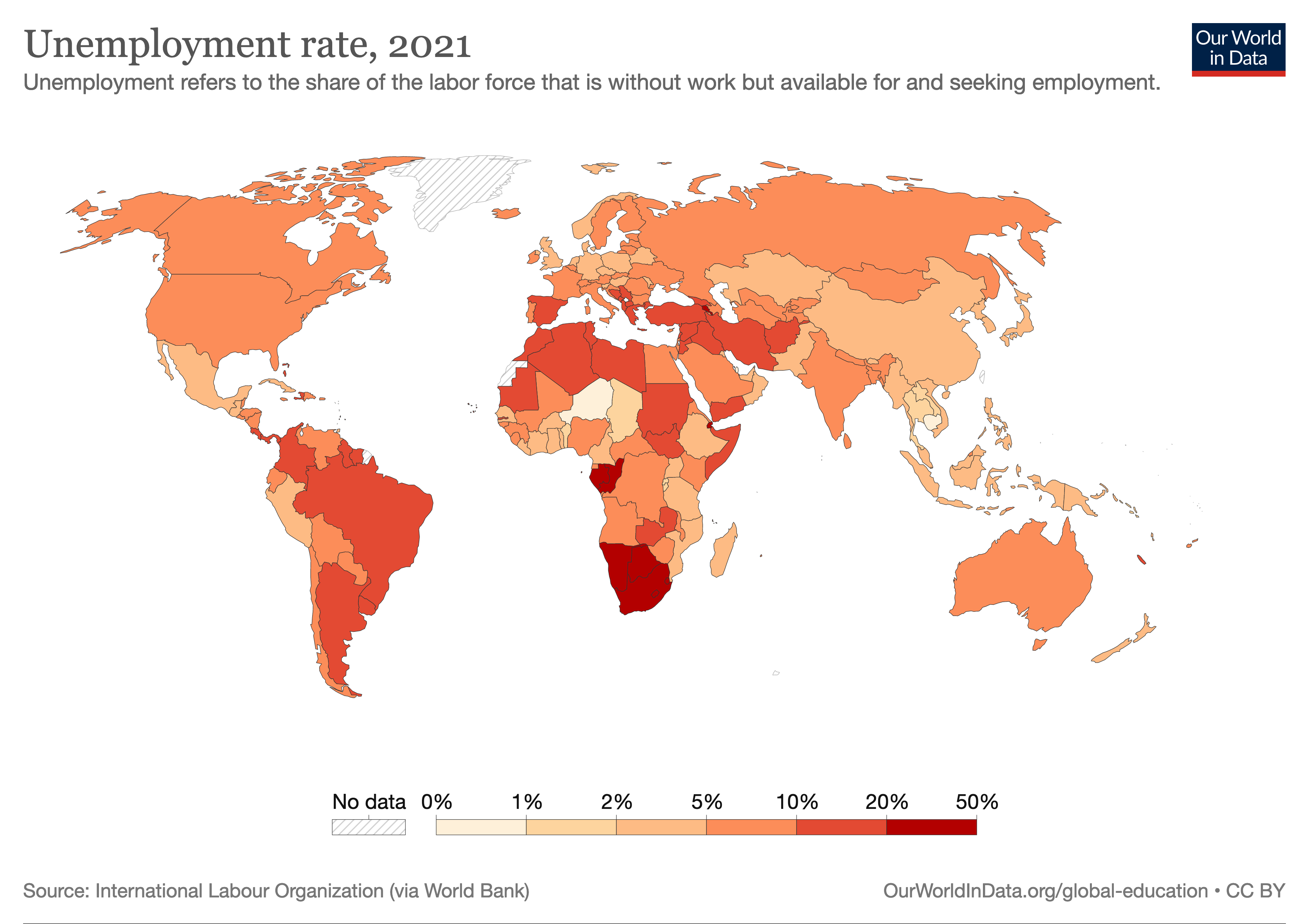
World map for indicator 8.5.2 in 2017 - Unemployment rate

The full title for Target 8.5 is: "By 2030, achieve full and productive employment and decent work for all women and men, including for young people and persons with disabilities, and equal pay for work of equal value".

Target 8.5 has two indicators:

- Indicator 8.5.1: Average hourly earnings of female and male employees, by occupation, age and persons with disabilities
- Indicator 8.5.2: Unemployment rate, by sex, age and persons with disabilities

Average earnings are reported for male and female employees, but not available across countries for further breakdowns. In 2017, "a factor-weighted gender pay gap of 19 per cent was determined".

=== Target 8.6: Promote youth employment, education and training ===
The full title for Target 8.6 is: "By 2020, substantially reduce the proportion of youth not in employment, education or training". Unlike most SDG targets set for the year 2030, this is set to be achieved by 2020.

It has one indicator. Indicator 8.6.1 is the "Proportion of youth (aged 15–24 years) not in education, employment or training".

Most SDGs are either set to be reached by 2020 or 2030. While SDG 8, is due in 2030 target 8.6 has already expired in 2020.

In 2019, "22 percent of the world's young people were not in employment, education or training, a figure that has hardly changed since 2005".

In Canada, over the years there has been a slight decrease in the number of youths not associated with education, employment and or training (NEET). The NEET rates in 1975 were 18% and in 2020, the NEET rates were 20%.

While there has been progress in many North American and European Countries, this is not the case for most African countries. As the NEET rates for youth in the majority of African countries are higher today than in 2015 (when the SDGs were originally implemented).

Youth that is NEET, are more likely to have adverse effects on their emotional, physical and psychosocial wellbeing. The lack of decent employment can also contribute to exacerbating global issues such as poverty and mass migration.

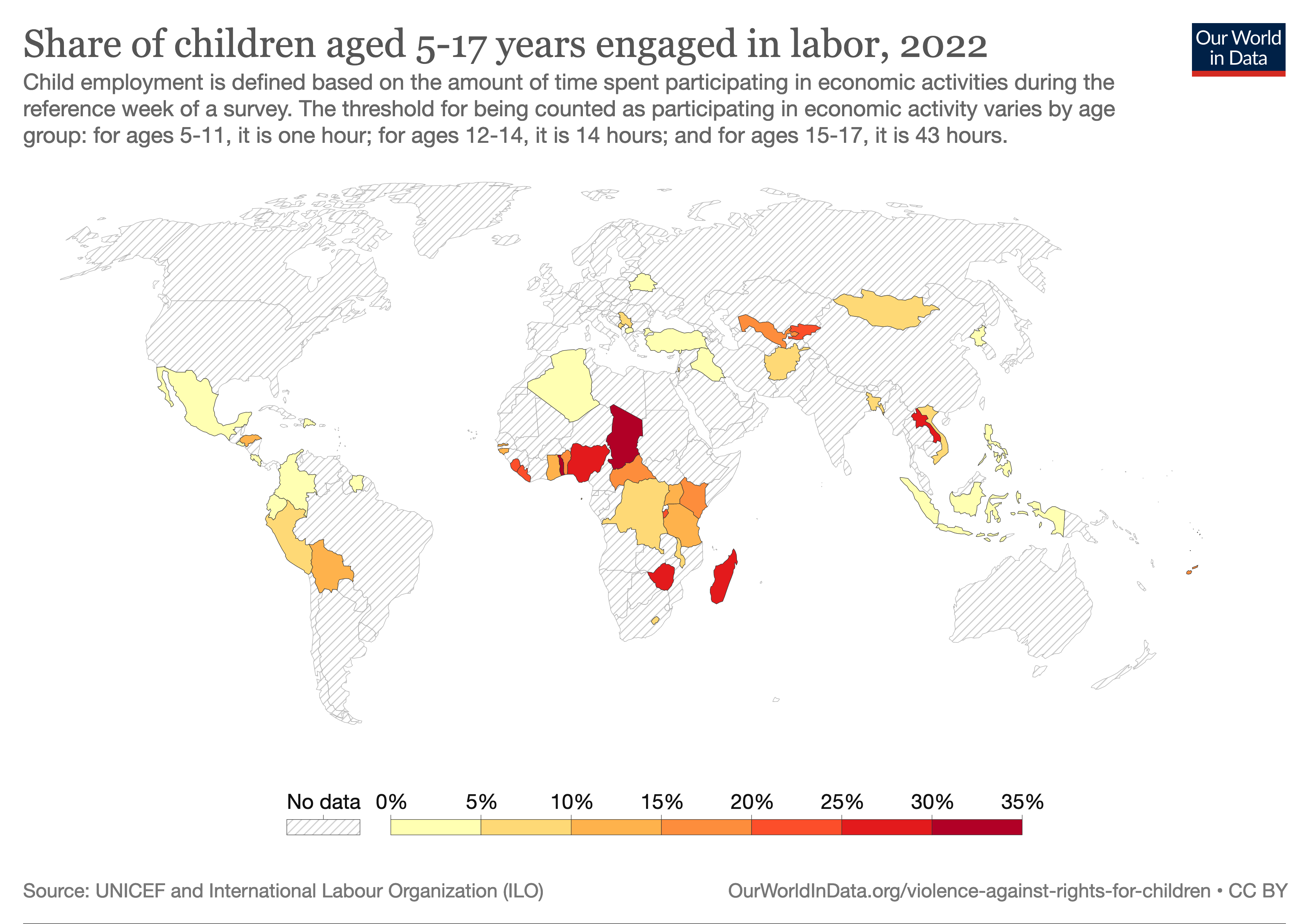
World map for indicator 8.7.1 in 2015 - Share of children aged 5-17 years old in employment

=== Target 8.7: End modern slavery, trafficking, and child labour ===
The full title for Target 8.7 is "Take immediate and effective measures to eradicate forced labour, end modern slavery and human trafficking and secure the prohibition and elimination of the worst forms of child labour, including recruitment and use of child soldiers, and by 2025 end child labour in all its forms".

There is one indicator: Indicator 8.7.1 is the "Proportion and number of children aged 5–17 years engaged in child labour, by sex and age".

=== Target 8.8: Protect labour rights and promote safe working environments ===
The full title of the Target 8.8 is: "Protect labour rights and promote safe and secure working environments for all workers, including migrant workers, in particular women migrants, and those in precarious employment".

It has two indicators:

- Indicator 8.8.1: Frequency rates of fatal and non-fatal occupational injuries, by sex and migrant status
- Indicator 8.8.2: Level of national compliance with labour rights (freedom of association and collective bargaining) based on International Labour Organization (ILO) textual sources and national legislation, by sex and migrant status

=== Target 8.9: Promote beneficial and sustainable tourism ===
The full text for Target 8.9 is "By 2030, devise and implement policies to promote sustainable tourism that creates jobs and promotes local culture and products."

It has two indicators:

- Indicator 8.9.1: Tourism direct GDP as a proportion of total GDP and in growth rate
- Indicator 8.9.2: The proportion of jobs in sustainable tourism industries out of total tourism jobs

A proposal has been tabled in 2020 to delete Indicator 8.9.2.

Every country will be able to generate income as it aims at improving its tourist attraction.

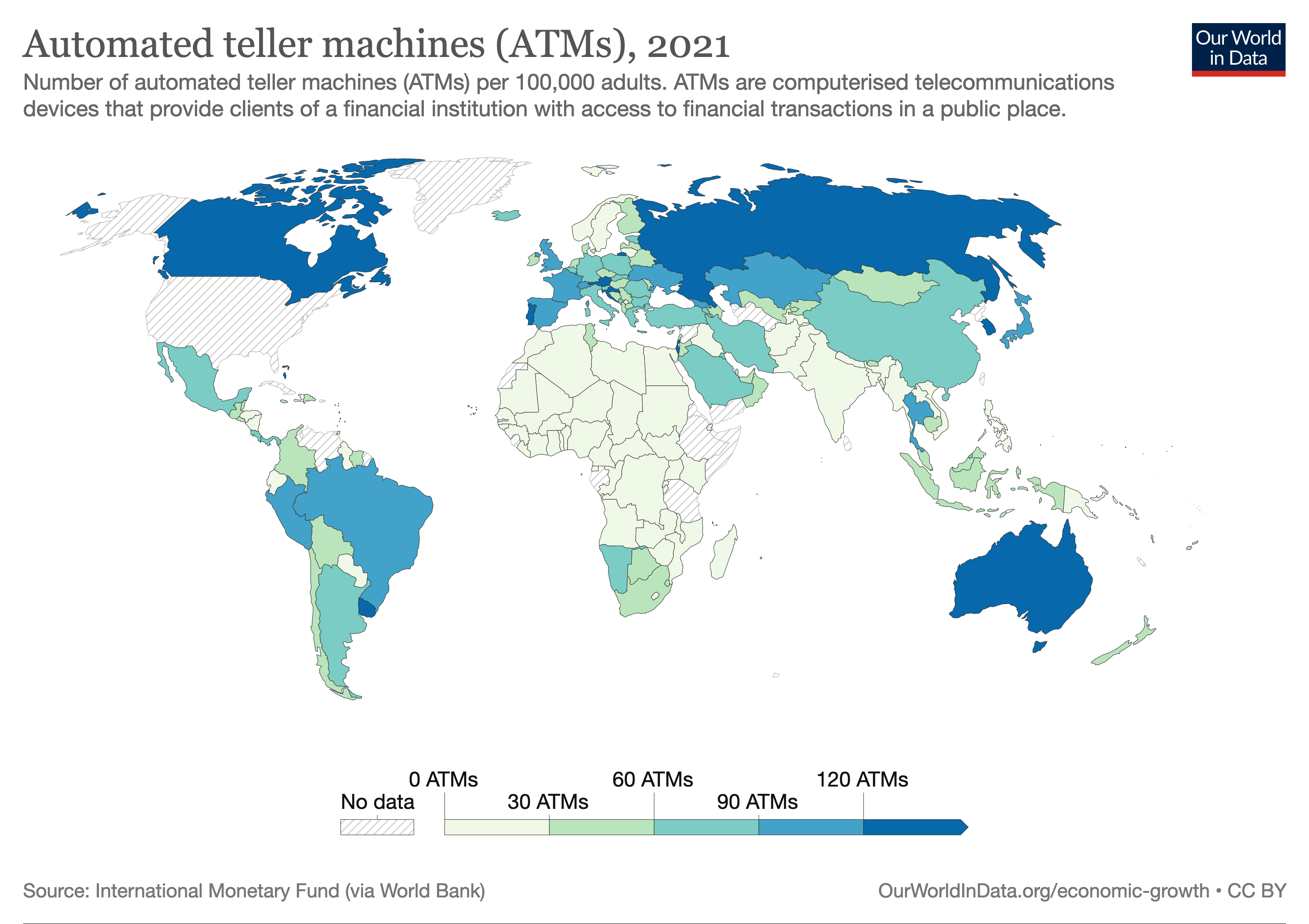
World map for Indicator 8.10.1 in 2017 - ATMs per 100,000 adults

The United Nations World Tourism Organization (UNWTO) defines sustainable tourism as “tourism that takes full account of its current and future economic, social and environmental impacts, addressing the needs of visitors, the industry, the environment, and host communities”

=== Target 8.10: Universal access to banking, insurance and financial services ===
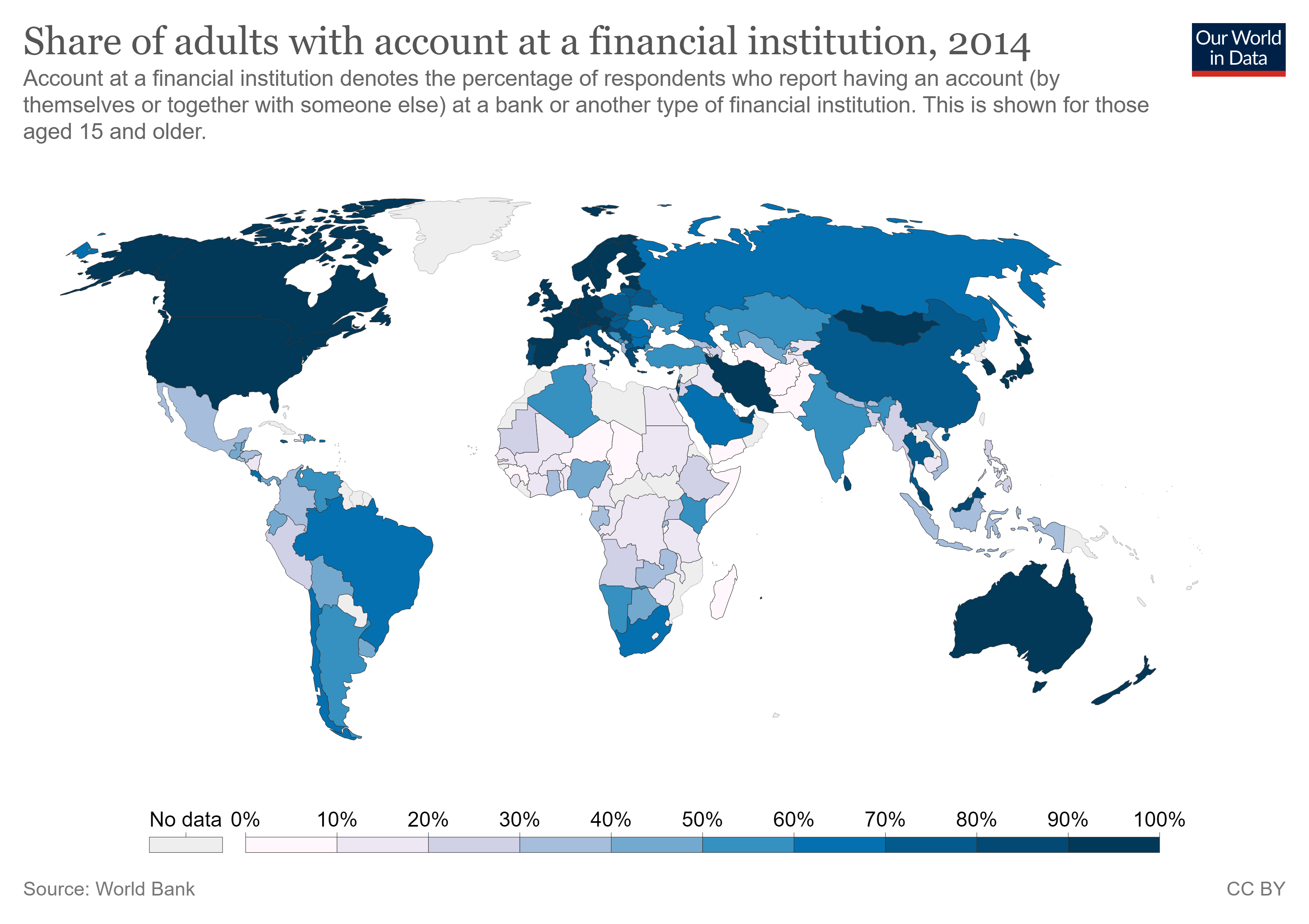
SDG Indicator 8.10.2 Adult population with account at financial institution

The official text for Target 8.10 is: "Strengthen the capacity of domestic financial institutions to encourage and expand access to banking, insurance and financial services for all".

Target 8.10 has two indicators:

- Indicator 8.10.1: Number of commercial bank branches per 100,000 adults and (b) number of automated teller machines (ATMs) per 100,000 adults
- Indicator 8.10.2: Proportion of adults (15 years and older) with an account at a bank or other financial institution or with a mobile-money-service provider

=== Target 8.a: Increase aid for trade support ===
The official wording for Target 8.a "Increase Aid for Trade support for developing countries, in particular, least developed countries, including through the Enhanced Integrated Framework for Trade-related Technical Assistance to Least Developed Countries."

It has one indicator. Indicator 8.a.1 is the "Aid for Trade commitments and disbursements".

The indicator 8.a.1 is measured as total Official Development Assistance (ODA) allocated to aid for trade in 2015 US$.

In 2018, "aid for trade commitments remained stable, at $58 billion, based on current prices". South and Central Asia "received the highest share thereof (31.4 per cent), followed by sub-Saharan Africa (29.2 per cent)".

=== Target 8.b: Develop a global youth employment strategy ===
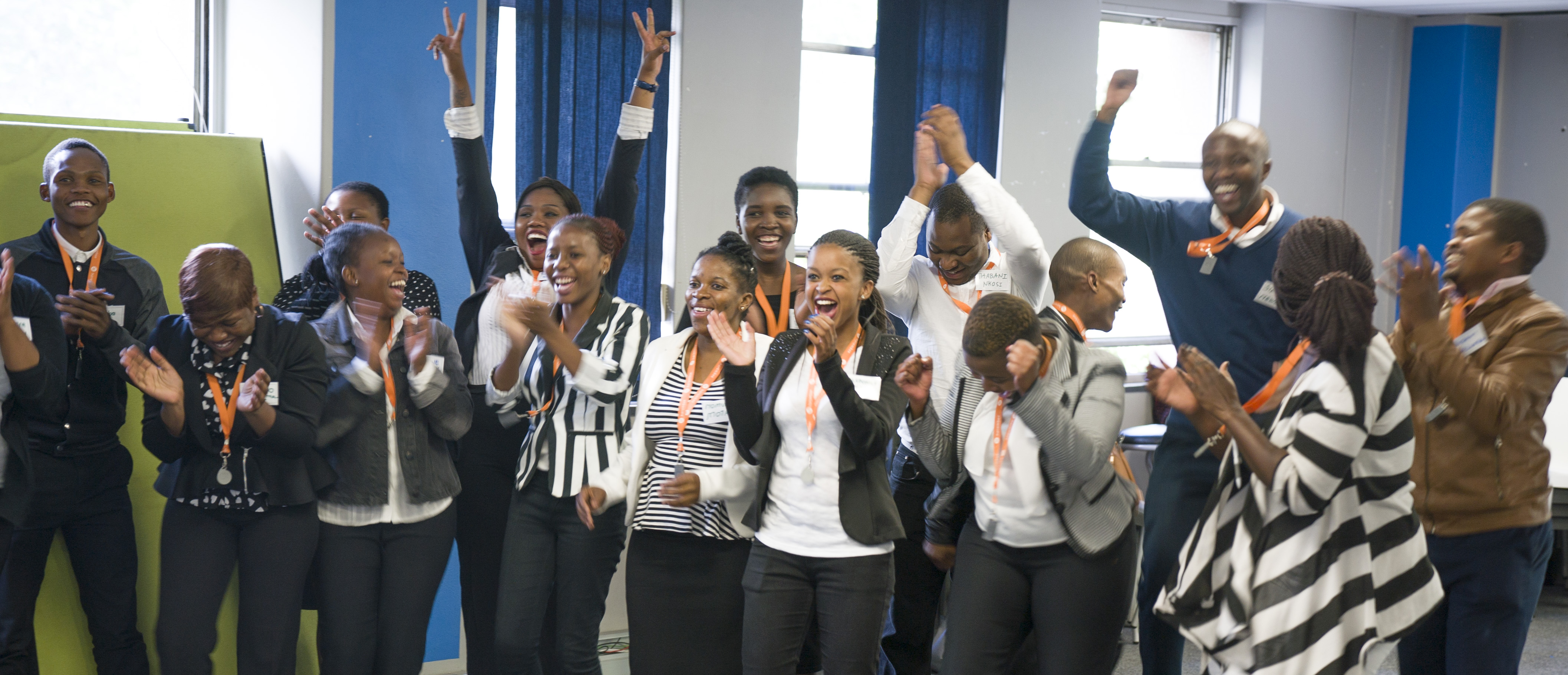
Graduates of Harambee Youth Employment Accelerator in Johannesburg

The full title of Target 8.b is: "By 2020, develop and operationalize a global strategy for youth employment and implement the Global Jobs Pact of the International Labour Organization".

It has one indicator: Indicator 8.b.1 is the "Existence of a developed and operationalized national strategy for youth employment".

Unlike most SDG targets with a target for 2030, the goal date for this indicator is 2020. According to data for 2019, 98 per cent of the countries surveyed had a youth employment strategy or a plan to develop one in the near future. ILO as the agency for this indicator is in charge of the data gathering for the progress of Global Youth Empowerment Strategy.

=== Custodian agencies ===
Custodian agencies are in charge of reporting on the following indicators:

- Indicator 8.1.1: United Nations Department of Economic and Social Affairs (UN-DESA) and United Nations Statistics Division (UNSD).
- Indicators 8.2.1, 8.3.1,8.5.1, 8.5.2, 8.6.1, 8.8.1, 8.8.2 and 8.b.1: International Labour Organisation (ILO).
- Indicators 8.4.1 and 8.4.2: United Nations Environment Programme (UNEP).
- Indicator 8.7.1: The International Labour Organisation (ILO) and United Nations International Children's Emergency Fund (UNICEF).
- Indicators 8.9.1 and 8.9.2: United Nations World Tourism Organization (UNWTO).
- Indicator 8.10.1: International Monetary Fund (IMF).
- Indicator 8.10.2: World Bank (WB).
- Indicator 8.a.1: Organisation for Economic Co-operation and Development (OECD).

== Monitoring ==
High-level progress reports for all the SDGs are published in the form of reports by the United Nations Secretary General; the most recent is from April 2021.

== Links with other SDGs ==
The attainment of SDG 8 is vested on the success and progress of other SDGs. There cannot be growth in the economy of any country if its citizens are not well educated. Therefore, SDG 8; Decent Work and Economic Growth interlinks with Quality Education (SDG 4), Gender Equality (SDG 5) for equal work opportunities. There are also strong ties with Industry, Innovation and Infrastructure (SDG 9) and Responsible consumption and production (SDG 12).

== Organizations ==
=== UN system ===
- World Bank Group: Since the inception of the Global Goals, The World Bank has been in support with the vision to alleviate poverty and empower both gender through its training, resources mobilisation and others.
- United Nations Office for Outer Space Affairs (UNOOSA)
- International Labour Organisation
- UN Women acts to "achieve economic rights and growth for all by promoting decent work, equal pay for equal work, equal access to economic assets and opportunities, and the fair distribution of unpaid care work".
- United Nations World Tourism Organization (UNWTO)

== Challenges ==
=== Impacts of COVID-19 pandemic ===
With companies shutting down and small scale business being affected as a result of the COVID-19 pandemic it is reported that chances of employment will continue to decrease.

The outbreak of the COVID-19 pandemic in 2020 has reduced the growth of every economy in the world, including every sector like banking, insurance and services. Other sectors such as tourism, are also facing challenges and the GDP per capita is expected to drop by 4.2% this period.

== Criticism ==
Several researchers have noted that continued global economic growth of 3 percent (Goal 8.1) may not be reconcilable with the ecological sustainability SDGs (6, 12, 13, 14, and 15), because the required rate of absolute global eco-economic decoupling is far higher than any country has achieved in the past. According to anthropologist Jason Hickel, it may also conflict with other non-environmental goals as well; for example, SDG 1 (no poverty) may become unachievable if economic development leads to most jobs becoming fully automated, which may be easier in the developing countries' crucial manufacturing sector. In light of this, he proposes eliminating Goal 8.1 and modifying other goals, such as SDGs 8.4 and 10 (reduced income inequality) to make them quantitative and explicitly oriented toward sustainability and social welfare.

== See also ==
- Fiscal sustainability
