= Aid for Trade =

World Trade Organization initiative

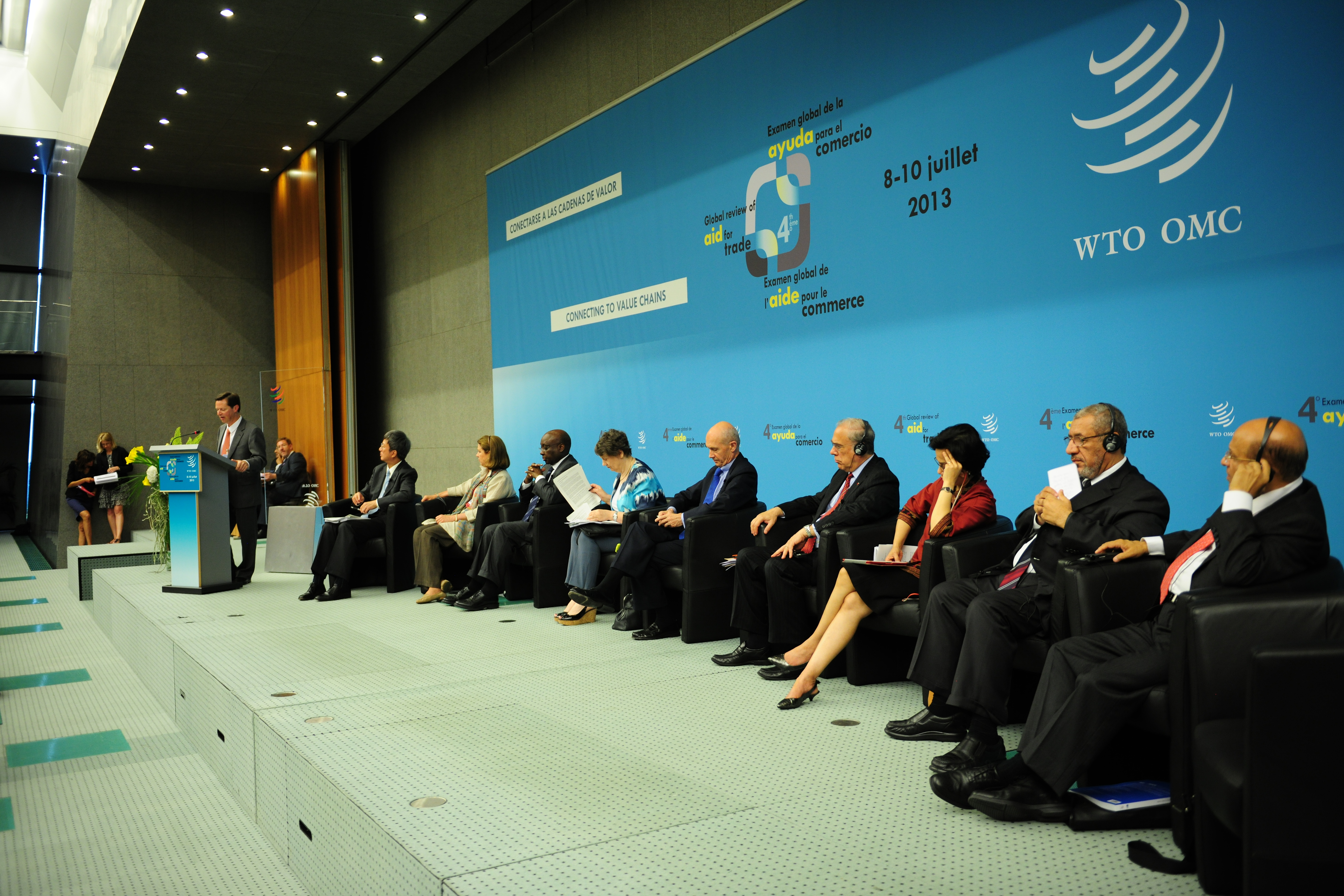
Fourth Global Review of Aid for Trade, 2013

Aid for Trade is an initiative by the World Trade Organization (WTO), as well as a policy concept in international economic and trade development, concerned with helping developing countries and particularly the least developed countries build trade capacity and infrastructure.

Aid for Trade is included in Sustainable Development Goal 8 concerning "decent work and economic growth", which is one of the 17 Sustainable Development Goals which were established by the United Nations General Assembly in 2015. Target 8.a aims to "Increase Aid for Trade support for developing countries, in particular, least developed countries, including through the Enhanced Integrated Framework for Trade-related Technical Assistance to Least Developed Countries."

In 2018, aid for trade commitments remained stable, at $58 billion, based on current prices. South and Central Asia received the highest share thereof (31.4 per cent), followed by sub-Saharan Africa (29.2 per cent). Lower-middle-income countries received 37.5 per cent of aid for trade, followed by least developed countries (36.8 per cent).

In 2022, Africa and Asia together received 70% of Aid for Trade funds. Asia's share rose by 22% to US$18.2 billion, while Africa's fell by 2.5% to US$17.54 billion.

== Overview ==
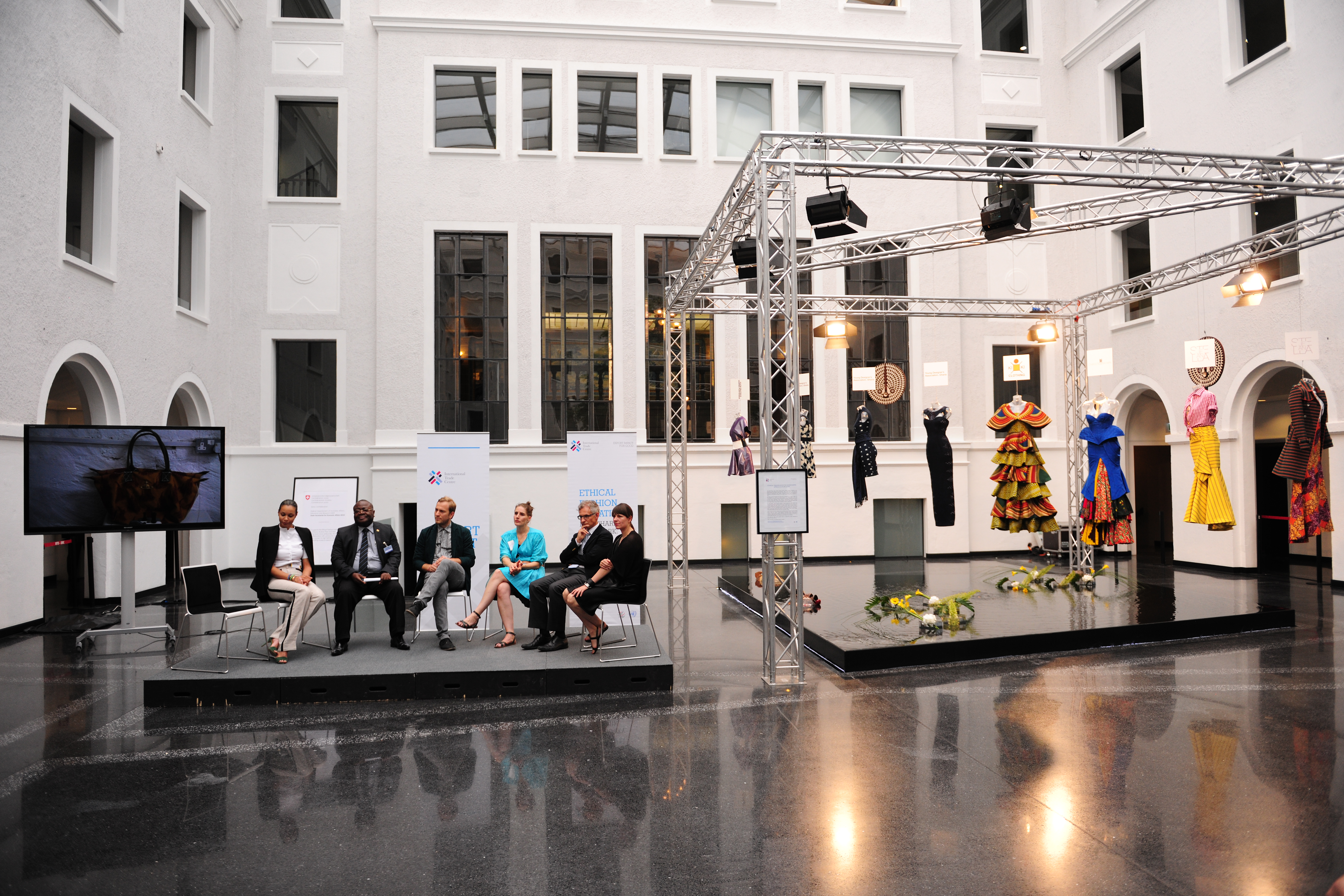
Panel session during the Fourth Global Review of Aid for Trade "Connecting To Value Chains"

Aid for Trade includes measures to help countries develop trade strategies, plans or projects and implementation, such as building roads, ports, and telecommunications that link domestic and global markets, or investing in industries and sectors to help diversify exports.

Many have credited Aid for Trade with economic improvements in developing countries, while others point out that not all trade initiatives are successful and some of the funding is lost to corruption.

The OECD and WTO established an 'aid-for-trade monitoring framework' to track progress in implementing the Aid-for-Trade Initiative. It consists of the following elements:

- mainstreaming and prioritising trade (demand).
- mainstreaming and prioritising trade (demand)
- trade-related projects and programmes (response).
- enhanced capacity to trade (outcome).
- improved trade performance and reduced poverty (impact).

== Value of commitments ==
Total commitments by donor country, 2015

Total commitments by recipient country, 2017

According to the UN, in 2017, the global total value of Aid for Trade disbursements exceeded US$43 billion, with an additional c. US$15 billion committed. Increasing Aid for Trade support is included as an objective in the United Nations Sustainable Development Goal 8 "decent work and economic growth" indicator 8.a.

The EU and its member states are the largest contributor of Aid for Trade.

In 2018, aid for trade commitments remained stable, at $58 billion, based on current prices. South and Central Asia received the highest share thereof (31.4 per cent), followed by sub-Saharan Africa (29.2 per cent). Lower-middle-income countries received 37.5 per cent of aid for trade, followed by least developed countries (36.8 per cent).

== Origins and oversight ==
The Aid for Trade initiative was launched at the World Trade Organization Ministerial Conference in December 2005, and in 2007, the WTO started implementation of its February 2006 recommendations of the Aid for Trade Task Force as it moved into its first stage.

The purpose of the Global Review is to provide strong monitoring and evaluation for the Aid for Trade agenda. Global Review events have been held under the themes of "Maintaining Momentum", "Showing Results", and "Connecting to Value Chains" in 2009, 2011 and 2013 respectively.

- First Global Review 2007
- Second Global Review 2009
- Third Global Review 2011
- Fourth Global Review 2013
- Fifth Global Review 2015
- Sixth Global Review 2017
- Seventh Global Review 2019
- Eighth Global Review 2022

== Sustainable development ==
Aid for Trade is included in the Sustainable Development Goal 8 about "decent work and economic growth" which is one of the 17 Sustainable Development Goals which were established by the United Nations General Assembly in 2015. The official wording for Target 8.a is to "Increase Aid for Trade support for developing countries, in particular, least developed countries, including through the Enhanced Integrated Framework for Trade-related Technical Assistance to Least Developed Countries."

This target has one indicator. Indicator 8.a.1 is the "Aid for Trade commitments and disbursements".

The indicator 8.a.1 is measured as total Official Development Assistance (ODA) allocated to aid for trade in 2015 US$.

== Gallery ==
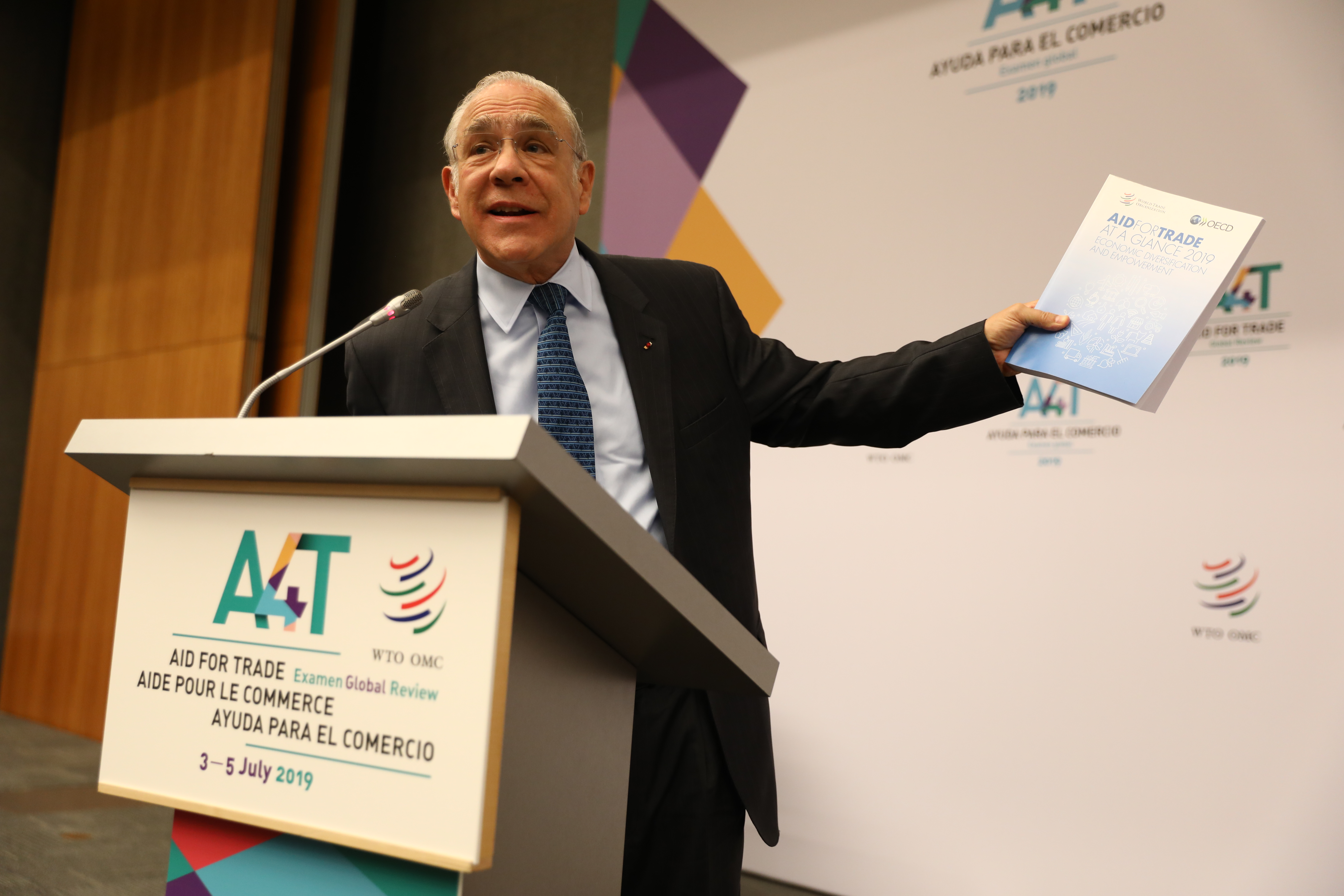

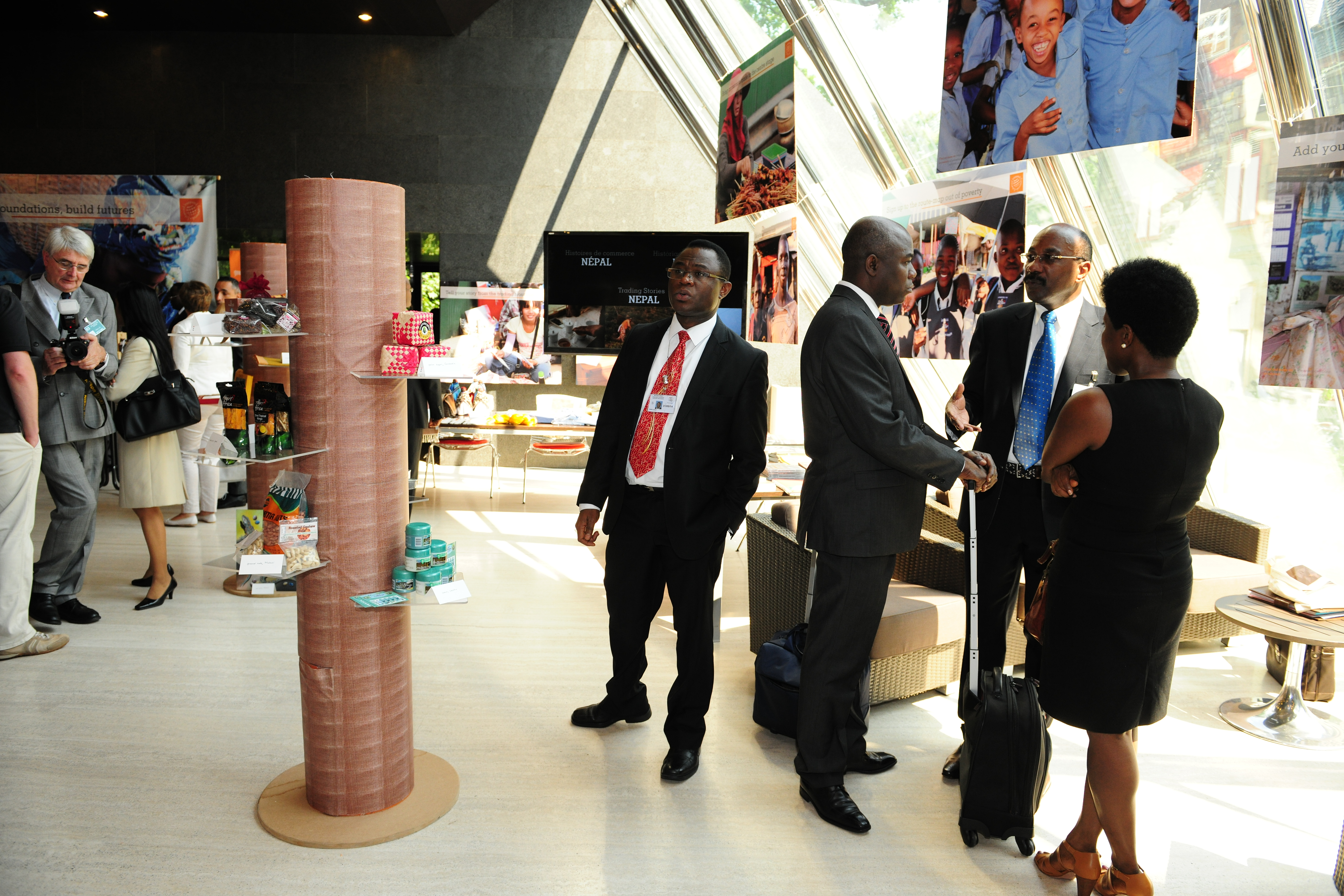

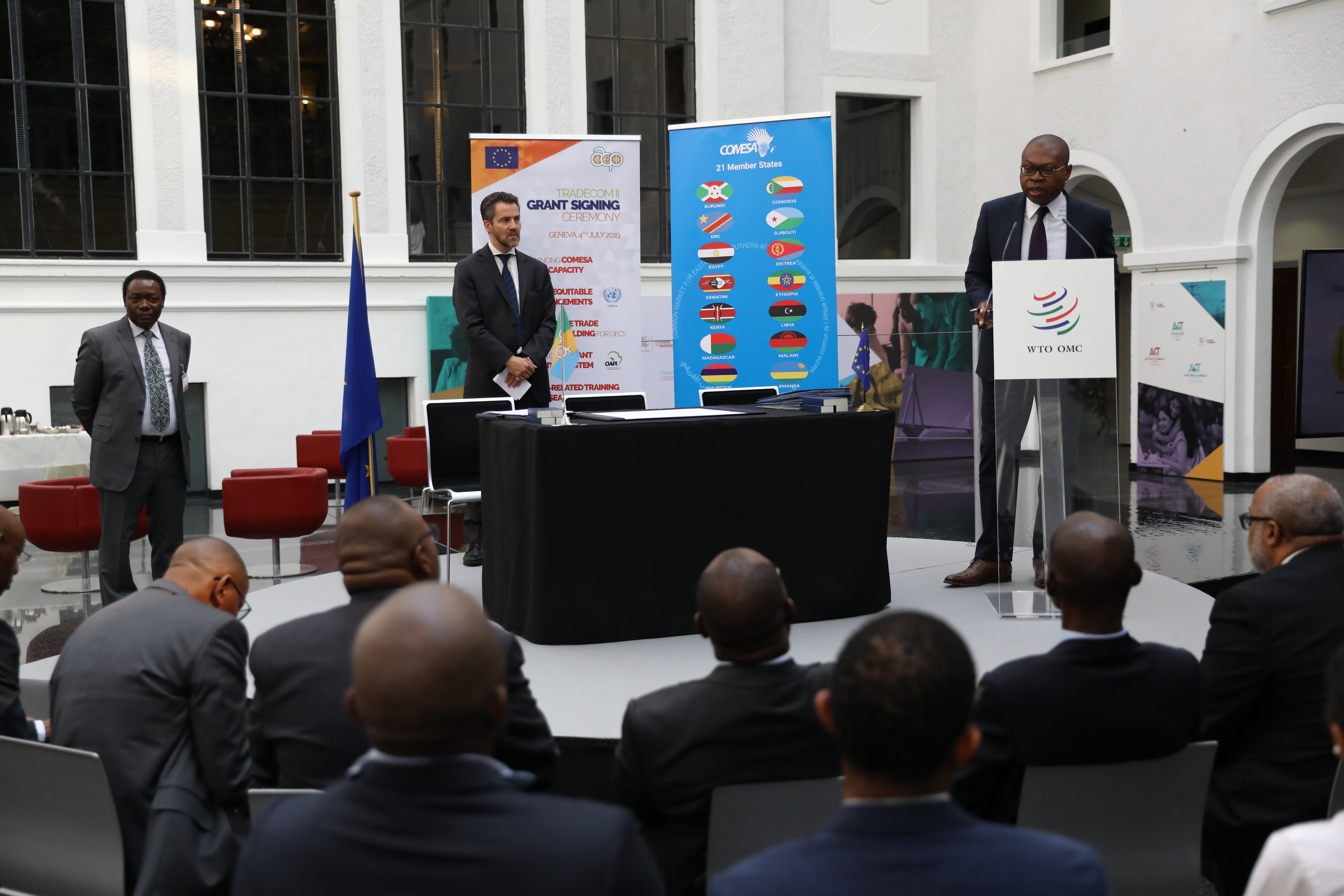

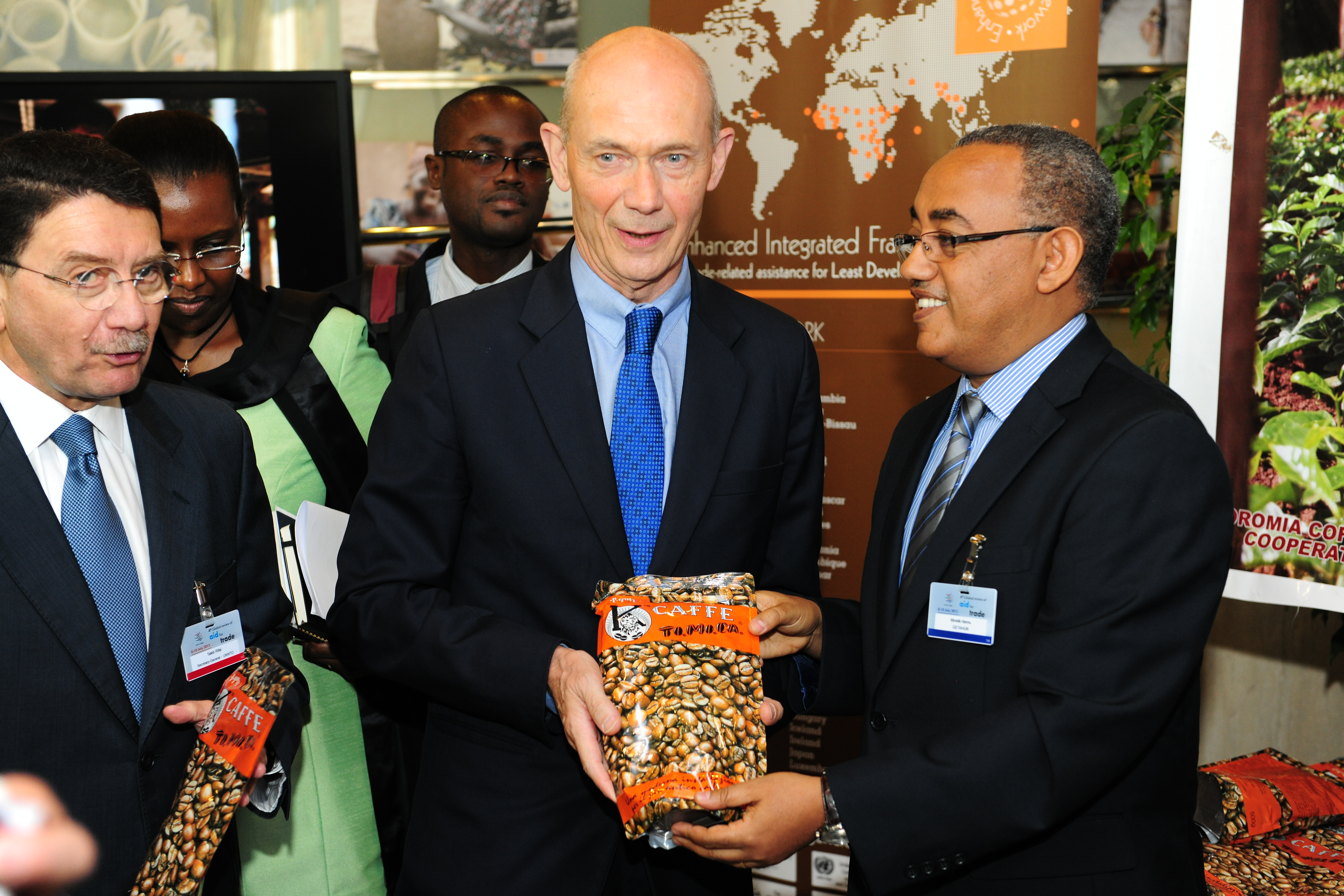

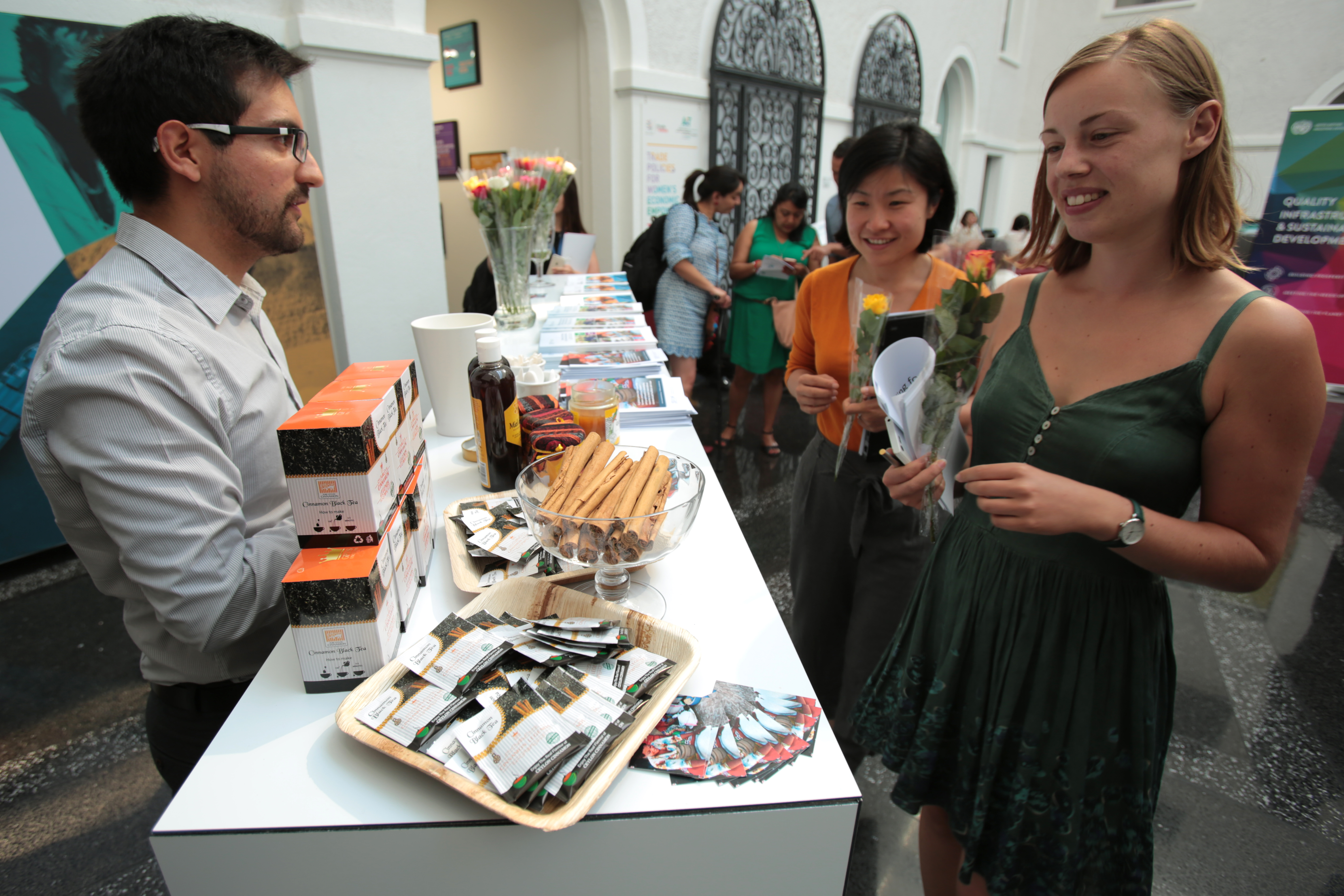

== See also ==
- Development Assistance Committee
- OECD
