= Sustainable Development Goal 9 =

Industry, Innovation and Infrastructure

- Mission statement: "Build resilient infrastructure, promote inclusive and sustainable industrialization, and foster innovation"
- Commercial?: No
- Type of project: Non-Profit
- Location: Global
- Founder: United Nations
- Established: 2015
- Website: sdgs.un.org

Sustainable Development Goal 9 (SDG 9 or Goal 9) is about "industry, innovation and infrastructure" and is one of the 17 Sustainable Development Goals adopted by the United Nations General Assembly in 2015. SDG 9 aims to build resilient infrastructure, promote sustainable industrialization and foster innovation.

SDG 9 has eight targets, and progress is measured by twelve indicators. The first five targets are outcome targets: develop sustainable, resilient and inclusive infrastructures; promote inclusive and sustainable industrialization; increase access to financial services and markets; upgrade all industries and infrastructures for sustainability; enhance research and upgrade industrial technologies. The remaining three targets are means of implementation targets: Facilitate sustainable infrastructure development for developing countries; support domestic technology development and industrial diversification; universal access to information and communications technology.

In 2019, it was reported that "the intensity of global carbon dioxide emissions has declined by nearly one quarter since 2000, showing a general decoupling of carbon dioxide emissions from GDP growth". Millions of people are still unable to access the internet due to cost, coverage, and other reasons. It is estimated that just 54% of the world's population are currently (in 2020) internet users.

== Background ==
The aim of attaining inclusive and sustainable industrialization is to "unleash dynamic and competitive economic forces that generate employment and income". This goal includes striving for resilience (engineering and construction) and urban resilience.

SDG 9 recognizes that humanity's ability to connect and communicate effectively, move people and things efficiently, and develop new skills, industries and technology, is crucial in overcoming the many interlinked economic, social and environmental challenges in the 21st century.

In order to have a successful community, functioning and strong infrastructure has to be in place, as a basic requirement. SDG 9 promotes innovative and sustainable technologies and seeks to ensure equal and universal access to information and financial markets.

The technological development in infrastructure is what gives rise to a sustainable society. This is expected to create prosperity and jobs, and build stable and prosperous societies across the globe. The key emphasis is on developing reliable and sustainable infrastructural solutions that support economic development as well as human well-being, while also ensuring financial affordability. This goal aims at ensuring every society in the world possess good infrastructure.

Achieving SDG 9 will require significant financing and political will. Key challenges include improving internet access in developing countries, inadequate transport, (particularly in land-locked developing countries) and the disparity of Research and Development investment and the number of researchers in developing countries when compared to developed countries.

== Outcome targets ==
SDG 9 is broken down into 8 specific targets to reach the SDG goal. The first five targets are called 'outcome targets' (9.1-9.5), with the last three named 'means of achieving targets' (9.a-9.c). Outcome targets have specific desired outcomes that achieve the objective of the SDG goal. They are as follows: Build resilient infrastructure, promote inclusive and sustainable industrialization, increase access to small scale enterprises, upgrade existing infrastructure, and enhance scientific research. . Each target includes one or more indicators that measure the achieved progress.

=== Target 9.1: Develop sustainable, resilient and inclusive infrastructures ===
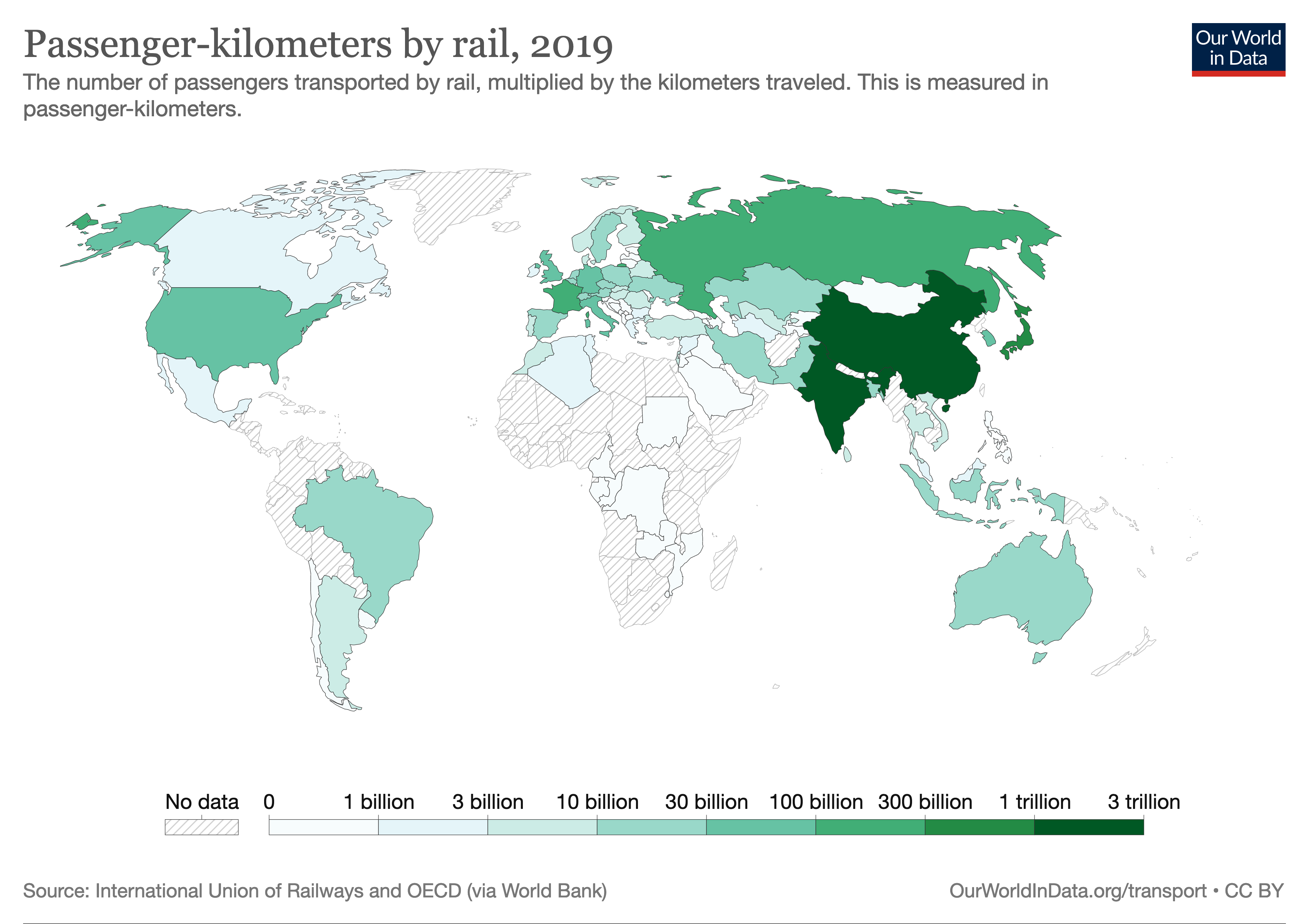
World map for Indicator 9.1.2 in 2014: Railways, passengers carried (passenger-km)

Target 9.1 is: "Develop quality, reliable, sustainable and resilient infrastructure, including regional and trans-border infrastructure, to support economic development and human well-being, with a focus on affordable and fair access for all".

It has two indicators:

- "Proportion of the rural population who live within 2 km of an all-season road"
- "Passenger and freight volumes, by mode of transport"

=== Target 9.2: Promote inclusive and sustainable industrialization ===
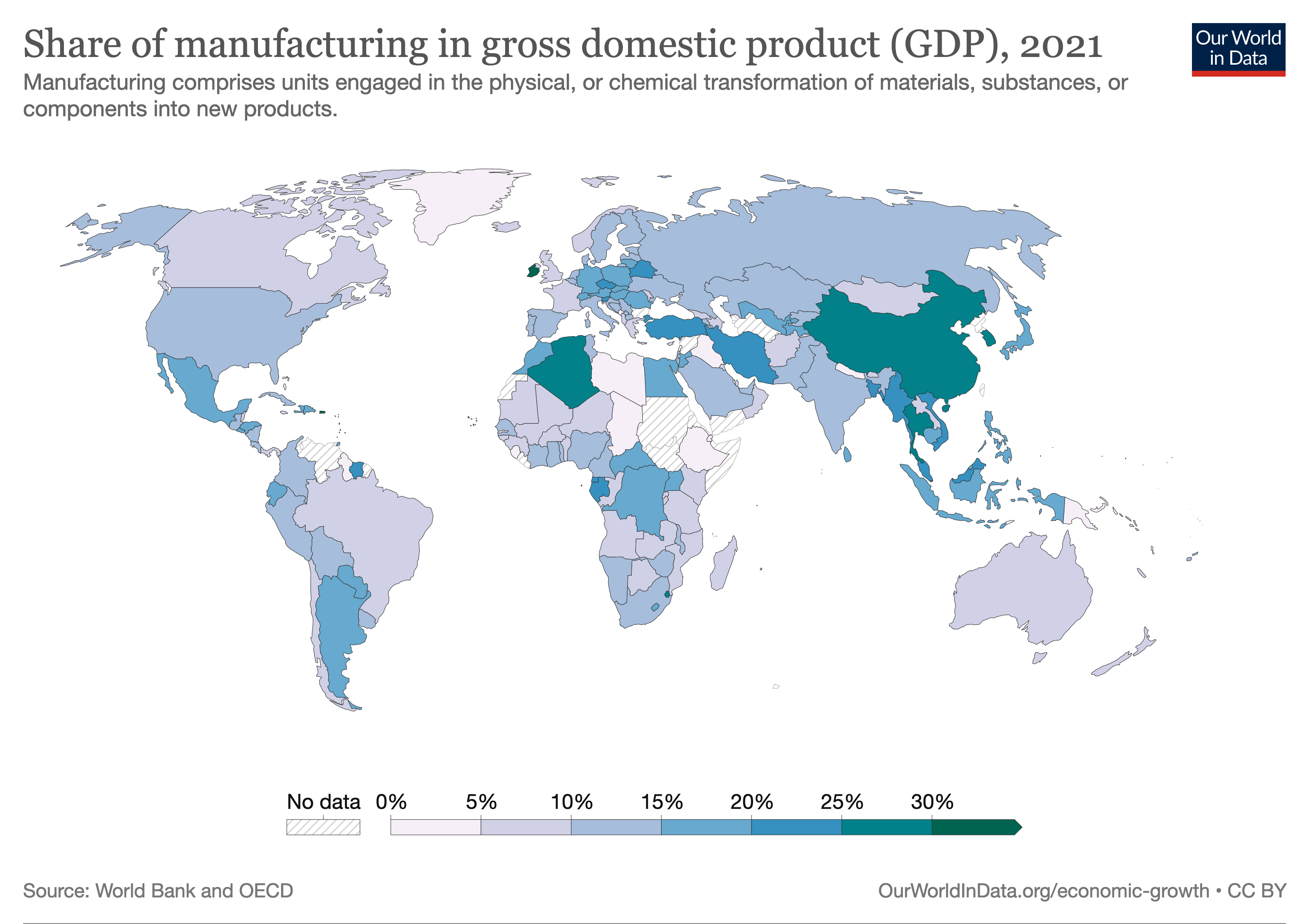
SDG Indicator 9.2.1 Map as at 2017: Manufacturing's value added to GDP (in %).

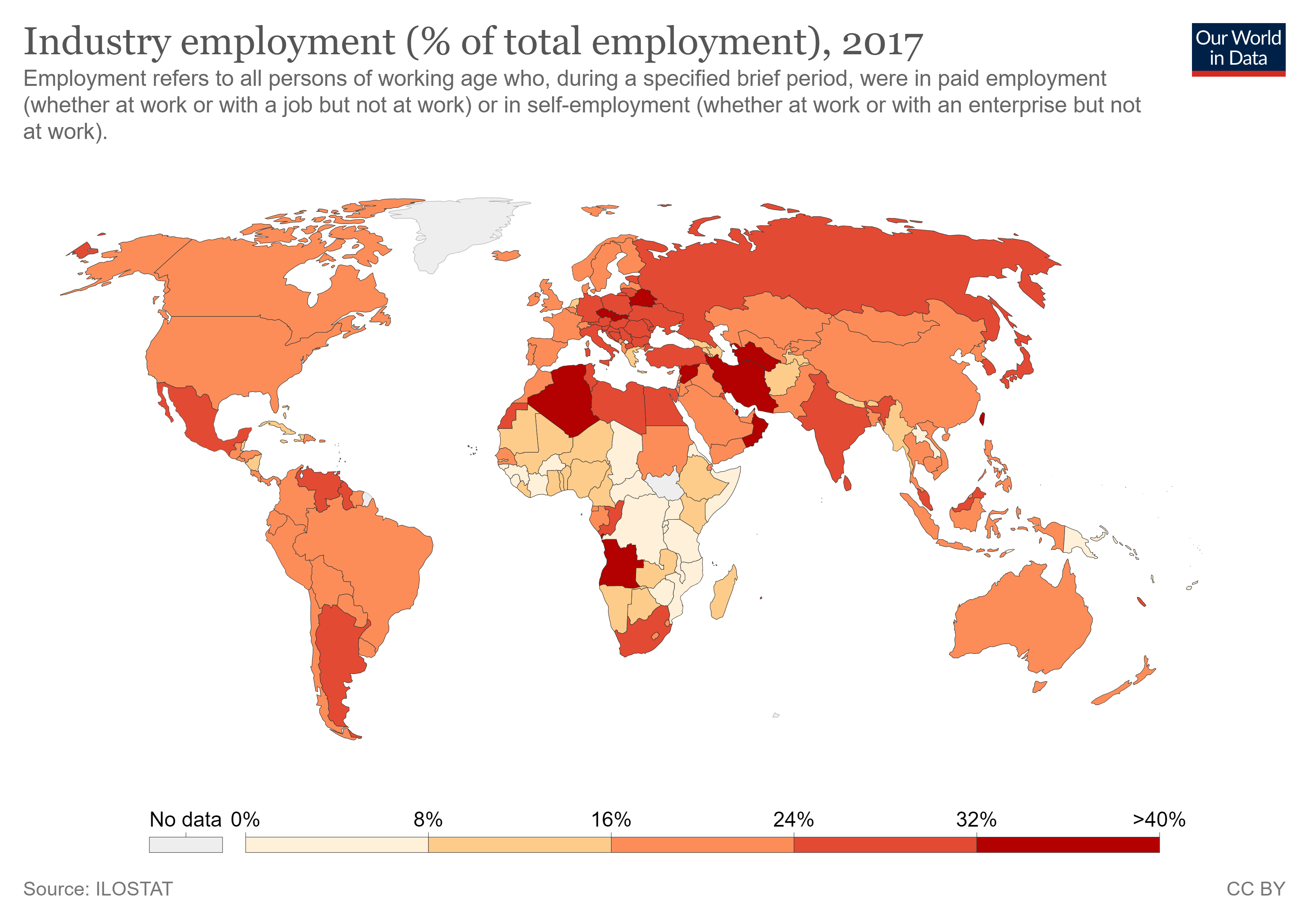
SDG Indicator 9.2.2 as at 2017: Industry employment (% of total employment).

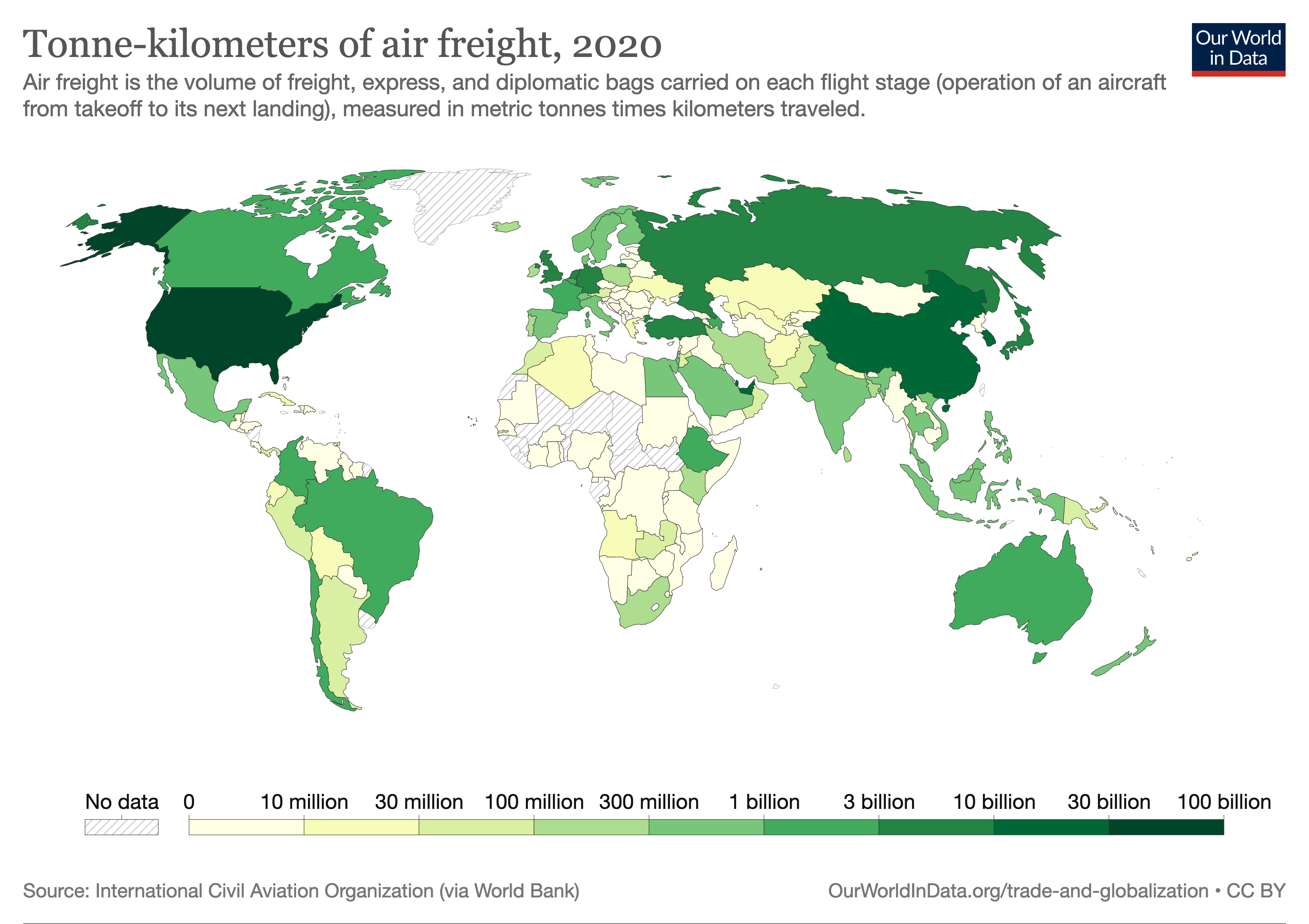
World map for Indicator 9.1.2 in 2017: Air transport, freight(ton-km)

Target 9.2 is "Promote inclusive and sustainable industrialization, and by 2030, to raise significantly the industry's share of employment and GDP in line with national circumstances as well as to double its share in least developed countries"

It has two indicators:

- "Manufacturing value added as a proportion of GDP and per capita"
- "Manufacturing employment as a proportion of total employment"

Manufacturing is a major source of employment. In 2016, the least developed countries had less "manufacturing value added per capita." The figure for Europe and North America was US$4,621, compared to about $100 in the least developed countries.

The industry employment in the world hasn't drastically changed. In 1991, the industry employment made up around 21% of total employment in the world, while in 2017, the industry employment made up 22% of total employment in the world.

Manufacturing employment is growing mostly in developing countries, while it declines in developed countries. In Germany, the manufacturing employment made up 47% of total employment in 1991, while it declined to 27% of total employment in 2017. In Kenya, the manufacturing employment made up 6% of total employment and has grown by two percent points to 8% in 2017.

=== Target 9.3: Increase access to financial services and markets ===
Target 9.3 is: "Increase the access of small-scale industrial and other enterprises, particularly in developing countries, to financial services including affordable credit and their integration into value chains and markets".

It has two indicators:

- "Proportion of small-scale industries in total industry value-added"
- "Proportion of small-scale industries with a loan or line of credit"

According to a UN progress report from 2020, "only 22% of small-scale industries in sub-Saharan Africa received loans or lines of credit, compared with 48% in Latin America and the Caribbean".

=== Target 9.4: Upgrade all industries and infrastructures for sustainability ===
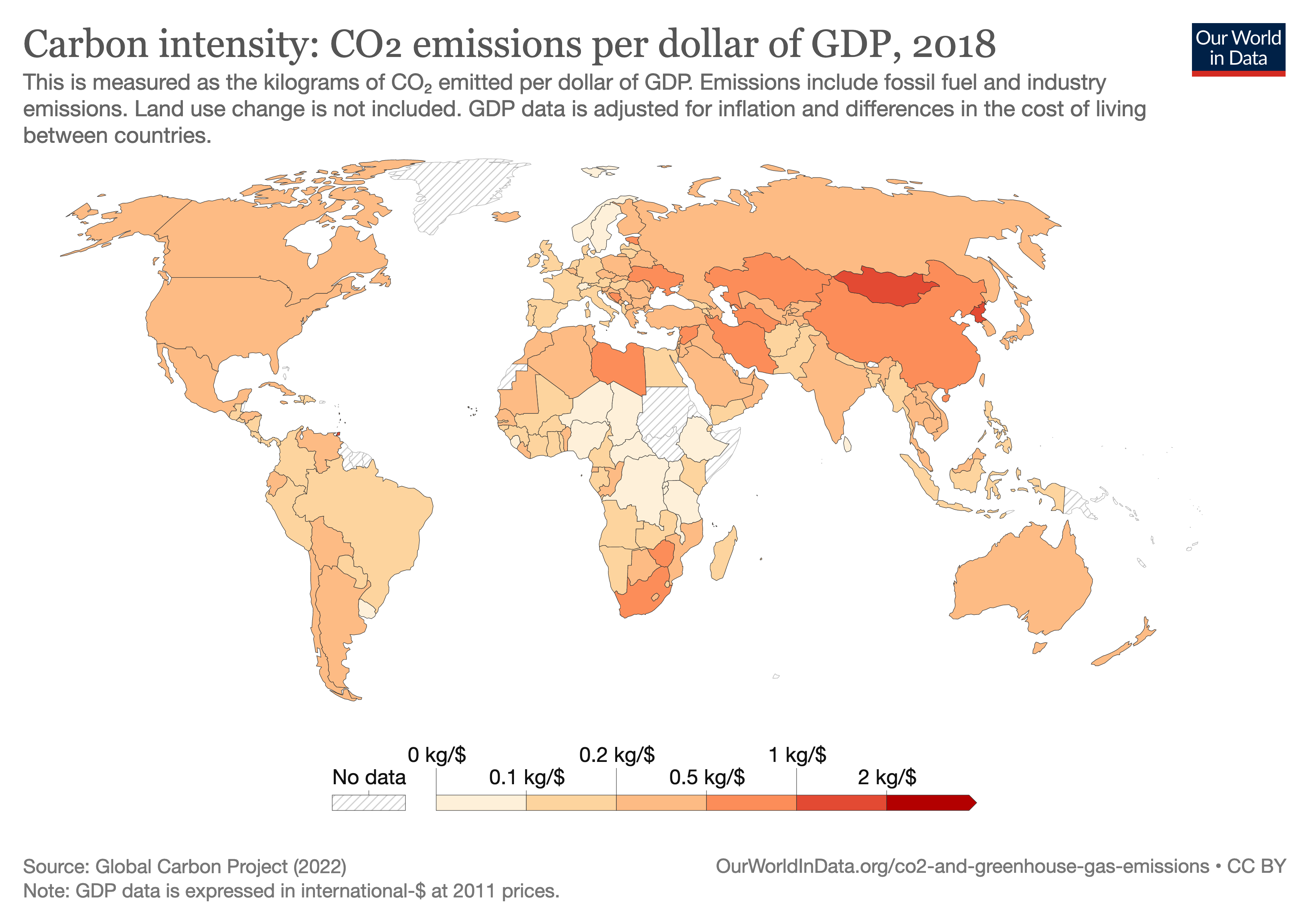
SDG Indicator 9.4.1 as at 2016: Carbon emission intensity of economies.

Target 9.4 is: "By 2030, upgrade infrastructure and retrofit industries to make them sustainable, with increased resource-use efficiency and greater adoption of clean and environmentally sound technologies and industrial processes, with all countries taking action in accordance with their respective capabilities".

It has only one indicator: "CO_{2} emissions per unit of value added."

According to a UN progress report from 2020, the "intensity of global carbon dioxide emissions has declined by nearly one quarter since 2000, showing a general decoupling of carbon dioxide emissions from GDP growth".

=== Target 9.5: Enhance research and upgrade industrial technologies ===
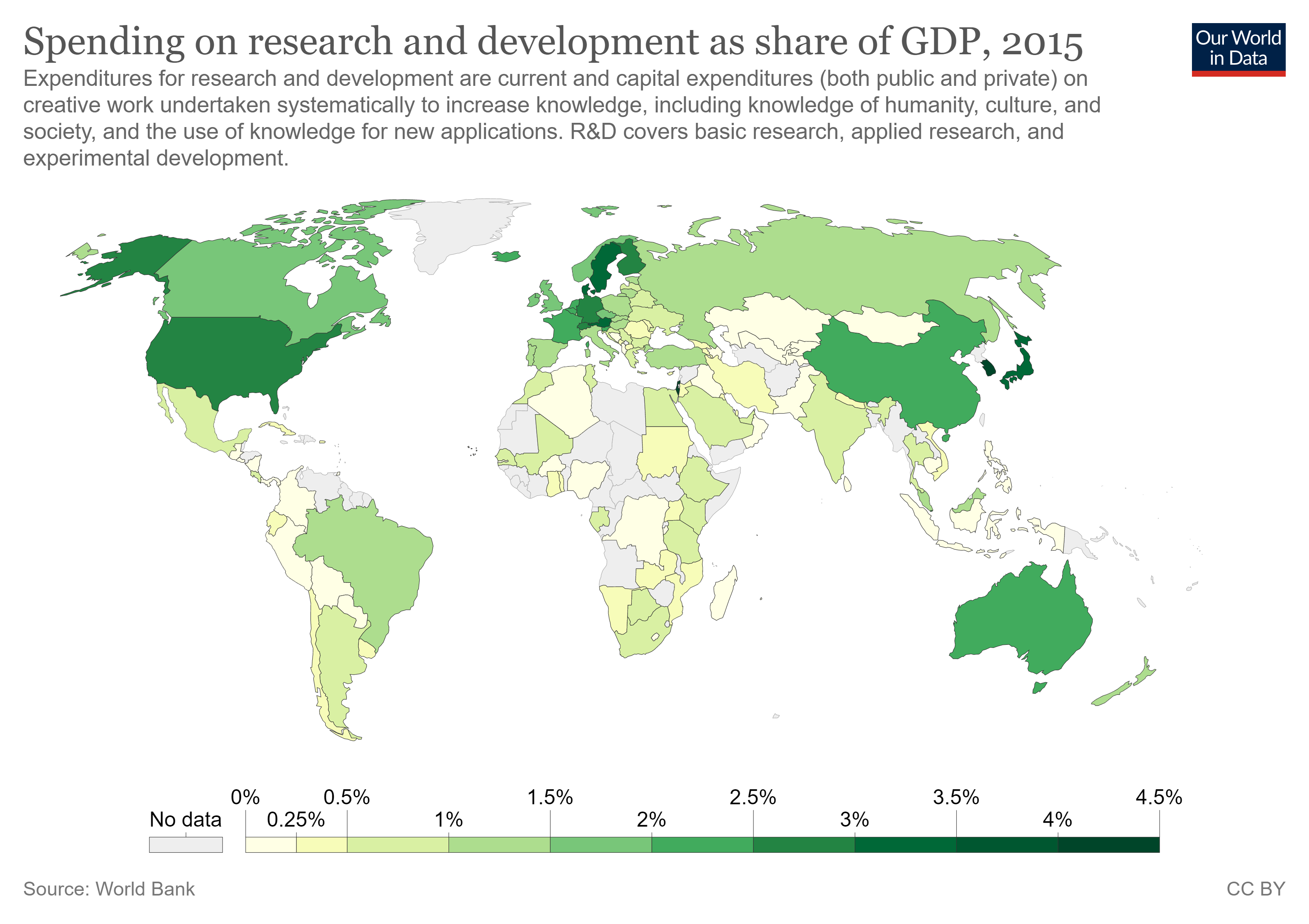
SDG Indicator 9.5.1 Map as at 2015: Spending on research and development as share of GDP.

Target 9.5 is "Enhance scientific research, upgrade the technological capabilities of industrial sectors in all countries, in particular developing countries, including, by 2030, encouraging innovation and substantially increasing the number of research and development workers per 1 million people and public and private research and development spending."

It has two indicators:

- "Research and development expenditure as a proportion of GDP"
- "Number of Researchers (in full-time equivalent) per million inhabitants"

In Europe and North America, the number of researchers per 1 million people jumped to 3,372, and in sub-Saharan Africa, the number of researchers per million inhabitants was closer to 99 By 2018, women represented 33% of all researchers, although data are missing from some of the most populous countries.

By 2018, research and development constituted an average 1.79% of the global GDP according to the UNESCO Institute for Statistics. Although research expenditure rose in most regions between 2014 and 2018, 80% of countries still invested less than 1% of GDP in research and development by 2018. The G20 countries still accounted for nine-tenths of research expenditure, researchers, publications and patents. In some cases, the researcher population rose faster than related expenditure, leaving less funding available to each researcher. Commitments to SDG 9.5 have not spurred an increase in reporting of data. On the contrary, a total of 99 countries reported data on domestic investment in research in 2015 but only 69 countries in 2018. Similarly, 59 countries recorded the number of researchers (in full-time equivalents) in 2018, down from 90 countries in 2015.

== Means of implementation targets ==
=== Target 9.a: Facilitate sustainable infrastructure development for developing countries ===
Target 9.a is: "Facilitate sustainable and resilient infrastructure development in developing countries through enhanced financial, technological and technical support to African countries, least developed countries, landlocked developing countries and Small Island Developing States."

It has one indicator: "Total official international support (official development assistance plus other official flows) to infrastructure".

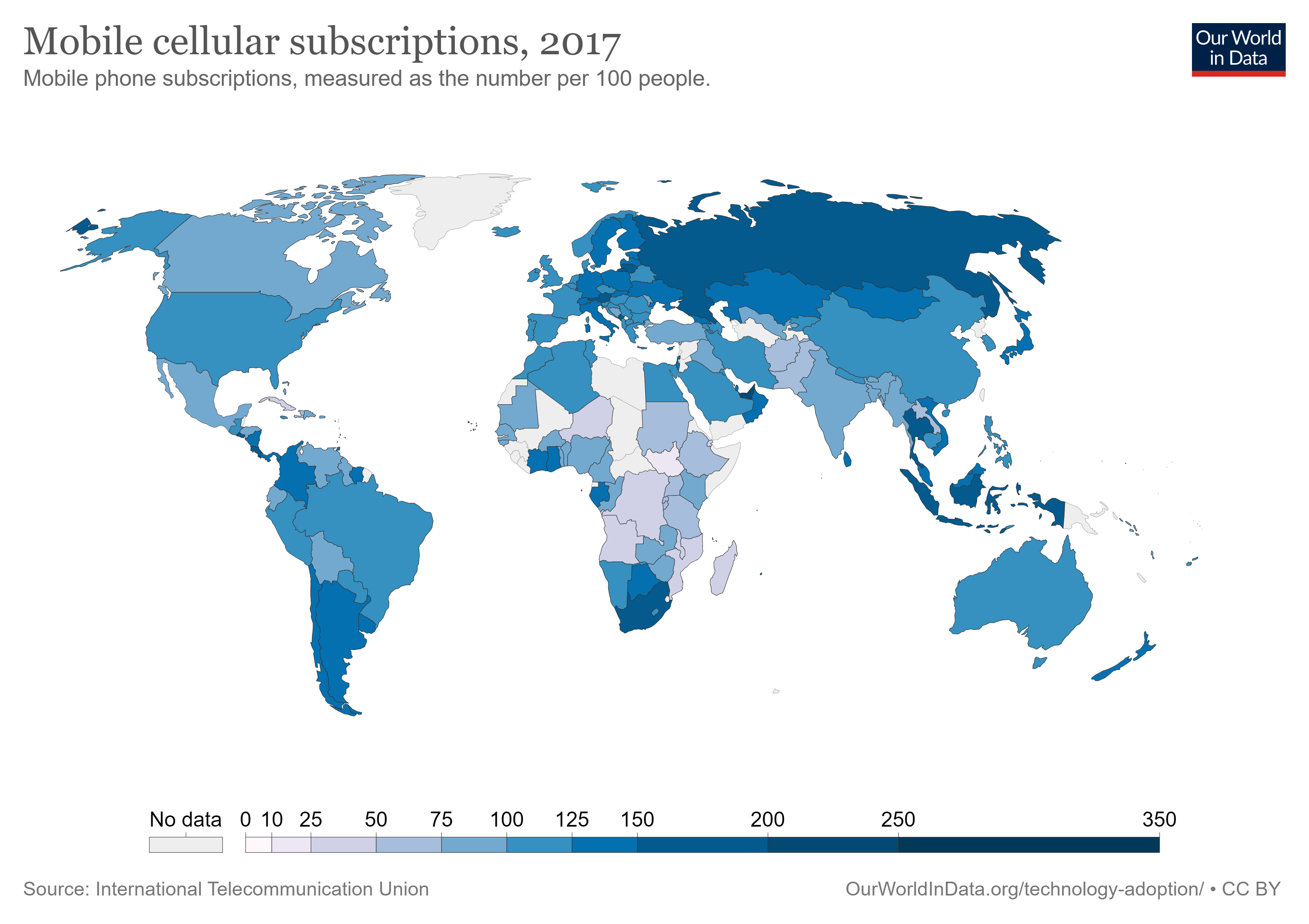
SDG Indicator 9.A.1 Map as at 2017: Total official flows for infrastructure, by recipient.

=== Target 9.b: Support domestic technology development and industrial diversification ===
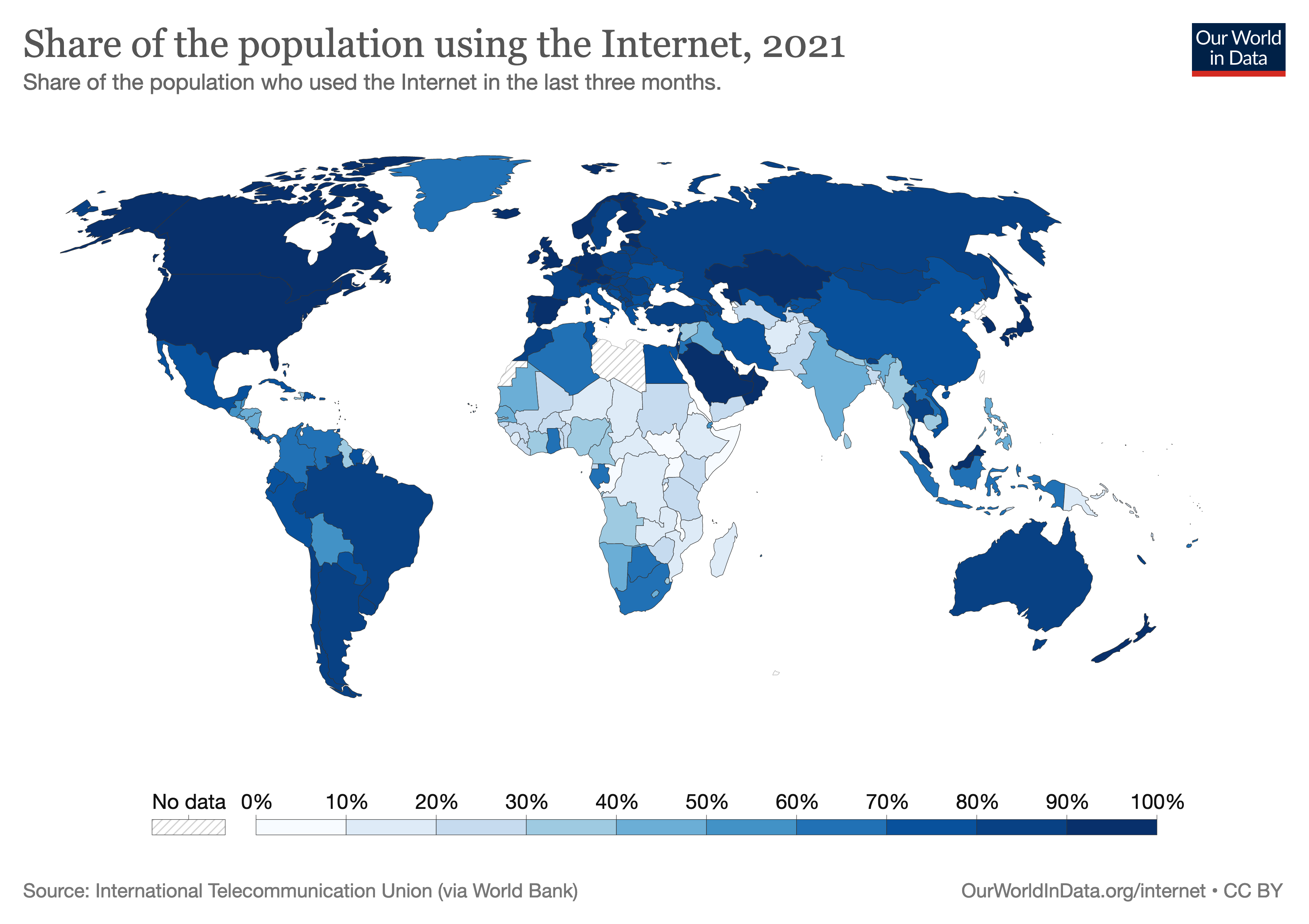
World map for indicator 9.c.1 in 2017: Share of the population using the Internet.

Target 9.b is: "Support domestic technology development, research and innovation in developing countries, including by ensuring a conducive policy environment for, inter alia, industrial diversification and value addition to commodities".

It has one indicator: "Proportion of medium and high-tech industry value added in total value added"

=== Target 9.c: Universal access to information and communications technology ===
Target 9.c is: "Significantly increase access to information and communications technology and strive to provide universal and affordable access to the Internet in least developed countries by 2020".

It has one indicator: "Proportion of population covered by a mobile network, by technology"

Mobile-cellular signal coverage is this target's indicator and has improved a great deal. In previously "unconnected" areas of the globe, 85 percent of people now live in covered areas. Planet-wide, 95% of the population was covered in 2017.

Millions of people are still unable to access the internet due to cost, coverage, and other reasons. It is estimated that just 53% of the world's population are currently internet users. Estimates suggest that by the end of 2020, the world will have reached just 57% global internet use and 23% in least developed countries, missing target 9.c by a wide margin.

== Challenges ==
=== COVID-19 Pandemic ===
Even before the COVID-19 pandemic began in 2020, the world manufacturing growth was said to be declining. The pandemic hit industries hard and caused disruptions in value chains of goods and their supply, and has affected the digitization of business and services such as video conferencing, healthcare, teleworking etc.

== Monitoring ==
High-level progress reports for all the SDGs are published in the form of reports by the United Nations Secretary General, the most recent one is from April 2020. The report before that was from May 2019. Updates and progress can also be found on the SDG website that is managed by the United Nations.

== Custodian agencies ==
The custodian agencies are responsible for data gathering and reporting on the indicators. They are:-

- For Indicator 9.1.1: World Bank (WB)
- For Indicator 9.1.2: International Civil Aviation Organization (ICAO) and International Transport Forum- Organisation for Economic Co-operation and Development (ITF-OECD)
- Both indicators under Target 9.2 and for Indicator 9.3.1 and Indicator 9.b.1: United Nations Industrial Development Organization (UNIDO).
- For Indicator 9.3.2: United Nations Industrial Development Organization (UNIDO) and World Bank (WB)
- For the two indicator under Target 9.4:United Nations Industrial Development Organization (UNIDO) and International Energy Agency (IEA)
- For the two Indicators under Target 9.5: UNESCO Institute for Statistics (UNESCO-UIS)
- For Indicator 9.a.1: Organisation for Economic Co-operation and Development (OECD)
- For Indicator 9.c.1: International Telecommunication Union (ITU)

== Links with other SDGs ==
SDG 9 "Industries, Innovation, & Infrastructure", like every other SDG, has a direct impact on the other 16 SDGs.

== Organizations ==
=== UN system ===
- United Nations Industrial Development Organization (UNIDO)
- World Bank (WB)
- International Civil Aviation Organization (ICAO)
- International Transport Forum-Organisation for Economic Co-operation and Development (ITF-OECD)
- International Energy Agency (IEA)
- UNESCO Institute for Statistics (UNESCO-UIS)
- Organisation for Economic Co-operation and Development (OECD)
- International Telecommunication Union (ITU)
