= UNESCO Institute for Statistics =

International organization

Institute for Statistics of UNESCO
- UIS logo
- Type: Cross-nationally comparable statistics
- Abbreviation: UIS
- Member of: UNESCO
- Seat: Montreal, Quebec, Canada
- Formation: 1999
- Website: uis.unesco.org

The UNESCO Institute for Statistics (UIS) is the statistical office of UNESCO and is the UN depository for cross-nationally comparable statistics on education, science and technology, culture, and communication.

The UIS was established in 1999. Based in Montreal, Quebec, Canada, it was created by a collaboration between Université de Montréal, the INRS and UNESCO to provide statistics for the UN.

The institute serves member states of UNESCO as well as intergovernmental and nongovernmental organisations, research institutes, universities, and citizens. All data is available for free.

Its offices are based at Côte-des-Neiges on the main campus of Université de Montréal, in building 3333 Queen-Mary Road.

The institute provides education data to many global reports and databases, such as the SDG global database of the UN Stats Division, the Global Education Monitoring Report, World Development Indicators and World Development Report (World Bank), Human Development Report (UNDP), and State of the World's Children (UNICEF).

Sex-disaggregated indicators are systematically integrated into all UIS data collections.

== Services ==
- Collecting, processing, verifying, analysing, and disseminating high-quality, relevant, cross-nationally comparable data about education, science, culture, and communication
- Developing and maintaining appropriate methodologies and standards that reflect the challenges faced by countries at all stages of development
- Reinforcing the capacities of national statistical offices and line ministries to produce and use high-quality statistics
- Responding to the statistical needs of stakeholders while providing access to UIS data to a wide range of users
- Providing open access to UIS data and other products to different types of users, such as governments, international and nongovernmental organisations, foundations, researchers, journalists, and the public

== Areas of work ==
=== Program highlights ===
- Largest repository of education data: The UIS is the repository of the world's most comprehensive education database. More than 200 countries and territories participate in the UIS annual education survey, which is the basis for calculating a wide range of indicators, from female enrollment in primary education to the mobility of higher education students. The UIS is the official data source for Sustainable Development Goal 4 – Education 2030.
- Technical Co-operation Group for SDG 4 – Education 2030 builds consensus on the SDG 4 measurement agenda and provides the opportunity for member states, multilateral agencies, and civil society groups to make recommendations to the UIS, which is responsible for coordinating the technical work needed to define and implement the global and thematic indicators.
- Global Alliance to Monitor Learning provides concrete solutions to develop new indicators and set standards in learning assessment, aiming to produce the first internationally comparable measures of learning for youth and adults. It brings together technical experts from countries, partner agencies, assessment organisations, donors, and civil society groups from around the world.
- Inter-Agency Group on Education Inequality Indicators sets the standards across the UN system to report household survey data and develop new measures of equity.
- International Observatory on Equity and Inclusion in Education fosters and develops the methodologies, guidelines, and research needed to build a global repository of data and standards to measure equity in education
- ISCED classification: The International Standard Classification of Education (ISCED) facilitates comparisons of education statistics and indicators across countries on the basis of uniform and internationally agreed definitions.
- Education finance: The institute works closely with national statisticians and partners to improve the collection, analysis, and use of finance indicators, especially in sub-Saharan Africa. This information is critical for managing education systems, especially in the context of budget constraints.
- Global Initiative on Out-of-School Children: UNICEF and the UIS are working together to help countries reduce the number of out-of-school children. The initiative is designed to improve the data and analysis on out-of-school children in order to better identify the factors limiting their opportunities to pursue education and analyse existing interventions, identify barriers, and develop realistic strategies to increase enrolment and sustain attendance rates.
- Statistics on teachers: The UIS annually provides projections on the number of teachers required to achieve Education for All goals. The institute also produces a range of indicators on the gender, qualifications, and working conditions of teachers around the world.
- Science, technology and innovation (STI) statistics: The UIS tracks the human and financial investments in research and development worldwide through its biennial R&D survey, which will be complemented by a new survey on innovation. The institute also works with national statisticians to ensure that international surveys accurately reflect the contexts shaping STI in developing and middle-income countries.
- Global survey on cultural employment: By working closely with countries around the world, the institute is producing a unique set of internationally comparable indicators that countries can use to answer key questions, such as:
  - What is the size of the cultural labor force?
  - What kinds of working conditions do these people face?
  - What is the social status of women in cultural employment?

=== UIS open data ===
All UIS data is freely available in different formats.

Designed for expert users, the UIS database is an online resource that provides country profiles, indicators, and data series in UNESCO's fields of competence, tools to build statistical tables, related documentation, and metadata. Developers and researchers can also use an API to download UIS data in machine-readable formats.

General users can explore the data through a series of indicator pages that present charts and tables that can easily be customised, shared, and downloaded.

The UIS also has a data visualisation gallery that features interactive products on key issues, such as women in science, children out of school, and girls’ education in Africa.

=== Capacity building ===
The institute works with national statisticians and policymakers to improve data quality by providing training, diagnostic tools, standard, and guidelines on the collection, analysis, and use of statistical information. These services take many forms, from regional training workshops to on-site technical assistance projects through the UIS network of statistical advisers in the field.

=== Research and analysis ===
The UIS provides analytical services in a number of critical policy areas, such as exclusion from education, education quality, education finance, investments in research and development, etc.

=== Publications ===
The UIS publishes statistical and analytical reports in addition to methodological guides and international classifications. The institute's flagship publication, the Sustainable Development Data Digest, is available in several UN languages.

The institute also produces a series of e-atlases, using interactive maps and charts to present the data on key issues, such as Sustainable Development Goal 4 – Education 2030, gender inequality in education, literacy, teachers, and global trends in R&D.

== Governance ==
As an autonomous organisation, the UIS has its own governing board that consists of 12 experts from different regions and organisational backgrounds. The board's primary tasks are to ensure the independence of the institute, define UIS policy and its broad functions, and approve its program and budget. In addition, the board monitors, evaluates, and advises on the institute's operations.

== Data and publications ==
UIS publishes statistical data, classifications, methodological resources and analytical studies. Its principal data products and main resources include:

- UIS Data Browser – an online platform providing access to datasets, metadata, visualizations, a data application programming interface (API) and bulk downloads;
- Statistical standards and classifications – including the International Standard Classification of Education (ISCED), the UNESCO Framework for Cultural Statistics and metadata for SDG indicators;
- Methodological and technical resources – including manuals, technical guidelines, glossaries and methodological documentation to support national statistical systems. These resources include the LASER, a framework for assessing national data ecosystems across five components: Learning Assessment, Administrative data, Survey systems, Expenditure data, Review and monitoring
- Global monitoring resources – including SDG datasets, country profiles, dashboards and the SDG 4 Scorecard. Through the Global Alliance to Monitor Learning (GAML), the Institute supports the development of internationally comparable methodologies and knowledge products for measuring learning outcomes under SDG 4, including the Global Proficiency Framework (GPF), and guidance on Minimum Proficiency Levels (MPL).
- Analytical publications – including thematic reports, technical papers and statistical analyses in UNESCO's areas of competence. Notable publications include World Education Statistics, and statistical reports on education finance, culture, research and development, and SDG monitoring. UIS data also underpin a range of UNESCO publications, including the Global Education Monitoring Report and the UNESCO science report.
