= CONCORD =

CONCORD Europe
- Confédération européenne des ONG d'urgence et de dévelopement
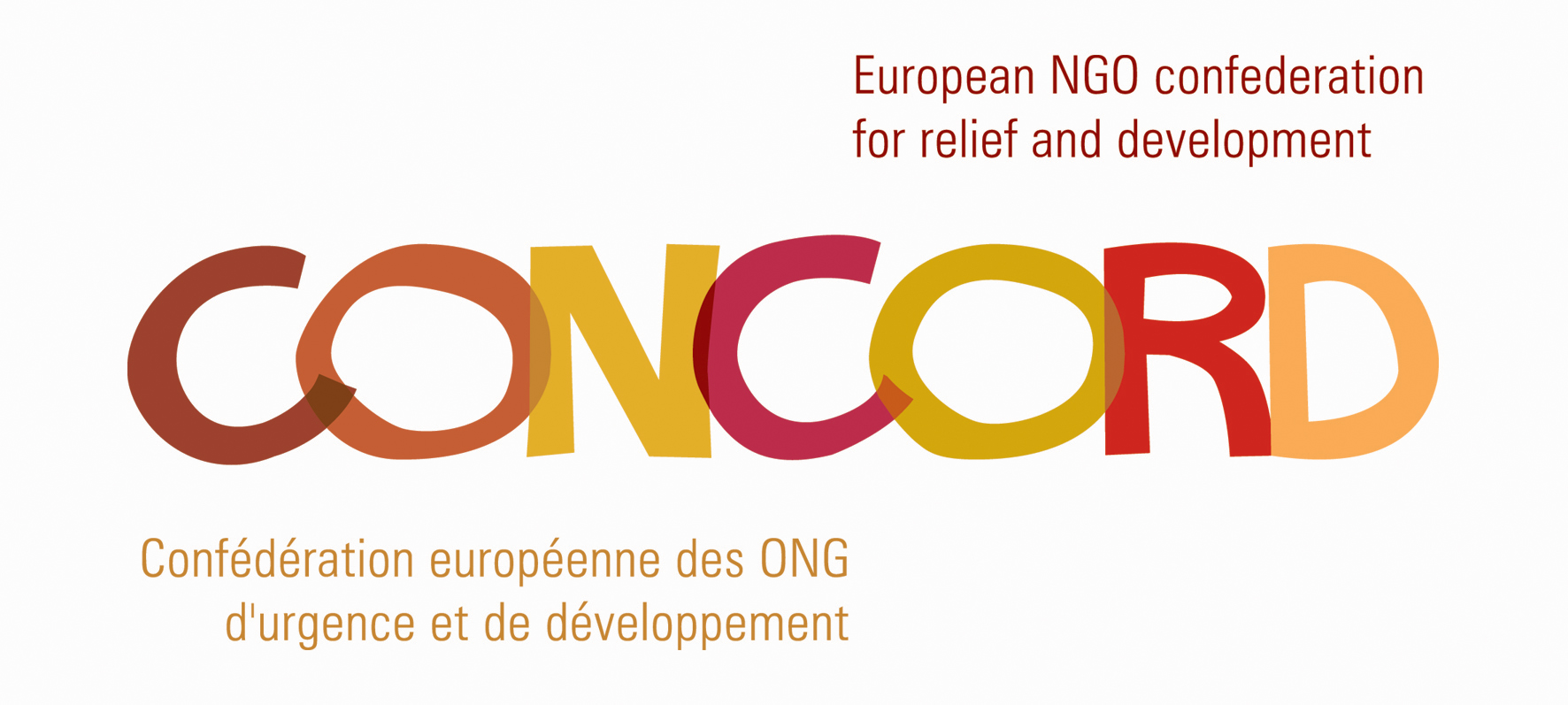
- Logo with the previous name of the organisation
- Formation: July 10, 1980; 46 years ago
- Type: International non-profit association (aisbl)
- Registration no.: 0420.549.636
- Purpose: advocacy
- Location: Brussels, Belgium
- Members: 57 (2024)
- Official language: English
- Director: Tanya Cox
- President: Rilli Lappalainen
- Budget: €1,754,000 (2022)
- Expenses: €1,754,000 (2022)
- Funding: Structural EU grant, membership fees, Gates Foundation, and others
- Staff: 21 (2024)
- Website: concordeurope.org

CONCORD, also referred to as CONCORD Europe, is the European confederation of non-governmental organisations working on sustainable development and international development cooperation.

It was established in its current form in 2003 and is the main NGO interlocutor with the EU institutions on development policy. As of 2024 it was made up of 57 member organisations, which are national NGO platforms and international NGO networks, representing more than 2,600 NGOs.

The stated goal of the Confederation is to enhance the impact of European development NGOs by combining expertise and accountability. Since 2003, CONCORD has reviewed and protested the EU's policies and practices relation to overseas aid and its commitment to the UN Millennium Development Goals and Sustainable Development Goals, policy coherence for development and funding issues.

CONCORD maintains a secretariat based in Brussels, Belgium.

== History ==
The organisation was registered in Belgium in 1980 but established by development NGOs from across Europe in its current form in 2003. CONCORD is an acronym for CONfederation for COoperation of Relief and Development NGOs. This name is no longer used and CONCORD is now describing itself as "European Confederation of NGOs working on sustainable development and international cooperation".

== EU Development Policy ==
The EU and its member states are the world's biggest donors of official development assistance. A major area of work for EU development policy operates within the Cotonou agreement which establishes a relationship between the EU and African, Caribbean and Pacific states related to development policy. EU action in the field of development is based on the European Consensus on Development, signed on 20 December 2005, whereby EU Member States, the Council, the European Parliament and the European Commission agreed to a common EU vision of development.

EU partnerships and dialogue with developing countries promote respect for human rights, fundamental freedoms, peace, democracy, good governance, and gender equality, the rule of law, solidarity and justice through global education. The European Community's contribution is focused on certain areas of intervention, responding to the needs of partner countries.

== Publications ==
CONCORD publishes AidWatch, an annual report on the EU's aid policy. In 2011, the AidWatch report criticised EU members states for increasingly tying overseas development aid to specific domestic and foreign policy goals, inflating aid by 5billion Euros.

CONCORD also publishes a report every 2 years on Policy Coherence for Development (PCD), a legal provision under the EU Lisbon Treaty. PCD aims to ensure that the external impacts of other EU policies do not undermine the aims and objectives of EU development cooperation.

In 2010, CONCORD published its Narrative on Development. The report outlines that European Union Development policies should not pursue unilateral European interests. Legally, they are to support sustainable and human development in developing countries.

== Partners ==
At global level, CONCORD is actively involved in the Open Forum for CSO Development Effectiveness, the Beyond 2015 campaign, The Humanitarian Forum international network of NGOs and BetterAid. Through these collaborations CONCORD engages with similar NGO networks from South America, Asia and Africa. It's also a partner of Arab NGO Network for Development (ANND) and Mesa

== Members ==
As of June 2024, CONCORD counts 57 member organisations, among which 26 national platforms and 24 other NGO networks:

Type	Country	Member organisation
National Platform	Austria	Globale Verantwortung
National Platform	Belgium	CONCORD Belgium
National Platform	Bulgaria	Българска Платформа за Международно развитие (BPID)
National Platform	Croatia	CROSOL
National Platform	Czech Republic	FoRS
National Platform	Denmark	Global Focus
National Platform	Estonia	AKÜ
National Platform	France	Coordination sud
National Platform	Finland	Fingo
National Platform	Germany	VENRO
National Platform	Greece	Hellenic Platform for Development
National Platform	Hungary	HAND
National Platform	Ireland	Dóchas
National Platform	Italy	Concord Italia
National Platform	Latvia	LAPAS
National Platform	Luxembourg	Cercle de coopération
National Platform	Malta	SKOP
National Platform	Netherlands	Partos
National Platform	Poland	Grupa Zagranica
National Platform	Portugal	Plataforma Portuguesa das Organizações Não-Governamentais para o Desenvolvimento (ONGD)
National Platform	Romania	FOND
National Platform	Slovakia	Ambrela
National Platform	Slovenia	SLOGA
National Platform	Spain	Coordinadora ONG
National Platform	Sweden	CONCORD Sweden
National Platform	United Kingdom	British Overseas NGOs for Development (BOND)
Network	—	ACT Alliance EU
Network	—	Action Aid
Network	—	ADRA EU
Network	—	Alliance2015
Network	—	CARE International
Network	—	
Network	—	Caritas Europa
Network	—	ChildFund Alliance
Network	—	CIDSE
Network	—	EU-CORD
Network	—	Global Network of Civil Society Organisations for Disaster Reduction (GNDR)
Network	—	Habitat for Humanity
Network	—	Humanity & Inclusion
Network	—	IPPF European Network
Network	—	Light for the World
Network	—	Oxfam International
Network	—	Plan International
Network	—	Save the Children International
Network	—	Solidar
Network	—	SOS Children's Villages International
Network	—	Terre des hommes
Network	—	Women Engage for Common Future
Network	—	Wetlands International Europe
Network	—	World Vision International
Network	—	World Wide Fund for Nature
Associate member	—	European Association for Local Democracy (ALDA)
Associate member	—	Center for the Advancement of Research and Development in Educational Technology (CARDET)
Associate member	—	European Association for the Education of Adults (EAEA)
Associate member	—	European Disability Forum
Associate member	—	EU Partnership for Democracy
Associate member	—	International Rescue Committee
Associate member	—	Norwegian Refugee Council
