= VENRO =

Logo of VENRO in English

VENRO (Association of German Development and Humanitarian Aid NGOs) is the umbrella organisation of development non-governmental organisations (NGOs) in Germany. The organisation was founded in 1995 and consists of 124 members. Their backgrounds lie in independent and church-related development cooperation, humanitarian aid as well as development education, public relations and advocacy.

VENRO is a member of the European umbrella organisation CONCORD.

VENRO's central goal is to construct a just globalisation, with a special emphasis on eradicating global poverty. The organisation is committed to implementing human rights and conserving natural resources.

VENRO represents the interests of NGOs vis-à -vis the federal government. The organisation represents the variety of development organisations and acts as a forum where positions and opinions can be developed. It engages in lobbying and watches and comments on state policies concerning developing countries. It is a sought-after dialogue partner for decision makers in politics and society.

VENRO works for a forward-looking development policy as laid out in the Agenda 21 and the Millennium Development Goals, and is committed to global structural policy. The association aims to help NGOs step up their efforts to achieve more justice in the world and to ensure that they can do even more to fight poverty, enforce human rights and preserve the natural bases of living.
