= Light for the World =

Disability organization based in Austria

- Formation: 1988, Vienna, Austria
- Type: Non-governmental organization
- Purpose: International development, blindness prevention, disability rights, community based rehabilitation, inclusive education
- Headquarters: Vienna, Austria
- Region served: Worldwide
- Members: International Disability and Development Consortium, The International Agency for the Prevention of Blindness, CONCORD
- CEO: Marion Lieser
- Budget: €21.95 million (2019)
- Staff: ~200
- Website: www.light-for-the-world.org

Light for the World is an international disability and development NGO aiming at an inclusive society. The organisation currently supports projects in Sub-Saharan Africa — including: Burkina Faso, Ethiopia, Kenya, Mozambique, South Sudan and Uganda dedicated to the restoration of eyesight, prevention of blindness, rehabilitation of persons with disabilities, inclusive education and promotion of their human rights.

== Organisation ==
Following a major change in governance in early 2016, the organisational structure of Light for the World is that of an international organisation with fully integrated core members and autonomous associated members. In 2008 a formal agreement of confederation had been signed by member organisations in Austria, Belgium and Czech Republic in order to strengthen collaboration and improve opportunities to distribute funds and resources. In April 2011, Dutch NGO Dark and Light joined Light for the World. Country Offices currently operate in Burkina Faso, Ethiopia, Kenya, Mozambique, South Sudan, and Uganda.

Core members:

- Licht für die Welt - Christoffel Entwicklungszusammenarbeit (Austria)
- Svĕtlo pro Svĕt (Czech Republic)
- Light for the World- Licht für die Welt e.V. (Germany)
- Licht für die Welt- Lumière pour le Monde (Switzerland)
- Light for the World USA Inc. (United States of America)

Associated members:

- Licht voor de Wereld - Lumière pour le Monde (Belgium)

The overall income of the confederation Light for the World in 2019 was €21.95 million. The foundation of the work is built on the commitment of over 150,000 individuals, who account for more than 50% of total revenue. Around 23% came from public bodies – mainly the European Union, the Austrian Development Agency (ADA), and the Czech Development Cooperation.

== History ==
=== Austria ===
The Austrian organisation Licht für die Welt was founded in 1988 in Vienna under the name "Christoffel-Blindenmission Austria". Among the first projects of the young Austrian organisation were eye care units and rehabilitation programs in Ethiopia and Kenya. In 2004, the Austrian organisation changed its name to Licht für die Welt - Christoffel-Entwicklungszusammenarbeit, the German language equivalent of Light for the World. In the same year Austrian Federal President, Dr. Heinz Fischer, became patron of Licht für die Welt. In 2008 a formal agreement of confederation was signed by Light for the World in Austria, Belgium and Czech Republic in order to strengthen the collaboration in the program countries and to improve opportunities to distribute funds and resources. In 2010, Austrian Licht für die Welt and Dutch Dark and Light struck an agreement with regard to projects on which they collaborated. LICHT FÜR DIE WELT took over responsibility for projects in Ethiopia and Pakistan, and Dark and Light did the same in Nepal and Sudan.

=== Belgium ===
The Belgian organisation was founded in 1997 under the name of Christian Blind Mission Belgium. One of the first programs supported was CCBRT – an orthopaedic and eye care hospital and rehabilitation program in Dar es Salaam, Tanzania. Throughout 2003 CBM Belgium performed the first cateract surgery on children at Kabgayi Eye Hospital in Muhanga, Rwandaformer Gitarama, which is a major milestone in the organisations history. In 2008 CBM Belgium becomes Licht voor de Wereld the Dutch equivalent to Light for the World through a formal agreement of confederation, which resulted in stronger cooperation with the Austrian & Czech equivalent. In recent year milestones include: opening of Saint Joseph Eye Hospital in Likasi, Congo; the launch of an inclusive education project in Lubumbashi, Congo and the opening of the Mwangaza eye hospital in Kolwezi, Congo.

=== Czech Republic ===
In July 2007, the Czech organisation Svĕtlo pro Svĕt was founded in Prague supporting programs in Ethiopia. In 2008 Svĕtlo pro Svĕt joined a formal agreement of confederation by the organisations in Austria, Belgium and the Czech Republic in order to expand joint efforts on various programs.

=== Germany ===
Founded on 28 November 2014 Licht für die Welt Deutschland was born in Munich. In October 2015 Licht für die Welt Deutschland was one of the founding members of Light for the World International, the umbrella organization under which the different branches operate today. Due to trademark issues on the 1.1.2021 Licht für die Welt Deutschland changed their name to Light for the World - Licht für die Welt e.V..

=== The Netherlands ===
In 1982 Dark and Light was founded by Martien Cozijnsen an ophthalmologist and his wife Jenny. Dark and Light rapidly grew from a small family foundation to a major NGO in the Netherlands. In 2010, Austrian Licht für die Welt and Dutch Dark and Light struck an agreement with regard to projects on which they collaborated. Dark and Light took over responsibility for projects in Nepal and Sudan, their equal did the same in Ethiopia and Pakistan. In 2011 Dark and Light signed a confederation agreement and rebranded itself Dark and Light The Netherlands, this change formally was adapted in 2012. In 2020 Light for the World The Netherlands decided to separate themselves from the Light for the World family, on 1 January 2021 Light for the World The Netherlands became the Seeyou foundation.

=== Switzerland ===
Licht für die Welt- Lumière pour le Monde was founded on 3 December 2014 in Zurich.

=== United Kingdom ===
On 30 September 2015, Light for the World UK was founded in London. They work closely with the British Lottery Community Fund, Sightsavers and the FCDO. The UN Convention on the Rights of Persons with Disabilities plays a central role in Licht für die Welt UKs work.

=== United States ===
Looking to expand their global presence another Licht für die Welt branch was founded in May 2016 in New York. What differentiates Light for the World USA Inc. from other branches of the Light for the World family is that Light for the World USA Inc. doesn't support individual donors due to the limited resources Light for the World has in this area. Light for the World USA Inc. is participating in various medication programs founded by the US government.

== Key activities ==
Initially, prevention of blindness and restoration of eyesight were the most important sector focus in the programmatic work of Light for the World. Recent years have seen a widening of scope towards the promotion of Inclusive Education, Community Based Rehabilitation, and Disability Rights.

Light for the World commits itself to strengthening the rights of persons with disabilities and creating new opportunities, increasing mobility with the help of devices and starting initiatives that will provide education and incomes. Another objective is to raise awareness on the inclusion of persons with disabilities in their family and social environment as well as in international, regional and national contexts. Raising public awareness on the situation of persons with disabilities in developing countries vis-a-vis the United Nations and bodies of the European Union among other international actors also forms a crucial part of Light for the World's work.

Light for the World is currently active in the following partner countries: Ethiopia, Burkina Faso, South Sudan, Mozambique, Rwanda, DR Congo, Tanzania, Uganda, Bangladesh, Cambodia, Northeast India, Pakistan, Indonesia, Papua New Guinea, Bolivia, and Bosnia-Herzegovina. Former partner countries, include Haiti, Togo, Nepal, Indonesia, and Nigeria.

On its website, the organisation cites the following guiding principles in cooperation with partners in the developing world:

- Support local partners in underprivileged regions of the world in their work with and for people who are blind, have other disabilities or are at risk of becoming disabled.
- Provide help irrespective of gender, ethnicity or religion and in particular to very underprivileged groups, such as women, children, indigenous peoples and marginal groups in society.
- Act according to the needs of the people affected.
- Projects reach as many people as possible.
- Support programs leading to sustainable strengthening and social inclusion of people who are blind or have other disabilities in their communities.
- Support programs also in difficult periods and respond to current challenges with endurance, perseverance and flexibility.
- To apply efficient and economical use of funds in projects and take into consideration principles of ecological and social sustainability and fair trade whenever possible.
- Enable a global exchange of experiences regarding effective and efficient concepts in the program areas that Light for the World support.

== Ambassadors ==
Light for the World is represented by an International Board of Ambassadors, which consists of:

- Paralympics winner Henry Wanyoike
- Olympic champion Haile Gebrselassie
- Prince Maximilian of Liechtenstein
- Benita Ferrero-Waldner, former Austrian minister and EU commissioner
- Collin Allen, former president of the World Federation of the Deaf
- Colin Low, vice president of the RNIB
- Disability inclusion activist Prof. Ron McCallum

== Awards ==
Light for the World received the Zero Project Award 2023 for innovative solutions for persons with disabilities. Ahead of the 2015 National Elections in Burkina Faso it facilitated, monitored, documented, and implemented solutions that removed barriers for persons with disabilities regarding political participation. Among others, ballot papers were printed in Braille and legislative bodies hired persons with disabilities to ensure equitable elections. These good practices have further been shared with various West African stakeholders.
