= Sustainable Development Goal 17 =

Sustainable Development Goal by the UN

- Mission statement: "Strengthen the means of implementation and revitalize the global partnership for sustainable development"
- Commercial?: No
- Type of project: Non-Profit
- Location: Global
- Founder: United Nations
- Established: 2015
- Website: sdgs.un.org

Sustainable Development Goal 17 (SDG17 or Global Goal 17) advances "partnerships for the goals." As one of the 17 Sustainable Development Goals established by the United Nations in 2015, SDG17 aims to "strengthen the means of implementation and revitalize the global partnership for sustainable development." SDG17 refers to the need for the nonhegemonic and fair cross sector and cross country collaborations in pursuit of all the goals by the year 2030. The framework calls on international stakeholders to coordinate their efforts toward accomplishing the SDGs.

SDG 17 is a vision for improved and more equitable trade, as well as coordinated investment initiatives to promote sustainable development across borders. It is about strengthening and streamlining cooperation between nation-states, both developed and developing, using the SDGs as a shared framework and a shared vision for defining that collaborative way forward. It seeks to promote international trade and an equitable trading system. The Goal has 17 targets to be achieved by 2030, broken down into five categories: finance, technology, capacity building, trade and systemic issues. Progress towards targets will be measured by 25 indicators. All these targets are regarded as means of implementation targets.

With US$5 trillion to $7 trillion in annual investment required to achieve the SDGs, total official development assistance reached US$147.2 billion in 2017. This, although steady, is below the set target. In 2016, six countries met the international target to keep official development assistance at or above 0.7 percent of gross national income. In 2017, international remittances amounted US$613 billion, with 76 percent invested in developing countries. The bond market for sustainable business is also growing. In 2018 global green bonds reached US$155.5 billion, up to 78 percent from 2017.

Humanitarian crises brought on by conflict or natural disasters have continued to demand more financial resources and aid. Even so, many countries also require official development assistance to encourage growth and trade. The global progress map for SDG 17 shows that significant and major challenges remain in the majority of the world. Many regions of strong economic status perform very poorly, like the United States and much of Europe.

== Background ==
The Sustainable Development Goals are a collection of 17 global goals set by the United Nations to be implemented by the year 2030. A successful sustainable development agenda requires partnerships between governments, the private sector and civil society. These inclusive partnerships built upon principles and values, a shared vision, and shared goals that place people and the planet at the center, are needed at the global, regional, national and local level.

Sustainable Goal 17 targets long-term investments to empower sectors and companies in need, more adaptable in developmental countries. Its main aim reaches improving the following aspects of a country that include: energy, infrastructure, transportation systems, IT infrastructure to different communications technologies channels.

The framework of development covers evaluating and following up with rules and regulations, the sector's structure to attract more investment projects to the country and thus improving its economical standards.

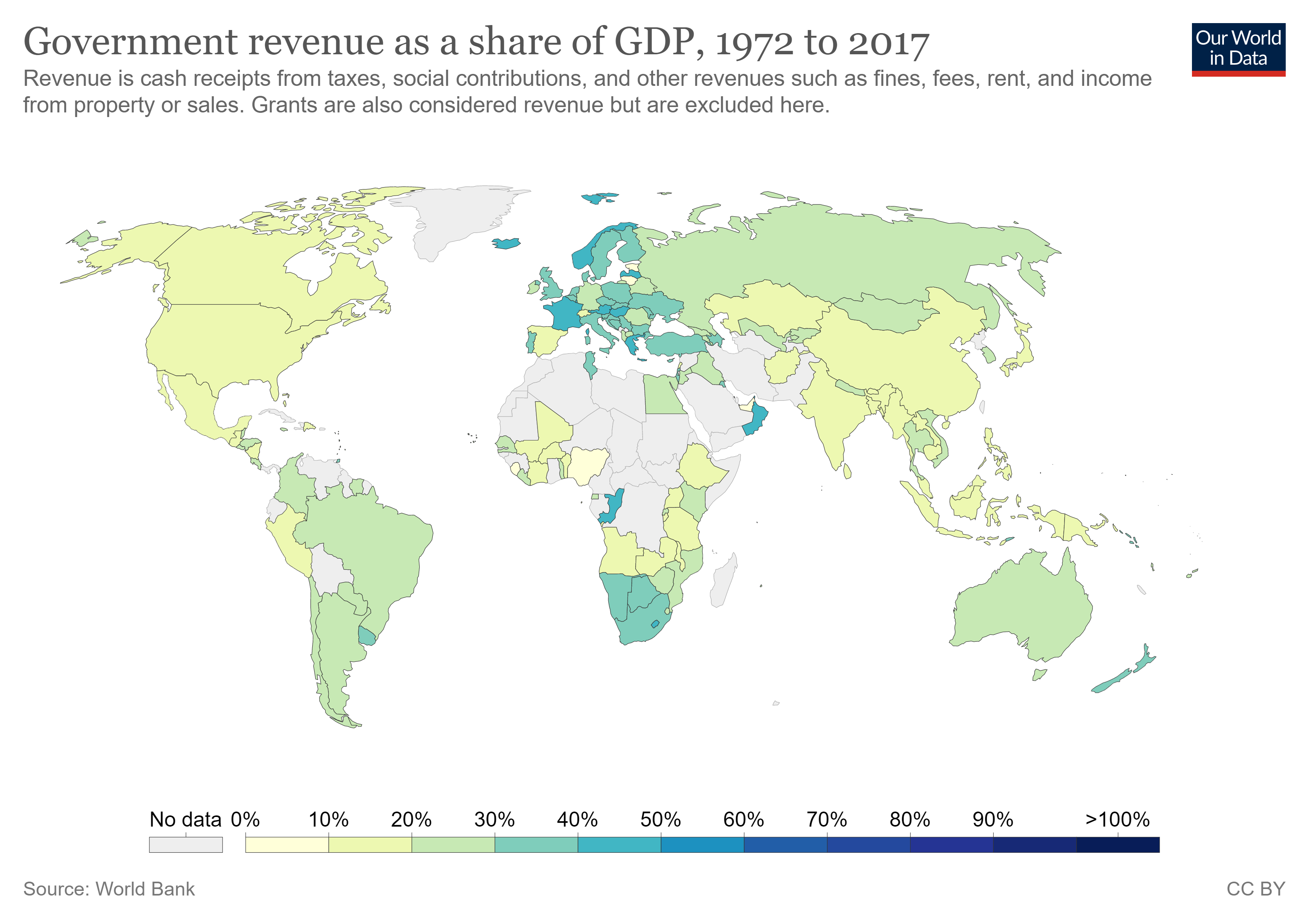
World map for indicators- 17.1.1 Government revenue as a share of GDP, 2017. Revenue is cash receipts from taxes, social contributions, and other revenues such as fines.

== Targets, indicators and progress ==
SDG 17 has 19 targets and 25 indicators. Below is the list of all the targets with a short version and a long version of the titles. For all the other indicators, data and world maps are available to visualize progress.

=== Target 17.1: Mobilize resources to improve domestic revenue collection ===
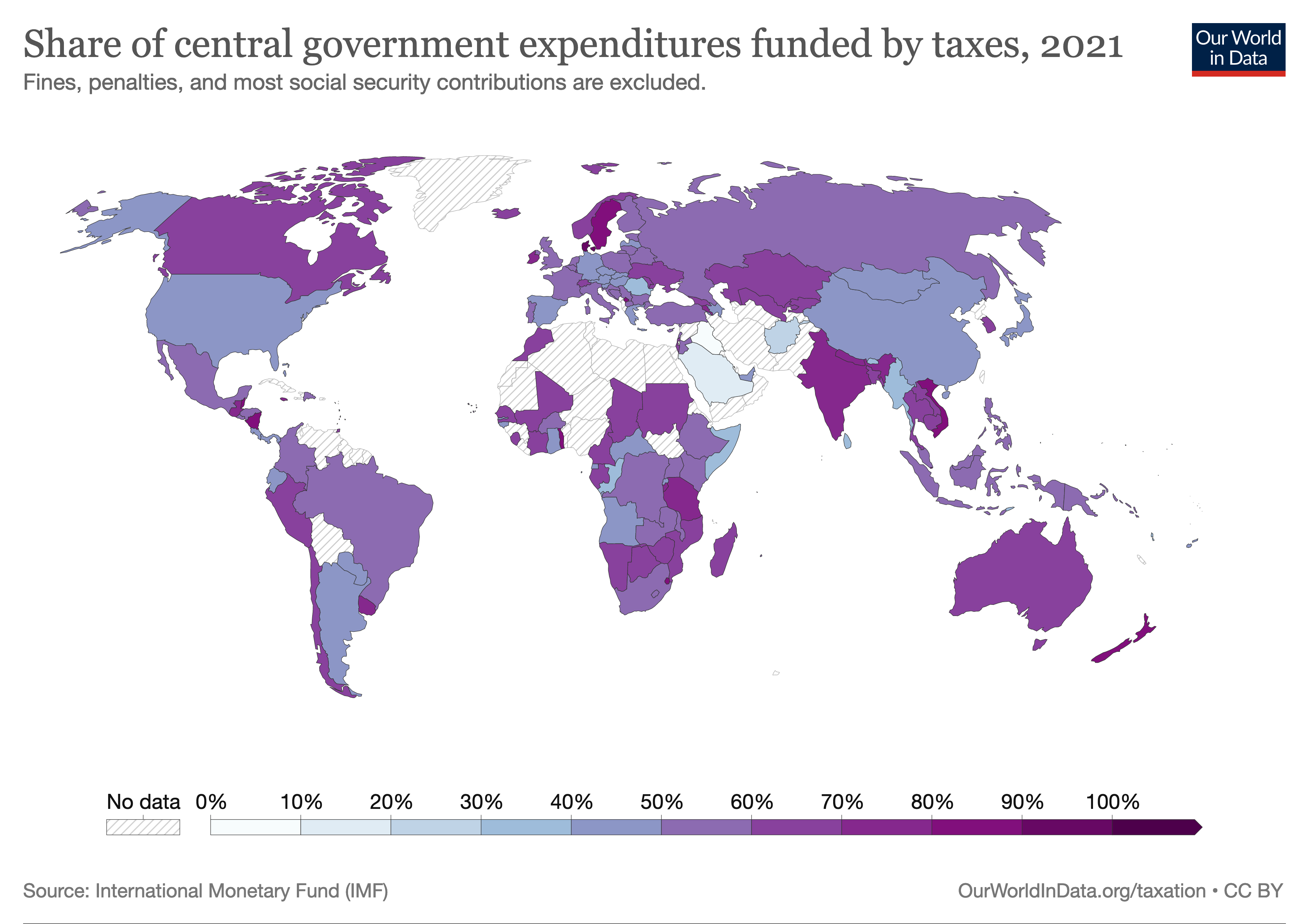
World map for indicators- 17.1.2- Proportion of domestic budget funded by domestic taxes of GDP

Target 17.1 is formulated as: "Mobilize resources to improve domestic revenue collection: Strengthen domestic resource mobilization, including through international support to developing countries, to improve domestic capacity for tax and other revenue collection."

This target has two Indicators:

- Indicator 17.1.1: Total government revenue as a proportion of GDP, by source
- Indicator 17.1.2: Proportion of domestic budget funded by domestic taxes

=== Target 17.2: Implement all development assistance commitments ===
Target 17.2 is formulated as: "Implement all development assistance commitments: Developed countries to implement fully their official development assistance commitments, including the commitment by many developed countries to achieve the target of 0.7 per cent of gross national income for official development assistance (oda/gni) to developing countries and 0.15 to 0.20 per cent of oda/gni to least developed countries; oda providers are encouraged to consider setting a target to provide at least 0.20 per cent of oda/gni to least developed countries."

This target has one Indicator: Indicator 17.2.1 is the "Net official development assistance, total and to least developed countries, as a proportion of the Organisation for Economic Co-operation and Development (OECD) Development Assistance Committee donors' gross national income (GNI)".

=== Target 17.3: Mobilize financial resources for developing countries ===
Target 17.3 is formulated as: "Mobilize financial resources for developing countries: Mobilize additional financial resources for developing countries from multiple sources."

This target has two Indicators:

- Indicator 17.3.1: Foreign direct investment, official development assistance and South-South cooperation as a proportion of gross national income
- Indicator 17.3.2: Volume of remittances (in United States dollars) as a proportion of total GDP

Some of the implications of COVID-19 are related to the fall of remittances from $554 to billions by 2019 to US$445 billion on 2020, This situation will affect low and middle income countries as well as poor households.

=== Target 17.4: Assist developing countries in attaining debt sustainability ===
Target 17.4 is formulated as: "Assist developing countries in attaining debt sustainability: Assist developing countries in attaining long-term debt sustainability through coordinated policies aimed at fostering debt financing, debt relief and debt restructuring, as appropriate, and address the external debt of highly indebted poor countries to reduce debt distress."

This target has one Indicator: Indicator 17.4.1 is the "Debt service as a proportion of exports of goods and services".

=== Target 17.5: Invest in least-developed countries ===
Target 17.5 is formulated as: "Invest in least developed countries: Adopt and implement investment promotion regimes for least developed countries."

This target has one Indicator: Indicator 17.5.1 is the "Number of countries that adopt and implement investment promotion regimes for developing countries, including the least developed countries".

"Global foreign direct investment is expected to decline by up to 40% in 2020."

=== Target 17.6: Knowledge sharing and cooperation for access to science, technology and innovation ===
Target 17.6 is formulated as: "Knowledge sharing and cooperation for access to science, technology and innovation: Enhance north-south, south-south and triangular regional and international cooperation on and access to science, technology and innovation and enhance knowledge sharing on mutually agreed terms, including through improved coordination among existing mechanisms, in particular at the united nations level, and through a global technology facilitation mechanism."

This target has one Indicator: Indicator 17.6.1 is the "Fixed Internet broadband subscriptions per 100 inhabitants, by speed". (this indicator used to be Number 17.6.2)

In 2020 it was proposed to delete the former Indicator 17.6.1 (Number of science and/or technology cooperation agreements and programs between countries, by type of cooperation).

=== Target 17.7: Promote sustainable technologies to developing countries ===
Target 17.7 is formulated as: "Promote sustainable technologies to developing countries: Promote the development, transfer, dissemination and diffusion of environmentally sound technologies to developing countries on favorable terms, including on concessional and preferential terms, as mutually agreed.

This target has one Indicator: Indicator 17.7.1 is the "Total amount of funding for developing countries to "promote the development, transfer, dissemination and diffusion of environmentally sound technologies"

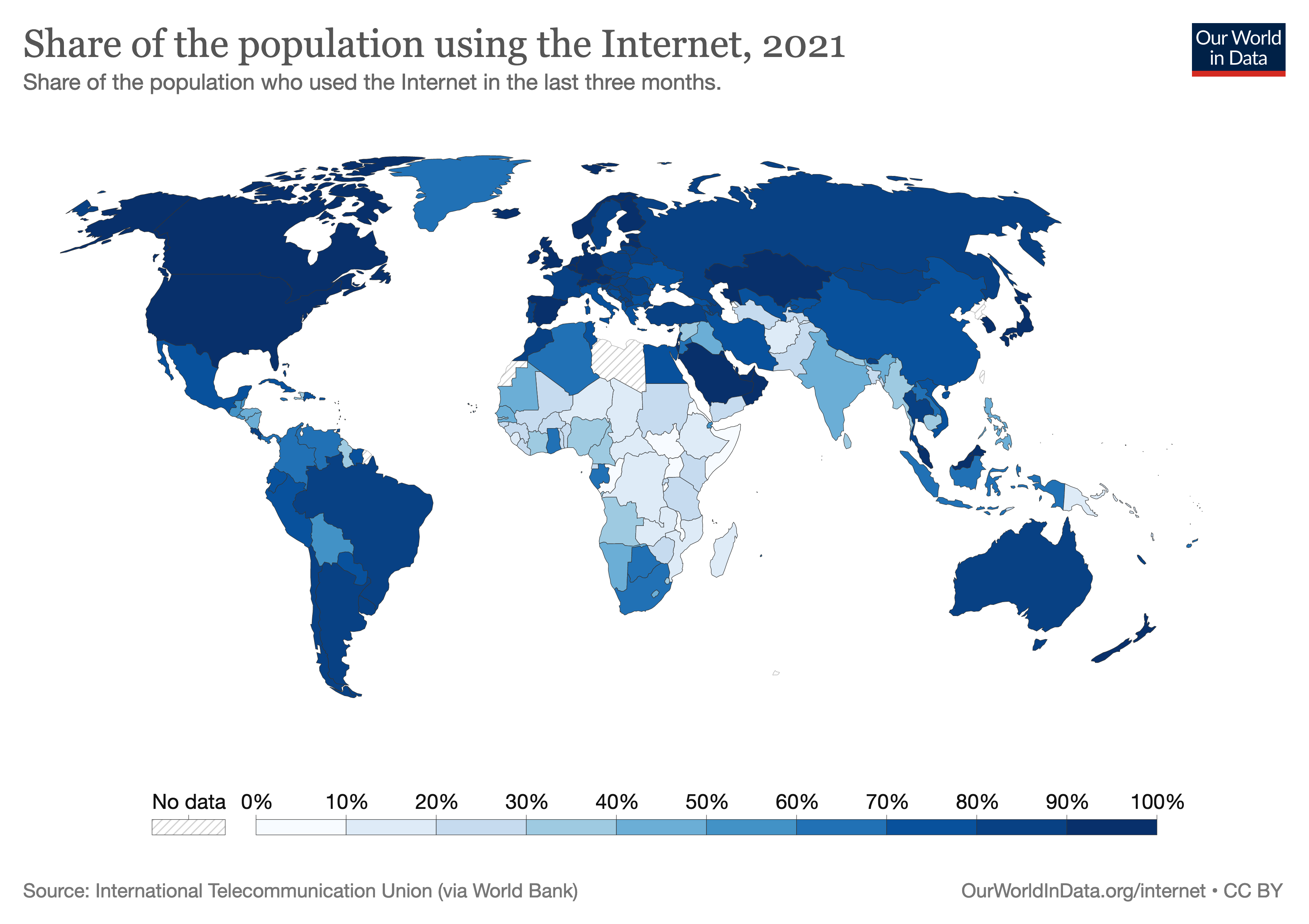
World map for indicator 17.8.1 - Proportion of individuals using the Internet in 2021

=== Target 17.8: Strengthen the science, technology and innovation capacity for least-developed countries ===
Target 17.8 is formulated as: "Strengthen the science, technology and innovation capacity for least developed countries: Fully operationalize the technology bank and science, technology and innovation capacity-building mechanism for least developed countries by 2017 and enhance the use of enabling technology, in particular information and communications technology."

This target has one Indicator: Indicator 17.8.1 is the "Proportion of individuals using the Internet".

Despite the increase of the global share related to internet access the digital divide persist.

=== Target 17.9: Enhanced SDG capacity in developing countries ===
Target 17.9 is formulated as: "Enhance SDG capacity in developing countries: Enhance international support for implementing effective and targeted capacity-building in developing countries to support national plans to implement all the sustainable development goals, including through north-south, south-south and triangular cooperation."

This target has one Indicator: Indicator 17.9.1 is the "Dollar value of financial and technical assistance (including through north–south, South‑South and triangular cooperation) committed to developing countries".

=== Target 17.10: Promote a universal trading system under the WTO ===
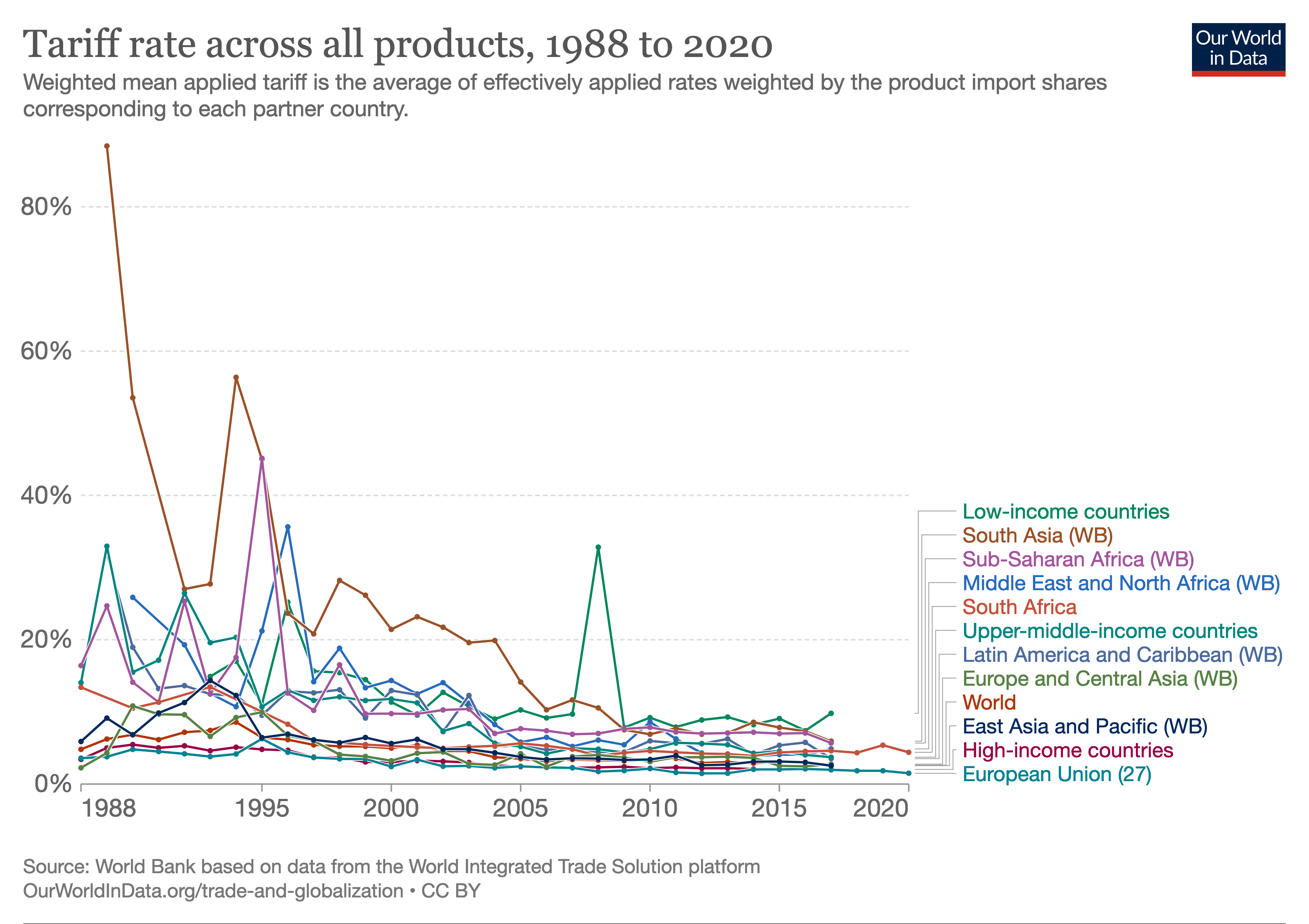
SDG Indicator 17.10.1 Chart - showing the Tariff rate across all products, 1989 to 2020

Target 17.10 is formulated as: "Promote a universal trading system under the WTO: Promote a universal, rules-based, open, non-discriminatory and equitable multilateral trading system under the world trade organization, including through the conclusion of negotiations under its Doha development agenda."

This target has one Indicator: Indicator 17.10.1 is the "Worldwide weighted tariff-average".

=== Target 17.11: Increase the exports of developing countries ===
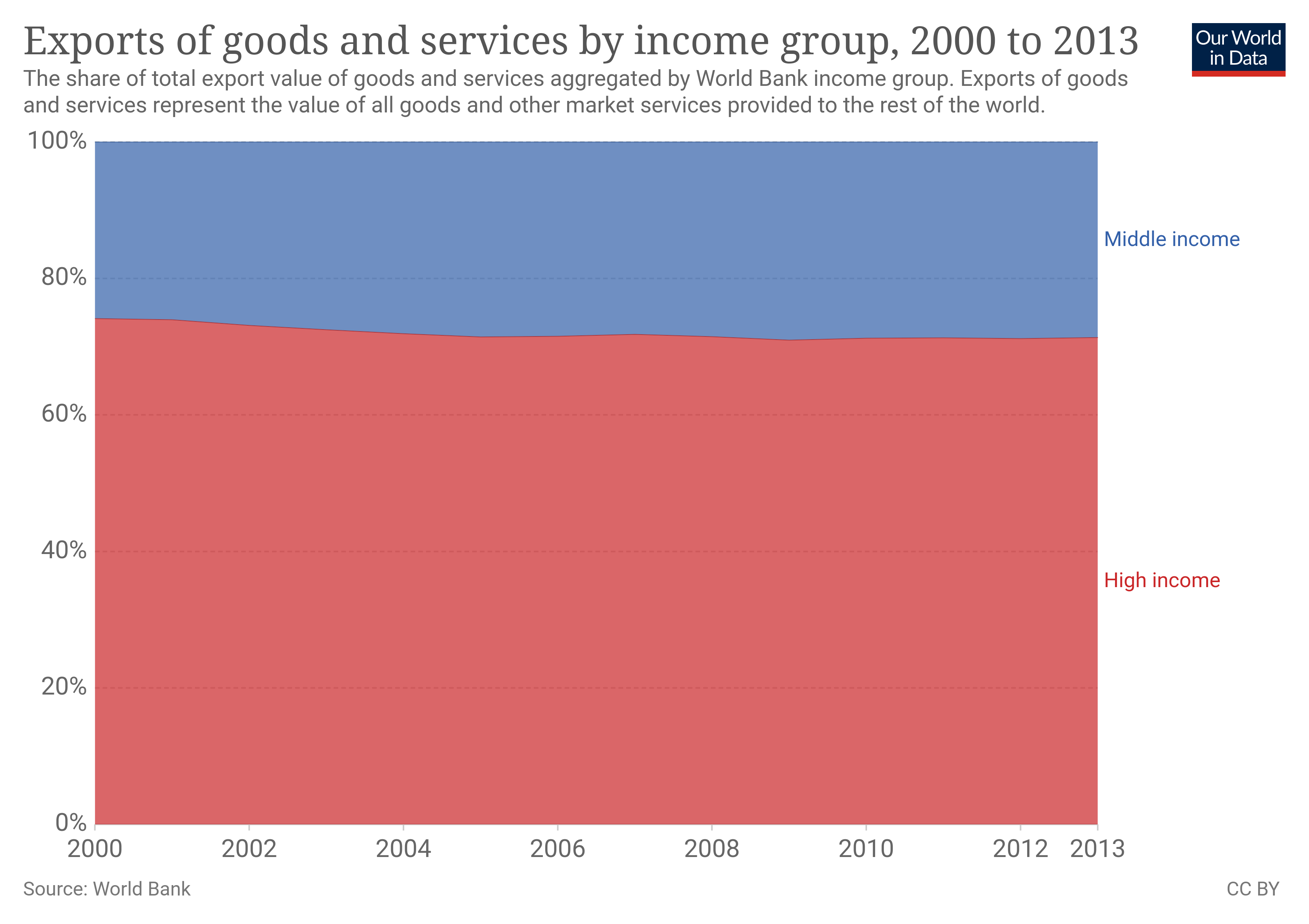
World Map Indicator 17.11.1 - Exports by income group

Target 17.11 is formulated as: "Increase the exports of developing countries: Significantly increase the exports of developing countries, in particular with a view to doubling the least developed countries' share of global exports by 2020."

This target has one Indicator: Indicator 17.11.1 is the "Developing countries' and least developed countries' share of global exports".

=== Target 17.12: Remove trade barriers for least-developed countries ===
Target 17.12 is formulated as: "Remove trade barriers for least developed countries: Realize timely implementation of duty-free and quota-free market access on a lasting basis for all least developed countries, consistent with world trade organization decisions, including by ensuring that preferential rules of origin applicable to imports from least developed countries are transparent and simple, and contribute to facilitating market access."

This target has one Indicator: Indicator 17.12.1 is the "Weighted average tariffs faced by developing countries, least developed countries and small island developing States".

=== Target 17.13: Enhance global macroeconomic stability ===
Target 17.13 is formulated as: "Enhance global macroeconomic stability: Enhance global macroeconomic stability, including through policy coordination and policy coherence." This target also highlights the need for reforms in taxation, investment, and international financial institutions such as the IMF and World Bank to better support sustainable development goal.

This target has one Indicator: Indicator 17.13.1 is the "Macroeconomic Dashboard". The "Macroeconomic Dashboard" illustrates international financial status by country. Macroeconomic dashboard includes each "country's economic condition, with measures focused on a country's trade and balance of payments, fiscal policy, gross domestic product, financial sector, and unemployment rate."

=== Target 17.14: Enhance policy coherence for sustainable development ===
Target 17.14 is formulated as: "Enhance policy coherence for sustainable development."

This target has one Indicator: Indicator 17.14.1 is the "Number of countries with mechanisms in place to enhance policy coherence of sustainable development".

A study from 2022 said that the approach to policy coherence for sustainable development in the SDGs followed a technical design logic that some argue is ineffective. It may even lead to the reproduction of incoherent policies. Institutional mechanisms can help connect different sectors, or "bridging institutional siloes". However, relying on them too much may overlook how sustainable development is actually shaped and improved.

=== Target 17.15: Respect national leadership to implement policies for the sustainable development goals ===
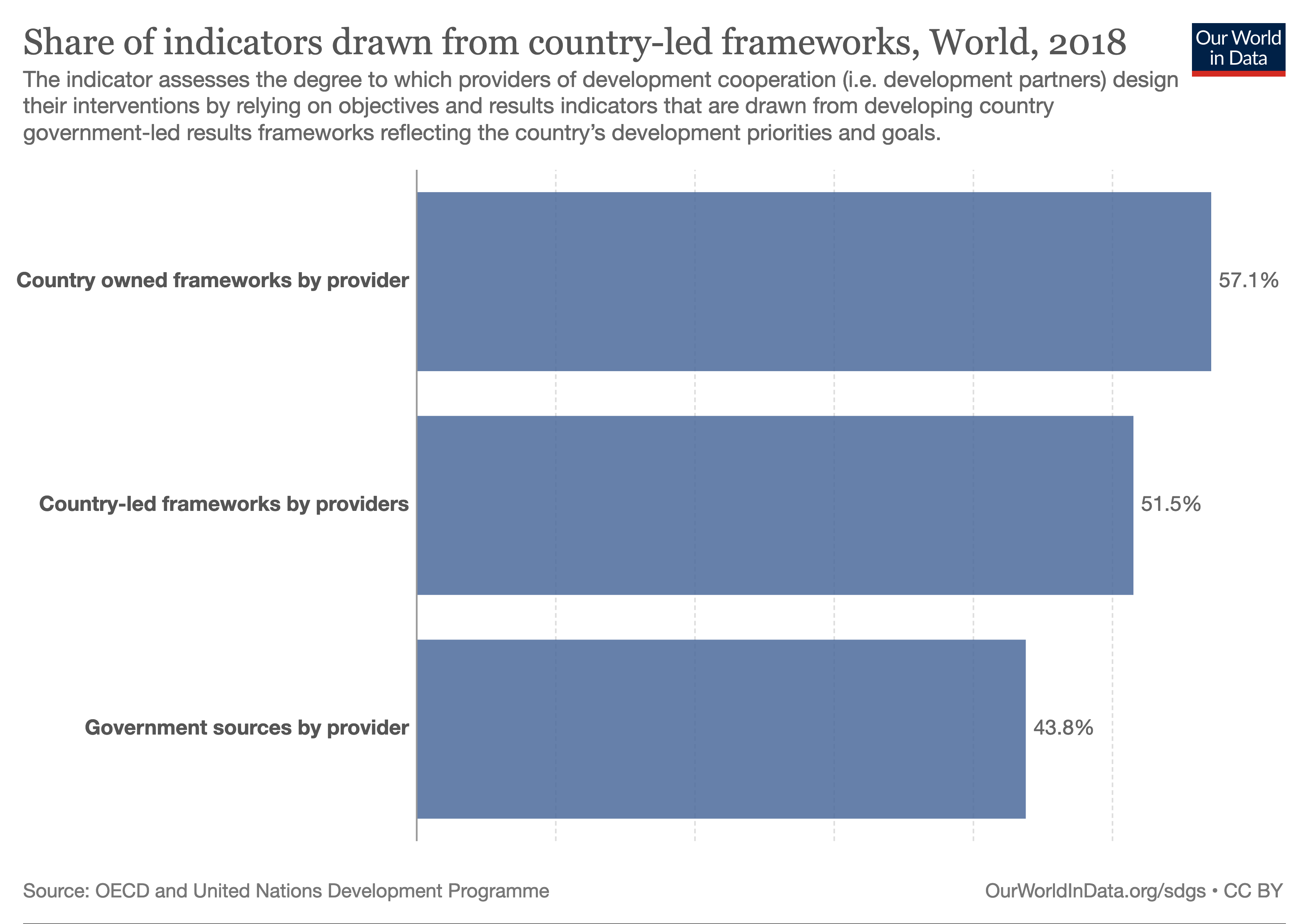
SDG Indicator 17.15.1 Map showing Proportion of results, indicators and new interventions drawn from..., World

Target 17.15 is formulated as: "Respect national leadership to implement policies for the sustainable development goals: Respect each country's policy space and leadership to establish and implement policies for poverty eradication and sustainable development."

This target has one Indicator: Indicator 17.15.1 is the "Extent of use of country-owned results frameworks and planning tools by providers of development cooperation".

=== Target 17.16: Enhance the global partnership for sustainable development ===
Target 17.16 is formulated as: "Enhance the global partnership for sustainable development: Enhance the global partnership for sustainable development, complemented by multi-stakeholder partnerships that mobilize and share knowledge, expertise, technology and financial resources, to support the achievement of the sustainable development goals in all countries, in particular developing countries."

This target has one Indicator: Indicator 17.16.1 is the "Number of countries reporting progress in multi-stakeholder development effectiveness monitoring frameworks that "support the achievement of the sustainable development goals".

=== Target 17.17: Encourage effective partnerships ===
Target 17.17 is formulated as: "Encourage effective partnerships: Encourage and promote effective public, public-private and civil society partnerships, building on the experience and resourcing strategies of partnerships." It emphasizes the importance of multi-stakeholder partnerships for sustainable development by acknowledging the contributions of different actors: governments, the private sector and civil society.

This target has one Indicator: Indicator 17.17.1 is the "Amount in United States dollars committed to public-private partnerships for infrastructure.

=== Target 17.18: Enhance availability of reliable data ===
Target 17.18 is formulated as: "Enhance availability of reliable data: By 2020, enhance capacity-building support to developing countries, including for least developed countries and small island developing states, to increase significantly the availability of high-quality, timely and reliable data disaggregated by income, gender, age, race, ethnicity, migratory status, disability, geographic location and other characteristics relevant in national contexts."

This target has three indicators:

- Indicator 17.18.1: Statistical capacity indicator for Sustainable Development Goal monitoring
- Indicator 17.18.2: Number of countries that have national statistical legislation that complies with the Fundamental Principles of Official Statistics
- Indicator 17.18.3: Number of countries with a national statistical plan that is fully funded and under implementation, by source of funding

By 2017 only the half of the funding required for data and statistics ($690 million) was mobilized.

=== Target 17.19: Further develop measurements of progress ===
Target 17.19 is formulated as: "Further develop measurements of progress: By 2030, build on existing initiatives to develop measurements of progress on sustainable development that complement gross domestic product, and support statistical capacity-building in developing countries."

This target has two indicators:

- Indicator 17.19.1: Dollar value of all resources made available to strengthen statistical capacity in developing countries
- Indicator 17.19.2: Proportion of countries that (a) have conducted at least one population and housing census in the last 10 years; and (b) have achieved 100 per cent birth registration and 80 per cent death registration

=== Custodian agencies ===
Custodian agencies are in charge of reporting on the following indicators:

- Indicator 17.1.1 and 17.1.2: International Monetary Fund (IMF)
- Indicator 17.2.1 and 17.9.1: Organisation for Economic Co-operation and Development (OECD)
- Indicator 17.3.1: Organisation for Economic Co-operation and Development (OECD) and UN Conference on Trade and Development (UNCTAD)
- Indicator 17.3.2, 17.4.1 and 17.17.1: World Bank (WB)
- Indicator 17.5.1: UN Conference on Trade and Development (UNCTAD)
- Indicator 17.6.1: UNESCO Institute for Statistics (UNESCO-UIS)
- Indicator 17.6.2: International Telecommunication Union (ITU)
- Indicator 17.7.1: United Nations Environmental Programme-Climate Technology Centre and Network (UNEP-CTCN)
- Indicator for 17.8.1: International Telecommunication Union (ITU)
- Indicator 17.10.1, 17.11.1, 17.12.1 and 17.13.1: World Trade Organization (WTO), International Trade Centre (ITC) and United Nations Conference on Trade and Development (UNCTAD)
- Indicator 17.14.1: United Nations Environmental Programme (UNEP)
- Indicator 17.15.1 and 17.16.1: Organisation for Economic Co-operation and Development (OECD) and United Nations Development Programme (UNDP)
- Indicator 17.18.1 and 17.19.2: Department of Economic and Social Affairs-Statistics Division (DESA-UNSD)
- Indicator 17.18.2 and 17.18.3: PARIS 21
- Indicator 17.19.1: PARIS 23

== Public-Private Partnerships ==
The United Nations' Sustainable Development Goal 17 target 17.17 is formulated as: "Encourage effective partnerships: Encourage and promote effective public, public–private and civil society partnerships, building on the experience and resourcing strategies of partnerships." The success of this target is measured by the amount in United States dollars committed to public–private partnerships for infrastructure worldwide.

Public-Private Partnerships (PPPs) are described by Tiziano Peccia and collaborators as important instruments for advancing the Sustainable Development Goals (SDGs) established by the United Nations (UN). Their research argues that PPPs facilitate cooperation between governments, private companies, scientific institutions, and civil society by mobilizing resources, innovation, and technical expertise for sustainable development. The authors also emphasize that effective implementation of the SDGs requires "capillary approaches", connecting local initiatives with global governance structures through science diplomacy and decentralized international cooperation.

According to Peccia et al., the United Nations plays a central coordinating role in achieving the SDGs through multilevel cooperation among public institutions, the private sector, academia, and local communities. PPPs are presented as strategic tools capable of accelerating sustainable development by combining public legitimacy with private-sector innovation and investment capacity. The authors argue that the UN should also function as a facilitator linking grassroots initiatives and local scientific networks with international policy frameworks in order to strengthen inclusive and sustainable global governance.

However, Peccia et al. also underline the importance of monitoring Public-Private Partnerships to avoid risks such as "bluewashing" and "private washing", where private actors may use association with the United Nations or the Sustainable Development Goals mainly for reputational benefit rather than genuine sustainable impact. They argue that transparent evaluation, accountability mechanisms, ethical oversight, and continuous monitoring are necessary to ensure that PPPs remain aligned with public interest, social inclusion, and the effective implementation of the SDGs.

== Monitoring and progress ==
High-level progress reports for all the SDGs are published in the form of reports by the United Nations Secretary General. The most recent one is from April 2020.

== Challenges ==
Challenges include the absence of data, trade tensions and COVID-19. In particular, a drastic resurgence in geopolitical tensions and nationalism threatens to undermine cooperation on the SDGs.

=== Impacts of the Covid-19 pandemic ===
The UN Secretary-General gave a development of strategy that spread out a dream for how the global network can show a powerful, organized reaction to the COVID-19 pandemic. The 2020 Financing for Economical Advancement Report traces measures to address the effect of the unpacked worldwide back down and financial crisis, particularly within the world's poorest nations. To support the poor communities they also started a UN Reaction and Trust Fund. Instead, remittances to low income countries are expected to fall and global investment is expected to decline by 40% owing to the pandemic.

== Criticism ==
=== Partnerships with private finance ===
There are concerns that Target 17.17 could undermine the rest of the SDGs. Indeed, according to a 2018 UN Report, "in terms of costs, private finance is more expensive than public finance, and public-private partnerships can also incur high design, management and transactional costs due to their complexity and the need for external advice". In addition, negotiations of these public-private partnerships can cause project delays of some years.

== Organizations ==
The following United Nations organizations are involved in SDG 17, being custodians of one or several indicators:

- International Monetary Fund (IMF)
- Organisation for Economic Co-operation and Development (OECD)
- UN Conference on Trade and Development (UNCTAD)
- World Bank (WB)
- UN Conference on Trade and Development (UNTAD)
- UNESCO Institute for Statistics (UNESCO-UIS)
- International Telecommunication Union (ITU)
- United Nations Environmental Programme-Climate Technology Centre and Network (UNEP-CTCN)
- World Trade Organization (WTO)
- International Trade Centre (ITC)
- United Nations Conference on Trade and Development (UNCTAD)
- United Nations Environmental Programme (UNEP)
- United Nations Development Programme (UNDP)
- Department of Economic and Social Affairs-Statistics Division (DESA-UNSD)
- PARIS 21
- SDG Local Business Growth
