= Policy coherence for development =

Approach in development assistance

Policy coherence for development (PCD) is an approach and policy tool for integrating the economic, social, environmental and governance dimensions of sustainable development at all stages of domestic and international policy making. It is the aim of PCD to make foreign relations to be as ecologically, economically and socially coherent as possible and thereby to make international co-operation for international development more effective.

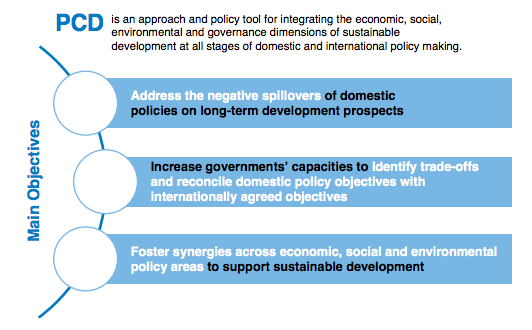
Policy Coherence for Development Flow Chart

Commitments on achieving greater policy coherence to promote development have also been promoted by the Organisation for Economic Co-operation and Development (OECD) (which has a specific department, Policy Coherence for Development Unit) as well as in the 2011 Busan Partnership for Effective Development Cooperation, the UN Millennium Declaration and the 2010 UN Millennium Development Goals Summit. In an era when development assistance is likely to come under more pressure, Policy Coherence for Development (PCD) should become more important. An example of such recognition is the target of the United Nations Sustainable Development Goal 17 which aims to enhance policy coherence for sustainable development as part of the 2030 Agenda.

PCD operates in a multi-polar global economy in which all countries are playing a role in driving global growth and enabling sustainable development. A rapidly changing global economic landscape means every country is facing more complex and interlinked economic, social and environmental challenges. A better understanding of the linkages of the emerging global trends and their implications is critical for countries as they craft strategies for sustainable development.

== Principles ==
Policy coherence for development (PCD) is the integration of economic, social and environmental dimensions of sustainable development. It aims to improve coherence between domestic policies on the one side, and foreign, international cooperation or development policies on the other side. Related terms which describe similar concepts are policy coordination, environmental policy integration and environmental mainstreaming.

Under the principles of PCD, potential conflicts of objectives and interests between international co-operation and other sectoral policies of the various federal departments should be identified and resolved as far as possible. These may be in the following policy areas: Migration, agriculture, environment, health, financial sector, security, education, research and cultural policy.

The aim is to ensure harmony across key stages of the policy cycle, including setting objectives, selecting policy tools, implementing measures, and monitoring outcomes. For example, effective policy coherence prioritises policy objectives of all the different sectors in order to prevent unintended negative impacts on a particular sector or conflicts with international commitments of a country.

A key assumption underlying the concept of policy coherence for development is that ineffective, inequitable and unsustainable development interventions are, in part, the consequence of fragmented and incoherent institutional and policy design.

This suggests another assumption: that changing institutional rules, procedures, and structures can create 'win-win' opportunities to serve a common goal—a theme that dominates discussions about coherence. However, scholars have pointed out that the design logic informing the pursuit of policy coherence neglects that substantively, policy coherence is shaped by choices and preferences over what gets prioritised.

== History ==
The origins of the concept go back to successful European NGO campaigns of the 1990s that put a spotlight on 'dumping' of European products in developing countries, and which in 1992 led to an article in the Treaty on European Community that required EU policy makers to take account of developing country interests when drawing up new policies. Depending on the translation, this Treaty article was referred to as promoting coherence (e.g. German version) or consistency (e.g. English version). Later that same decade the OECD added 'for development' so as to clarify that 'PCD' was about ensuring that policies do not harm and where possible contribute to international development objectives. Examples of PCD definitions clarifying this impact focus can be found in the 2005 European Consensus on Development and the 2008 outcome document of the UN MDG summit, both of which link to the MDGs.

The concept of policy coherence for development (PCD) first emerged in discussions among international aid donors in the early 1990s. The term Policy Coherence for Development (PCD) originally emerged from the realisation that non-aid policies of donors affect developing countries and should not distract but rather be supportive of international development goals. The PCD concept initially emphasised the responsibility of developed countries to take into account the effect on developing countries when formulating domestic policies across different sectors (trade, finance, migration, security, technology, science). It thus originates from a north-south paradigm with responsibilities for better PCD placed on developed countries to the benefit of developing countries. As the concept evolved, PCD has been understood to go beyond a 'do no harm' approach, also with a requirement to seek synergies between development co-operation and other policies as well as to correct existing incoherencies. The debates taking place in the EU and the OECD on promoting PCD have also fostered the understanding that PCD should be enhanced at different levels. These were commonly referred to as internal, intra-governmental, inter-governmental, multilateral, multi stakeholder and developing country coherence.

The Organisation for Economic Co-operation and Development (OECD) has been promoting the term and concept of PCD at least since 2018, saying that it would help achieve sustainable and resilient societies.

Over the decades, the commitment to policy coherence has received wide-ranging political endorsements. In global goal-setting, the policy coherence focus has broadened from a focus on development cooperation framed around poverty alleviation to universal sustainable development. Amongst most OECD donors, the more commonly used term is now policy coherence for sustainable development rather than just policy coherence for development.

== Applications by donor ==
=== European Union ===
The European Union has translated this idea into a legal commitment as most recently stated in the Treaty of Lisbon in 2009 and has highlighted the concept in political declarations and communications. The OECD expressed political will to ensure PCD as noted its 2008 Ministerial Declaration and in the following 2010 Council Recommendations on PCD. The OECD Strategy for Development also assigns key importance to PCD. Both OECD and EU have put in place systems and tools define overall ambition and targets, facilitate decision-making and monitor progress, which include institutional mechanisms, monitoring tools, e.g. peer reviews, indicators and reporting, as well as policy tool-kits presented as practical measures to achieve progress. Some OECD Member states, for example Finland, the Netherlands, have currently developed and piloted self-assessment PCD toolkits. Finland and Switzerland are also testing developing country-level impact assessments in the area of food security.

The European Centre for Development Policy Management (ECDPM) a think tank focused on development co-operation that is based in Maastricht, The Netherlands, argue that Policy Coherence for Development (PCD) is fundamentally a matter of politics. A key dilemma for the countries is how to develop and sustain a level of political interest in and support for PCD, how to put PCD on the political agenda, and to retain momentum and make commitments towards promoting PCD meaningful at both the national and EU level. Although the potential benefits of effective PCD remain unquestioned, ECDPM argues that political leadership, sponsorship and focus have waned in recent years in the several countries, even if many of these are considered global leaders in PCD.

A recent report from the European Commission states that the European Union has made good progress on Policy Coherence for Development (PCD) at both European and Member State level, a fact recognised by the OECD in the most recent (2012) OECD DAC peer review. It argues that the EU has cemented its position as a global leader in implementing PCD commitments in policy-making. It does however acknowledge that there is still room for progress in terms of using mechanisms such as impact assessments, evaluation and/or measuring, monitoring progress and reporting on implementation. The Commission argues that the EU remains the lead actor for PCD internationally, ahead of its main partners, with the highest levels of political and legal commitment. More recently, PCD issues have benefited from sustained high-level political attention in the EU and featured more prominently on the agenda of the EU Foreign Affairs Council.

==== The Netherlands ====
Scholars have stated that the Netherlands has been "highly influential in the development of PCD, and is one of the frontrunners in applying PCD at the national level". The country uses PCD in its whole-of-government approach, with different ministries and departments jointly implementing PCD activities. The government of the Netherlands believes in the mutually beneficial relationship between trade and development cooperation, and this lies at the core of its PCD approach.

The Dutch PCD approach aims to integrate sustainability with the other objectives of sustainable development, for example in the area of climate action: “Climate action is integrated into development activities, in particular in the areas of energy, water and food security. In this way it is achieved that climate action and development action do not undermine each other but reinforce each other”.

=== United States ===
Policy coherence for development is among the many criteria for the OECD Development Assistance Committee Peer Review Process. The 2011 DAC Peer Review of the United States stated that "The OECD/DAC describes progress towards policy coherence for development (PCD) as involving three building blocks: (i) a political commitment that clearly specifies policy objectives; (ii) policy co-ordination mechanisms that can resolve conflicts or inconsistencies between policies and maximise synergies; and (iii) monitoring, analysis and reporting systems to provide the evidence base for accountability and for well- informed policy making and politics (OECD, 2008a). The 2006 peer review encouraged the US government to develop a more explicit policy on the role of policy coherence for development and to put in place the resources needed to carry out analysis and effectively manage the policy coherence agenda. Five years on, the US has achieved mixed progress in implementing these recommendations and the three PCD pillars"

The OECD argue that national security strategy cannot substitute for a policy coherence for development agenda. After the passing of the FY14 State and Foreign Operations Appropriations bill in 2013, Kate Almquist Knopf, a former assistant administrator for USAID, blogged that "There is a fundamental mismatch between the United States’ foreign aid architecture, resources, and objectives" and that the bill was a "stinging reminder of the low esteem in which many members of Congress hold global development and the US Agency for International Development (USAID), the primary federal agency charged with delivering US foreign assistance worldwide." She called for the USAID administrator to be a standing member of the National Security Council, and the US Secretary of State could return actual budget and planning authority to USAID by restoring the USAID administrator as the dual-hatted director of US foreign assistance.

== Applications by sector ==
=== Food security ===
Food security is a major development challenge and to address this, the EU amongst others has effectively put global food security high among its development priorities for the years to come. However, while the European Union is the world's major development actor on food security, as ECDPM argues some of its other policies are still contested as harmful to global food security and agricultural development.

An analysis of EU policy-making processes related to agriculture, fisheries, energy and trade shows that some tangible efforts have been made to strengthen policy coherence 'for food security'. However, these are tentative steps. Other concerns and interests dominate the debates and shape the outcomes, while global food security considerations play a very marginal to no role, or the food security rationale used is at odds with the logic of the EU's own food security policy framework.

=== Sustainable Development Goals (2015–2030) ===
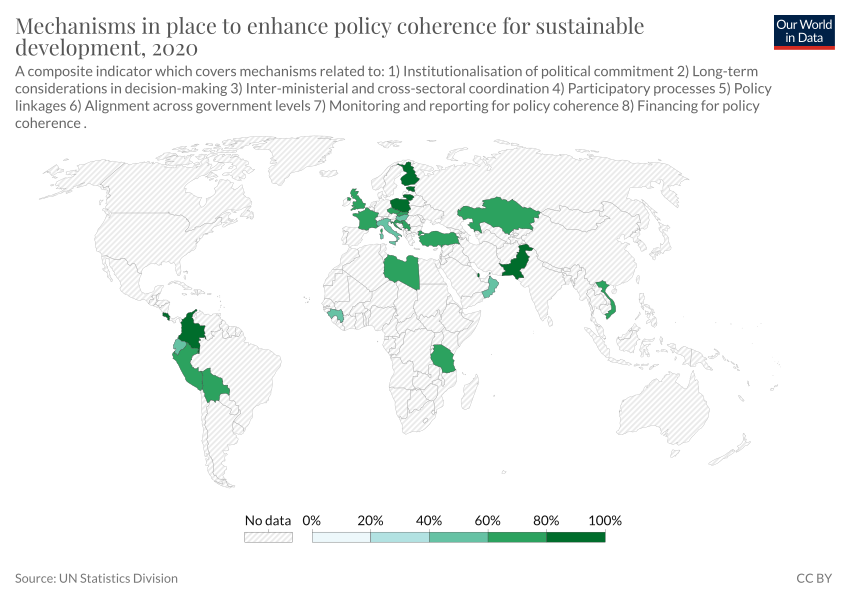
Mechanisms in place to enhance policy coherence for sustainable (as of 2022)

The United Nations Sustainable Development Goal 17 aims to enhance policy coherence for sustainable development as part of the 2030 Agenda. Its Target 17.14 is formulated as: "Enhance policy coherence for sustainable development." This target has one Indicator: Indicator 17.14.1 is the "Number of countries with mechanisms in place to enhance policy coherence of sustainable development".

Amid international reflection on the form and content of a post-2015 framework, among many other issues, PCD was highlighted as being a key component of the 'beyond-aid' debate. The post-2015 agenda discussions emphasised the need for a universal development agenda that is relevant to the needs of all countries and which is based on shared responsibilities. This is against the background of a changing global development landscape and shared development and 'global public goods' challenges, such as climate change, widening income inequalities, resource scarcity and environmental degradation. The original PCD concept focusing on 'beyond-aid' policies of OECD DAC donor countries does not easily fit such a new 'universal' logic. For this reason, the OECD has reconceptualised PCD and now promotes a wider universal approach and definition of PCD in the context of the post-2015 agenda.

A paper by ECDPM argues that the various of the ideas and principles of PCD can be mainstreamed in the post-2015 framework without using strong PCD jargon. These include i) targets for Means of Implementation in thematic areas that effectively require strengthened PCD efforts, ii) targets in relation to capacity building for more integrated and evidence-based policy-making and iii) efforts to build a strong accountability framework. The paper further concludes that independent from whether a universal PCD concept will explicitly be part of the language of a new framework, real progress on PCD will have to remain a major, if not the most, important component of OECD and EU MS action in achievement of post-2015 commitments.

== Measurements ==
The Policy Coherence for Sustainable Development Index (PCSDI) is an index elaborated by the Non Governmental Organisation Coordinator in cooperation with the Spanish Network for Development Studies REEDES. PCSDI analyses both the policies that make a positive contribution to sustainable development in a country and those that impact negatively, not only on that country, but also on third countries or on the whole planet.

In 2019 PCSDI 148 countries are ranked from 26.76 (the worst, India) to 79.02 (the best, Denmark). The PCSDI has 5 components: economic, social, environmental, global and productive.

== Critique ==
In 2013, the high-profile development blogger Owen Barder wrote a critique of the concept of 'Policy Coherence for Development' entitled 'Policy Coherence Is a Hobgoblin'. He argued that "The term PCD has given us an industry of reports and conferences focussing on whether countries have policies which are consistent with each other, and institutions thought likely to make them so, instead of focusing on whether and how those policies are individually supportive of, or inimical to, development." He argued that the PCD concept has "perhaps subconsciously, altered the country’s policy objectives away from impact to consistency."

== See also ==
- Development Policy Review
