= Hans Zomer =

- Born: Leiden, Netherlands
- Occupation: Director of Dóchas

Hans Zomer (born 1968) is CEO of Global Action Plan Ireland, an environmental organisation focused on behaviour change. Before that, he was the spokesperson for President of Ireland Michael D. Higgins.

Previously he served as Director of Dóchas, the Irish national platform of Development NGOs.

Hans became the first Director of Dóchas in 2002, and has chaired the network's major public campaigns, including the Make Poverty History Irish Campaign, and the "Act Now on 2015" campaign.

Prior to his appointment, he worked for Concern Worldwide, one of the largest Irish NGOs, and as a Development Consultant in Pakistan and as Coordinator for EIRENE-Tchad, an organisation running human rights and rural development programmes in Chad.

He has wide-ranging experience in NGO networking and advocacy work, having worked for several Brussels-based NGO networks, such as the EU-NGO Liaison Committee (CONCORD’s predecessor) and APRODEV. He is a political scientist by training, having studied in Amsterdam and Copenhagen, and speaks 5 European languages. He is married with three children.
