= Dóchas =

Irish network of humanitarian NGOs

- Formation: October 1993; 32 years ago
- Merger of: CONGOOD; Irish National Assembly
- Type: NGO Network
- Purpose: Umberella network for Irish NGOs focused on development, relief work and development education.
- Region served: Republic of Ireland
- CEO: Jane-Ann McKenna
- Chairperson: Rosamond Bennett
- Vice Chairperson: John Moffett
- Affiliations: CONCORD
- Website: www.dochas.ie

Dóchas (English: "hope") is the network of non-governmental organisations (NGOs) involved in development and relief overseas and development education in Ireland. Formed in October 1993 through a merger of the Confederation of Non-Governmental Development Organisations (CONGOOD) and the Irish National Assembly, Dóchas is an umbrella group for a diverse range of NGOs involved with the aim of bringing them together to operate more effectively as a single cohesive entity. Dóchas is the Irish member of CONCORD.

== People ==
- Helen Keogh, former Chairperson
- Hans Zomer, former Director
