= Capacity building =

Process within NGOs and non-profits

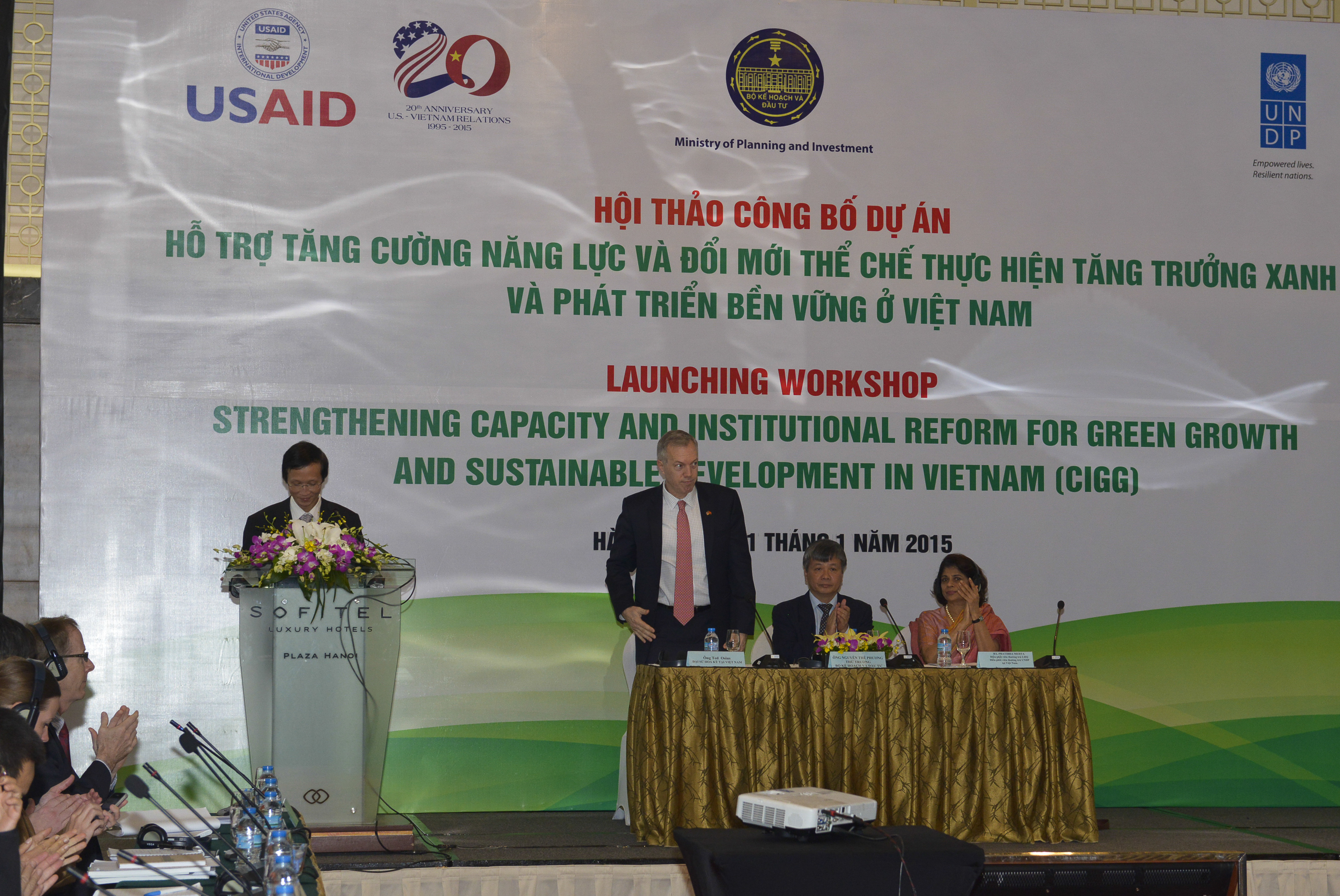
Launching of the "Strengthening Capacity and Institutional Reform for Green Growth and Sustainable Development in Vietnam" Project in 2015

Capacity building (or capacity development, capacity strengthening) is the improvement in an individual's or organization's facility (or capability) "to produce, perform or deploy". The terms capacity building and capacity development have often been used interchangeably, although a publication by OECD-DAC stated in 2006 that capacity development was the preferable term. Since the 1950s, international organizations, governments, non-governmental organizations (NGOs) and communities use the concept of capacity building as part of "social and economic development" in national and subnational plans. The United Nations Development Programme defines itself by "capacity development" in the sense of "'how UNDP works" to fulfill its mission. The UN system applies it in almost every sector, including several of the Sustainable Development Goals to be achieved by 2030. For example, the Sustainable Development Goal 17 advocates for enhanced international support for capacity building in developing countries to support national plans to implement the 2030 Agenda.

Under the codification of international development law, capacity building is a "cross cutting modality of international intervention". It often overlaps or is part of interventions in public administration reform, good governance and education in line sectors of public services.

The consensus approach of the international community for the components of capacity building as established by the World Bank, United Nations and European Commission consists of five areas: a clear policy framework, institutional development and legal framework, citizen participation and oversight, human resources improvements including education and training, and sustainability. Some of these overlap with other interventions and sectors. Much of the actual focus has been on training and educational inputs where it may be a euphemism for education and training. For example, UNDP focuses on training needs in its assessment methodology rather than on actual performance goals.

The pervasive use of the term for these multiple sectors and elements and the huge amount of development aid funding devoted to it has resulted in controversy over its true meaning. There is also concern over its use and impacts. In international development funding, evaluations by the World Bank and other donors have consistently revealed problems in this overall category of funding dating back to the year 2000. Since the arrival of capacity building as a dominant subject in international aid, donors and practitioners have struggled to create a concise mechanism for determining the effectiveness of capacity building initiatives. An independent public measurement indicator for improvement and oversight of the large variety of capacity building initiatives was published in 2015. This scoring system is based on international development law and professional management principles.

== Definitions ==
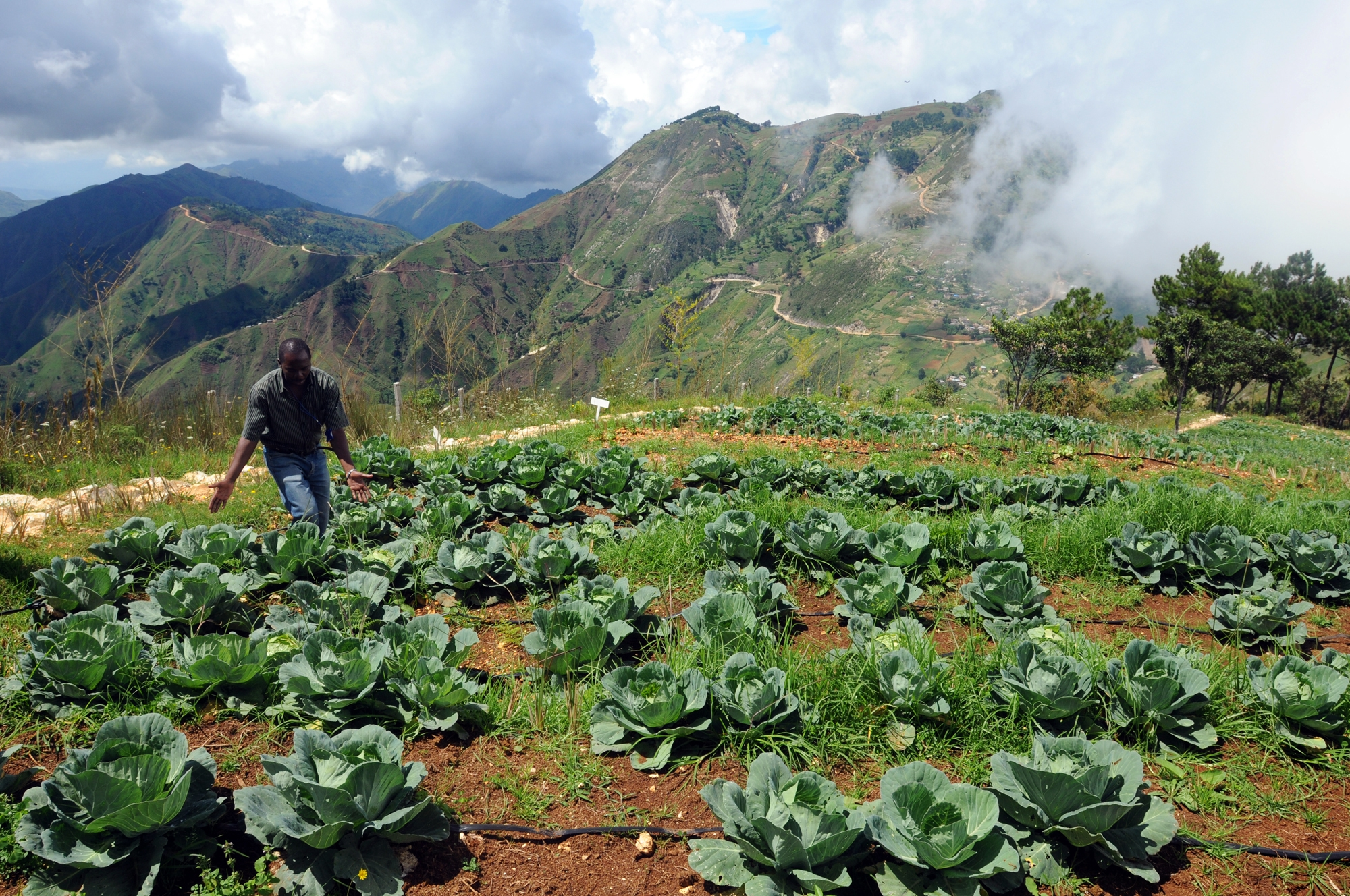
Training at Wynne Farm, a training facility for farmers in Kenscoff, Haiti as part of Watershed Initiative for National Natural Environmental Resources program, a five-year, $126 million dollar project to build Haiti's agricultural infrastructure, capacity, and productivity in a sustainable way (2010)

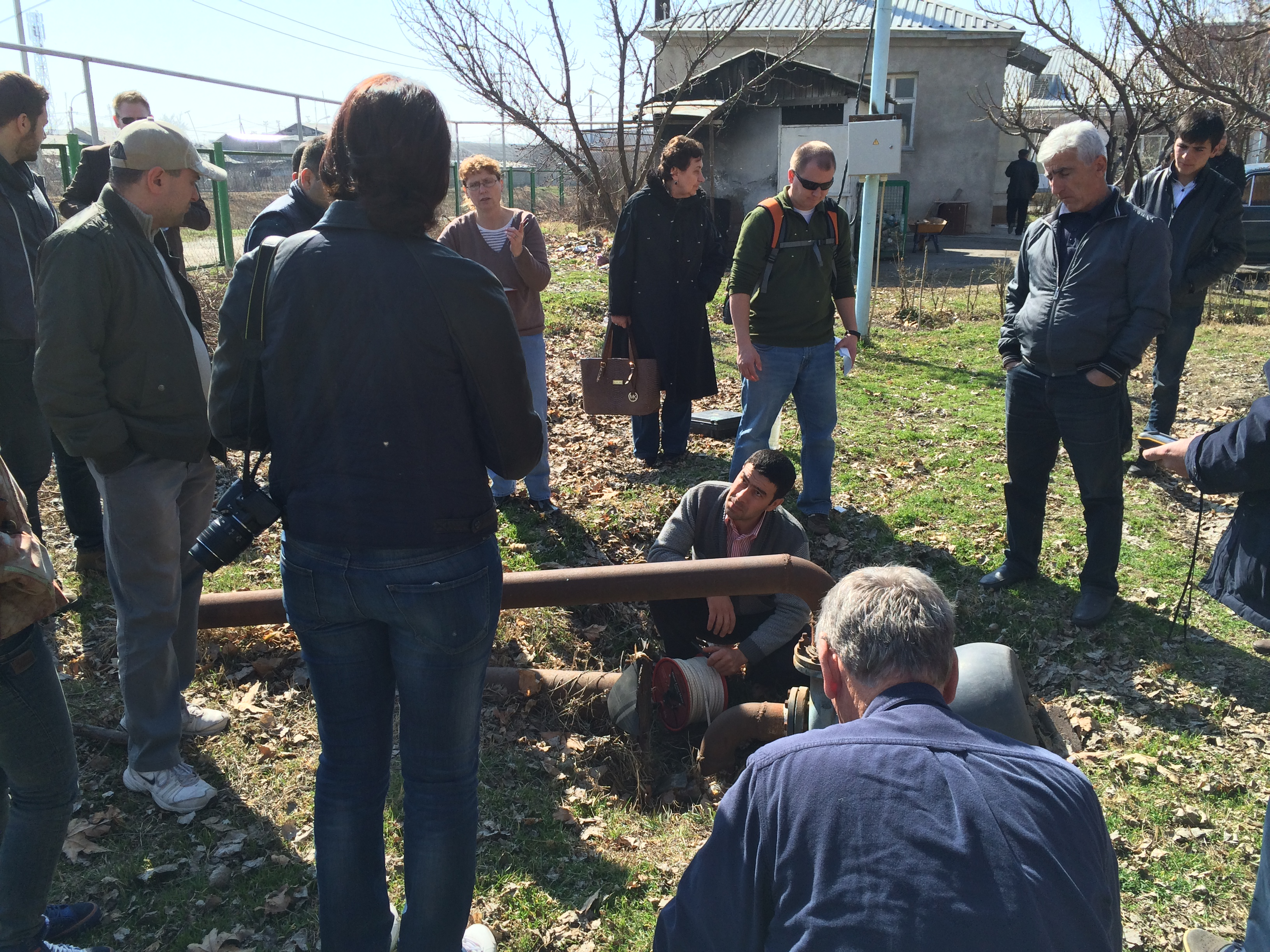
Field training by the U.S. Geological Survey (USGS) team within the scope of "Building Groundwater Management Capacity for Armenia's Ararat Valley" project funded by the USAID (2016)

=== Capacity development ===
A "good practice paper" by OECD-DAC defined capacity development as follows: "Capacity development is understood as the process whereby people, organizations and society as a whole unleash, strengthen, create, adapt and maintain capacity over time." Capacity is understood as "the ability of people, organizations and society as a whole to manage their affairs successfully".

The OECD-DAC stated in 2006 that the term "capacity development" should be used rather than the term "capacity building". This is because "capacity building" would imply starting from a plain surface and a step-by-step erection of a new structure - which is not how it works.

The European Commission Toolkit defines capacity development in the same way and stresses that capacity relates to "abilities", "attributes" and a "process". It is an attribute of people, individual organizations and groups of organizations. Capacity is shaped by, adapting to and reacting to external factors and actors, but it is not something external — it is internal to people, organizations and groups or systems of organizations. Thus, capacity development is a change process internal to organizations and people.

The United Nations Office for Disaster Risk Reduction (UNDRR), formerly the United Nations International Strategy for Disaster Reduction (UNISDR), defines capacity development in the disaster risk reduction domain as "the process by which people, organizations and society systematically stimulate and develop their capability over time to achieve social and economic goals, including through improvement of knowledge, skills, systems, and institutions – within a wider social and cultural enabling environment."

Outside of international interventions, capacity building can refer to strengthening the skills of people and communities, in small businesses and local grassroots movements. Organizational capacity building is used by NGOs and governments to guide their internal development and activities as a form of managerial improvements following administrative practices.

=== Community capacity building ===
The United Nations Committee of Experts on Public Administration in 2006 offered an additional term, "community capacity building". It is defined as a long-term continual process of development that involves all stakeholders as opposed to practices which limit oversight and involvement in interventions with governments. The list of parties that it defines as "community" includes ministries, local authorities, non-governmental organizations, professionals, community members, academics and more. According to the Committee, capacity building takes place at an individual, an institutional, societal level and "non-training" level.

The term "community capacity building" (CCB) began to be used in 1995 and since then became popular for example within the policy literature in the United Kingdom, particularly in the context of urban policy, regeneration and social development. It is, however, difficult to distinguish it from the practice of "community development". It is "built on a deficit model of communities which fails to engage properly with their own skills, knowledge and interests". Therefore, it does not properly address structural reasons for poverty and inequality.

== Components ==
The World Bank, United Nations and European Commission describe capacity building to consist of five areas: a clear policy framework, institutional development and legal framework, citizen/democratic participation and oversight, human resources improvements including education and training, and sustainability.

The United Nations Development Group Capacity Development Guidelines presents a framework of capacity development comprising three interconnected levels of capacity: Individual, Institutional and Enabling Policy.

Thinking of capacity building as simply training or human resource development is insufficient.

== Evolution ==
=== History ===
The discourse on and concept of capacity development has traditionally been closely associated with development cooperation.

The UNDP was one of the forerunners in designing international interventions in the category of capacity building and development. In the early 1970s, the UNDP offered guidance to its staff and governments on what it called "institution-building" which is one of the pillars of its current work and is part of a category of "public administration reform".

In the 1970s, international organizations emphasized building capacity through technical skills training in rural areas, and also in the administrative sectors of developing countries. In the 1980s they expanded the concept of institutional development further. "Institutional development" was viewed as a long-term process of interventions in a developing country's government, public and private sector institutions, and NGOs.

Under the UNDP's 2008–2013 "strategic plan for development", capacity building is the "organization's core contribution to development". The UNDP focused on building capacity at an institutional level and offers a six-step process for systematic capacity building. The six steps are: Conducting training need assessment, engage stakeholders on capacity development, assess capacity needs and assets, formulate a capacity development response, implement a capacity development response, evaluate capacity development.

=== Trends ===
Since about 2005, the capacity development agenda has also been adopted beyond the traditional aid community. This is particularly true for Africa: for example the African Union has developed a Capacity Development Strategic Framework and is using capacity development as one of three themes to structure its Development Effectiveness internet portal.

Trends in development cooperation shape how capacity development is discussed. These include for example: new forms of financing and less of a North–South dichotomy; more in-country leadership and less donor power; resilience as a framework in fragile environments; increasing private sector engagement.

=== Global goals ===
The UNDP integrated this capacity-building system into its work on reaching the Millennium Development Goals (MDGs) by the year 2015. The UNDP states that it focused on building capacity at the institutional level because it believed that "institutions are at the heart of human development, and that when they are able to perform better, [...] they can contribute more meaningfully to the achievement of national human development goals."

The United Nations Sustainable Development Goals mention capacity building (rather than capacity development) in several places: Sustainable Development Goal 17 is to "Strengthen the means of implementation and revitalize the Global Partnership for Sustainable Development". Target 9 of that goal is formulated as "Enhance international support for implementing effective and targeted capacity-building in developing countries to support national plans to implement all the Sustainable Development Goals, including through north–south, South-South and triangular cooperation."

Sustainable Development Goal 6 also includes capacity building in its Target 6a which is to "By 2030, expand international cooperation and capacity-building support to developing countries in water- and sanitation-related activities and programmes, including water harvesting, desalination, water efficiency, wastewater treatment, recycling and reuse technologies". Similarly, Sustainable Development Goal 8 Target 8.10 states "Strengthen the capacity of domestic financial institutions to encourage and expand access to banking, insurance and financial services for all".

== Scale ==
As of 2009, some $20 billion per year of international development intervention funding went for capacity development; roughly 20% of total funding in this category The World Bank committed more than $1 billion per year to this service in loans or grants (more than 10% of its portfolio of nearly $10 billion).

A publication by OECD-DAC in 2005 estimated that "about a quarter of donor aid, or more than $15 billion a year, has gone into "Technical Cooperation", the bulk of which is ostensibly aimed at capacity development".

== Processes for different entities ==
=== Governments ===
One of the most fundamental ideas associated with capacity building is the idea of building the capacities of governments in developing countries so they are able to handle the problems associated with environmental protection, economic and social needs. Developing a government's capacity whether at the local, regional or national level can improve governance and can lead to sustainable development and political reform. Capacity building in governments often targets a government's ability to budget, collect revenue, create and implement laws, promote civic engagement.

=== Local communities and NGOs ===
International donors often include capacity building as a form of interventions with local governments or NGOs working in developing areas. A study in 2001 observed that "the act of resetting aspirations and strategy is often the first step in improving an organization's capacity". Secondly good management is important (committed people in senior positions to make capacity building happen). Thirdly, patience is required: "there are few quick fixes when it comes to building capacity".

Some methods of capacity building for NGOs might include visiting training centers, organizing exposure visits, office and documentation support, on-the-job training, learning centers, and consultations.

=== Private sector organizations ===
For private sector organizations, capacity building may go beyond the improvement of services for public organizations and include fund-raising and income generation, diversity, partnerships and collaboration, marketing, positioning, planning and other activities relating to production and performance.^{:35–36} Capacity development of private organizations involves the build-up of an organization's tangible and intangible assets. Organization development (OD) is the study and implementation of practices, systems, and techniques that affect organizational change. The goal of which is to modify an organization's performance and/or culture.

== Evaluation ==
=== Challenges with evaluations ===
The difficulties with achieving results from capacity development projects have regularly been described in a range of publications. For example, in 2006, a document by OECD-DAC stated that: "evaluation results confirm that development of sustainable capacity remains one of the most difficult areas of international development practice. Capacity development has been one of the least responsive targets of donor assistance, lagging behind progress in infrastructure development or improving health and child mortality".

Since the arrival of capacity building as a dominant subject in international aid, donors and practitioners have struggled to create a concise mechanism for determining the effectiveness of capacity building initiatives.

Recognition of problems in capacity building interventions in evaluations funded and managed by international organizations dates back to the year 1999. A World Bank review in the year 2000 found many examples where capacity building interventions undermined public management efforts. In these cases, public sector reform and institution-building were hindered. In 2005, the Bank noted again in its evaluations that business practices to its capacity building work are not as rigorous as they are in other areas. For example, standard quality assurance processes were missing at the design stage. Similar problems were reported by UNDP in 2002 when they reviewed their capacity building projects.

=== Effective evaluation and monitoring ===
In 2007, specific criteria for effective evaluation and monitoring of the capacity building of NGOs were proposed, though only in generalities without clear measures for the tool. The proposal suggested only that evaluating the capacity building ability of NGOs should be based on a combination of monitoring the results of their activities and also a more open flexible way of monitoring that also takes into consideration, self-improvement and cooperation. Other wishes were that monitoring for capacity building effectiveness should include an organization's clarity of mission, an organization's leadership, an organization's learning, an organization's emphasis on on-the-job-development, an organization's monitoring processes.

In 2007, USAID published a report on its approach to monitoring and evaluating the capacity building. According to the report, USAID monitors program objectives, the links between projects and activities of an organization and its objectives, a program or organization's measurable indicators, data collection, and progress reports. USAID noted two types of indicators for progress: "output indicators" and "outcome indicators." Output indicators measure immediate changes or results such as the number of people trained. Outcome indicators measure the impact, such as laws changed due to trained advocates. Both the "numbers of people trained" and "laws changed" are, however, just inputs or intermediate inputs and do not measure actual improvements in "performance" in terms of measurable outcomes of public agencies that are the definition of capacity building.

Despite these claims of existence of these evaluation approaches, there was little more than lists of inputs and outputs without use of professional management standards or any kind of real oversight, and a report for the World Bank in 2009 noted that the failures were deep and systemic, where the measures used are "smile sheets", asking beneficiaries if they are "happy" or "better off" and measuring things like "raised awareness", "enhanced skills", and "improved teamwork" that are "locally driven", rather than on whether the underlying problems are solved, and refraining from asking whether there may be hidden agendas to buy influence, subsidize elites, and continue dependency.

An independent public measurement indicator for improvement and oversight of the large variety of capacity building initiatives was published in 2015, with scoring, and based on international development law and professional management principles. This comprehensive indicator for capacity building was proposed as part of the elements codifying international development law in a treatise. It consists of 20 specific elements that apply law, administrative principles, social science concepts, and education concepts, to troubleshoot the actual problems that occur and to promote public oversight and accountability. The indicator has two sections: one with 11 questions to assure proper application of the five recognized principles of capacity building, analyzing their application in diagnosis and design of an intervention (7 questions), sustainability of reform (2 questions), and good governance (2 questions), and second, with 9 questions to assure professionalism and safeguards against conflicts of interest, unintended consequences, and distortion of public and private systems. This indicator is one of 13 that is part of the treatise of international development law and can be applied with the other indicators for specific sectors and development principles, as well as assurance of quality of evaluation systems.

== Critique ==
Critique of capacity development has centered on the ambiguity surrounding it in terms of its anticipated focus, its effectiveness, the role of infrastructure organisations (such as empowerment networks), and the unwillingness or inability of public agencies to apply their own principles and international law.

Capacity building has been called a buzzword within development which comes with a heavy normative load but little critical interrogation and appropriate review. The term capacity building is usually "loaded with positive value".

Despite some 20 years recognizing the problems, practitioners continue to note that some capacity development projects are just "throwing money at symptoms with no logic or analysis". Others are "disguised bribes to government officials and attempts to undermine entire government structures by setting up foreign run Ministries and foreign influenced political parties or civil society to lobby for foreign interests" using the interventions as a form of "soft power". One common problem of interventions that focus on education and training of foreign government officials is that they are akin to trying to "teach elephants to fly" or to "teach wolves not to eat sheep" while avoiding the actual changes needed for impact.

Under international development law, there is also concern that much of the implementation of capacity building has been and continues to be in violation of existing international treaties such as the U.N. Declaration Against Corruption and Bribery, Articles 15, 16, 18, and 19.

== Examples ==
Below are examples of capacity building in developing countries:

- At state government level: In 1999, the UNDP supported capacity building of the state government in Bosnia and Herzegovina. The program focused on strengthening the state's government by fostering new organizational, leadership and management skills in government figures, improved the government's technical abilities to communicate with the international community and civil society within the country.
- In India the Sanitation Capacity Building platform (SCBP) was designed to "support and build the capacity of town/cities to plan and implement decentralized sanitation solutions" with funding by the Bill & Melinda Gates Foundation from 2015 to 2022.
