= Open Forum for CSO Development Effectiveness =

The Open Forum for CSO Development Effectiveness was the medium for a process led by civil society organizations (CSOs) between 2008 and 2012, to agree common principles and guidelines on CSO development effectiveness and bring the collective vision of organized people's groups into international development policy and practice.

== Origins ==
The Open Forum was established as a temporary part of the "effectiveness movement" on international aid and development cooperation that started in the early 2000s. At first, discussions on aid effectiveness had mostly been led by aid donors and partner governments. But the Paris Declaration on Aid Effectiveness (2005), which was agreed at the second of four High Level Forums on Aid Effectiveness, recognised that CSOs played a significant role in aid effectiveness; CSOs were represented at its signing ceremony. CSOs were then mobilised to play a greater part at the 3rd High Level Forum on Aid Effectiveness to be held at Accra in 2008. This mobilisation partly arose from consultative meetings of an Advisory Group on Civil Society and Aid Effectiveness (AG-CS) that had been formed by the OECD's Development Assistance Committee. Open Forum was born at a three-day meeting of over 70 CSOs in Paris in June 2008. Its purpose was to take forward a global process towards agreeing a CSO-suitable effectiveness framework, and arriving at a common CSO negotiating position in time for the fourth High Level Conference in 2011. It received funding from the Swedish International Development Cooperation Agency (SIDA) through CONCORD, a European NGO confederation.

== Worldwide consultations ==
To achieve its objective, Open Forum facilitated numerous national, regional, global and thematic consultations with CSOs around the world regarding standards to guide their work.

== Istanbul Principles ==
The eight Istanbul Principles for CSO Development Effectiveness are part of the International Framework for CSO Development Effectiveness. They came out of the Open Forum consultations as the guiding values for the development work of CSOs. The Istanbul Principles were endorsed at the Global Assembly of the Open Forum Istanbul, Turkey (September 2010) and include:

1. Respect and promote human rights and social justice;
2. Embody gender equality and equity while promoting women and girls' rights;
3. Focus on people's empowerment, democratic ownership and participation;
4. Promote environmental sustainability;
5. Practice transparency and accountability;
6. Pursue equitable partnerships and solidarity;
7. Create and share knowledge and commit to mutual learning;
8. Commit to realizing positive sustainable change

== The International Framework for CSO Development Effectiveness ==
The ultimate agreement coming out of the Open Forum consultations was titled (the Siem Reap CSO Consensus on) the International Framework for CSO Development Effectiveness. It is a collective statement by CSOs from different countries and regions on the common standards guiding their development work. The International Framework is notable in that it consolidates inputs of a multitude of civil society actors from across the world in one statement. It was finalized at the Open Forum Global Assembly in Siem Reap, Cambodia (June 2011).

The International Framework has three main substantive sections. The first (Section II) is a statement and explanation of the Istanbul Principles. The second (Section III) details how CSOs should seek to become accountable. The third (Section IV) is on the enabling conditions that CSOs need in order to be effective in development cooperation.

== Impact on 2011 Busan outcome document ==
The work of the Open Partnership bore fruit at the 4th High-Level Forum on Aid Effectiveness (Busan, Republic of Korea, 2011). This was the first time that civil society officially took part in negotiations on aid effectiveness on an equal basis with partner governments and donors. The outcome agreement of HLF4 – the Busan Partnership for Effective Development Co-operation – included an article (number 22) on CSOs. In this article, the signatories recognised the role of CSOs and the standards set out in the Istanbul Principles and the International Framework, and they vowed to "implement fully our respective commitments to enable CSOs to exercise their roles as independent development actors". However, some saw the reference to "our respective commitments" as falling short of the guarantee requested by CSOs.

In conjunction with HLF4, the Istanbul Principles received recognition from individual development stakeholders including the United States and the European Union.

== Last stages ==
In 2012 the Open Forum produced its final outputs: toolkits for advocacy and implementation of the International Framework, image icons for the Istanbul Principles, a practitioner guide, a wiki platform, and a storytelling (documentation) site. The Open Forum project was wound up. Continuing consultations with CSOs, and its sister organisation, BetterAid, resulted in the formation of a new entity to carry forward the global affairs of CSOs: the CSO Partnership for Development Effectiveness
