= Annie Laws =

American educator

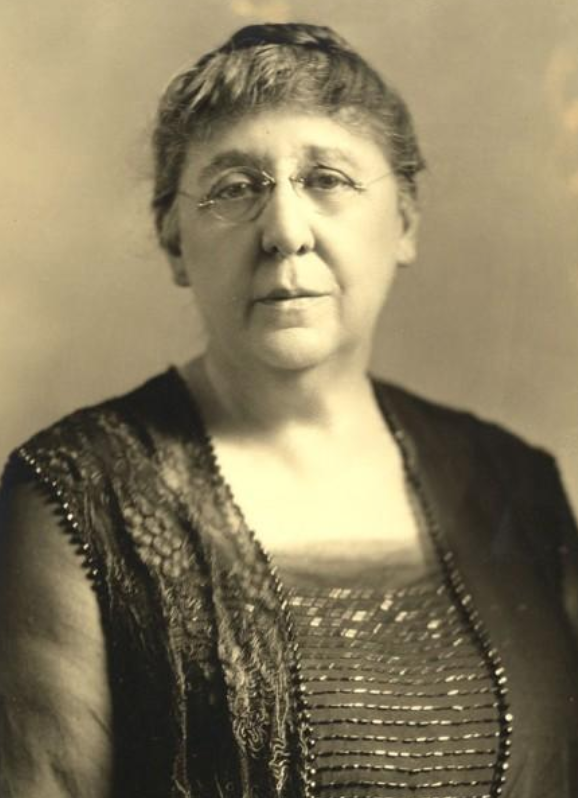
- Annie Laws, from a 1927 publication
- Born: Anna Laws; January 20, 1855; Cincinnati, Ohio, U.S.
- Died: July 1, 1927 (age 72); Cincinnati, Ohio, U.S.
- Occupation(s): Educator, clubwoman, philanthropist

Anna "Annie" Laws (January 20, 1855 – July 1, 1927) was an American educator, clubwoman, and philanthropist based in Cincinnati, Ohio. She was president of the International Kindergarten Union from 1903 to 1905.

== Early life and education ==
Anna Laws was born in Cincinnati, the daughter of James Hedding Laws and Sarah Amelia Langdon Laws. She attended Miss Appleton's School. In 1924, she received an honorary master's degree in education from the University of Cincinnati, in recognition of her career in the field.

== Career ==
=== Education ===
Laws co-founded the Cincinnati Kindergarten Association in 1879; she was president of the association from 1901 to 1927. "No one in Cincinnati thinks about kindergartens without thinking of Miss Annie Laws," explained a local history in 1927. She was president of the International Kindergarten Union from 1903 to 1905, and chaired the Union's "Committee of Nineteen", working with other kindergarten movement leaders including Lucy Wheelock, Susan Blow, Patty Hill, and Elizabeth Harrison. From 1912 to 1916, Laws served on the Cincinnati Board of Education, as its first woman member.

Laws hosted meetings of the Cincinnati Visiting Nurse Association in her home. In 1888 she helped to establish the Cincinnati Training School for Nurses, and was president of the school. She founded the School for Household Arts in Cincinnati in 1910.

=== Clubwork ===
From 1892 to 1893, Laws was president of the Cincinnati Columbian Exposition Association. In 1894, she was one of the seven founders of the Cincinnati Woman's Club, and its first president. She was president of the Ohio Federation of Women's Clubs from 1907 to 1909. She served on the local program committee of the biennial meeting of the General Federation of Women's Clubs, when it met in Cincinnati in 1910. She was president of the Cincinnati chapter of the Daughters of the American Revolution. She helped to organize Cincinnati's Ladies' Musical Club, the Folk-Lore Society, and the Storytellers' Guild, and she sang in the city's May Festival Chorus. She was a member of the Women's Council of Defense in Cincinnati during World War I. "It would be difficult to name any altruistic endeavor that had not received the support or indorsement of Miss Laws," noted a 1927 tribute.

== Publications ==
- "Introduction", in The Kindergarten; Reports of the Committee of Nineteen on the Theory and Practice of the Kindergarten (1913)
- History of the Ohio Federation of Women’s Clubs for the First Thirty Years, 1894–1924 (1924, editor and compiler)

== Personal life and legacy ==
Laws lived with her younger sister Alice in Avondale, Ohio. She died at Christ Hospital in Cincinnati in 1927, at the age of 72. There is a collection of papers related to Laws in the University of Cincinnati Libraries, which also holds the records of the Cincinnati Kindergarten Association. A portrait of Annie Laws, painted by Dixie Selden, is in the collection of the University of Cincinnati Fine Arts Collection. The Annie Laws Auditorium at the University of Cincinnati was built and named in her memory.
