= Alice Putnam =

American educator

Alice H. Putnam (1841 – January 19, 1919) was an educator who opened the first private kindergarten in Chicago in 1874, and was described as "the pioneer of the Kindergarten" in that city.

== Life ==
Putnam "became interested in the kindergarten when her children were young". She therefore "found ways of combining her own mothering with working to help others to become better mothers". "Realizing that she needed kindergarten training, Putnam took her oldest daughter with her to Columbus, Ohio, where she studied in a training school run by Anna J. Ogden".

She left her home to study the new method of education, and came back filled with the principles and philosophy of Froebel. How well she did her work, hundreds can testify who sat in her classes and took her training in the Chicago Froebel Kindergarten Training School. These pupils are scattered all over the world wherever the education of little children is going forward, and there you will find the spirit and teaching of Alice H. Putnam.

In 1879, Putnam was joined in Chicago by Elizabeth Harrison, who became Putnam's assistant for a year before continuing with her own studies elsewhere. In 1880 Putnam took over a Chicago training class that had been started by Anna J. Ogden, which then became the Chicago Froebel Association, directed by Putnam until 1910. Putnam was a member of the International Kindergarten Union from its organization, in 1883, until her death, serving on its most important committees, and twice as its president.

Putnam was also directly involved in the founding and operation of the Chicago Free Kindergarten Association and the Chicago Kindergarten Club, both of which sponsored various programs throughout the city.

After studying with Maria Kraus-Boelte and Susan Blow, she became a kindergarten trainer. Putnam worked with other Progressive reformers in the Chicago area, including Jane Addams, John Dewey, and Francis W. Parker. She taught kindergarten training classes at Hull House, the University of Chicago, and Cook County Normal School. In 1880, Putnam was instrumental in founding the Chicago Free Kindergarten Association and the Chicago Froebel Association where numerous American kindergarten teachers were trained. Known for her practical, non-dogmatic approach to the kindergarten and her child-centered methods, Putnam influenced many younger kindergarten teachers, including Anna Bryan, whom she trained, and Annie Howe, who brought kindergarten to Japan.

== Death ==
She was interred at Oak Woods Cemetery, Chicago, on January 21, 1919.
