= Rust (surname) =

Family name

Rust is an English surname. It comes from the Old English "rust" which meant "red" and was originally used as a nickname for those with red hair.

== People ==
- Albert Rust (1818–1870), American politician
- Albert Rust (footballer) (born 1953), French footballer
- Alfred Rust (1900–1983), German archaeologist and prehistorian
- Annie Coolidge Rust, 19th-century American educator
- Bernhard Rust (1883–1945), Minister of Education in Nazi Germany
- Bryan Rust (born 1992), American ice hockey player
- Edward B. Rust (1883–1958), American architect
- Elizabeth Lownes Rust (1835–1899), American philanthropist, humanitarian, Christian missionary
- Friedrich Wilhelm Rust (1739–1796), German violinist and composer
- Giacomo Rust (1741–1786), Italian composer
- Ingo Rust (born 1978), German politician
- John Rust (born 1955), American economist
- Mathias Rust (born 1968), German pilot who landed on the Red Square in 1987
- Paul Rust (born 1981), American actor
- Richard S. Rust (1815–1906), American abolitionist and educator
- Rod Rust (1928–2018), American football coach
- Wilhelm Karl Rust (1787–1855), German pianist
- Yvonne Rust (1922–2002), New Zealand potter

== See also ==
- Rust (disambiguation)
