= Maria Kraus-Boelté =

German-born American educator

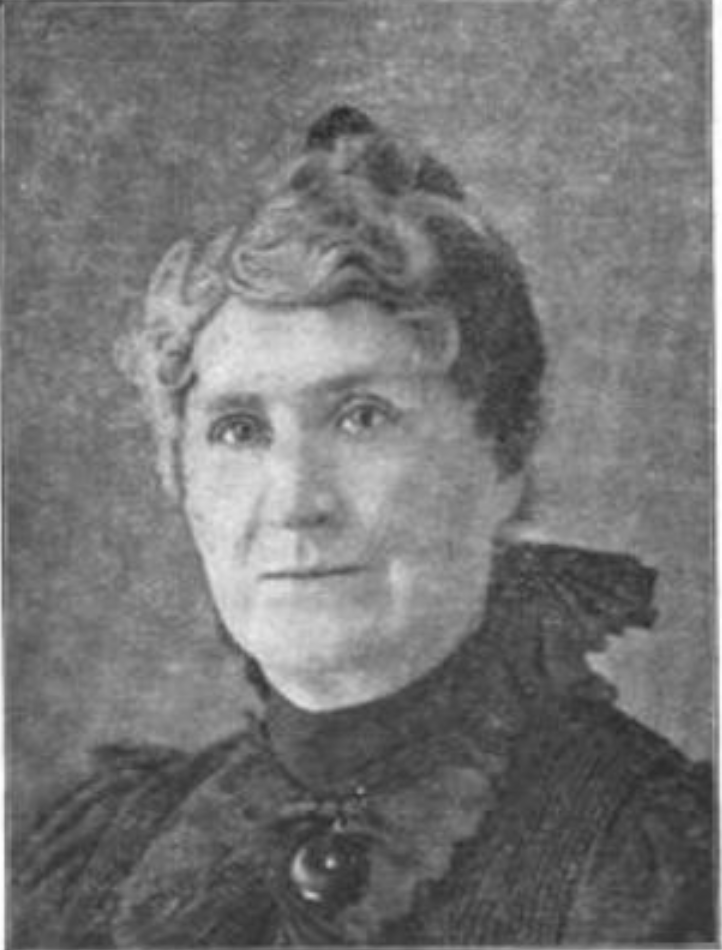
- Kraus-Boelté in 1898
- Born: November 8, 1836; Hagenow, Grand Duchy of Mecklenburg-Schwerin
- Died: November 1, 1918 (aged 81); Atlantic City, New Jersey
- Resting place: Woodlawn Cemetery
- Occupation: Educator
- Spouse: John Kraus (m. 1873; died 1896)

Maria Kraus-Boelté (1836–1918) was a pioneer of Fröbel education in the United States, and helped promote kindergarten training as suitable for study at university level.

== Biography ==
Born to a prosperous family in Hagenow in the Grand Duchy of Mecklenburg-Schwerin, on November 8, 1836, Maria Boelté was privately educated. She became interested in Fröbel education and trained with Luise Fröbel (Fröbel's widow) in Hamburg, before teaching for four years in an English kindergarten run by one of Fröbel's own pupils, Bertha Ronge. Some of her pupils' work was exhibited at the 1862 London International Exhibition. She returned to Hamburg in 1867, then opened her own kindergarten in Lübeck.

In 1868, Elizabeth Peabody invited her to come to Boston, but she refused. In 1872, she was invited again to come to work in New York City where she established a kindergarten class and training program for mothers. She got to know her future husband, Professor John Kraus, an assistant at the National Bureau of Education with whom she had previously corresponded. In 1873, they opened a Seminary for Kindergartners alongside a model kindergarten class, the Normal Training Kindergarten, and published The Kindergarten Guide (two volumes, 1877; new edition, 1905) for "the Self-instruction of Kindergartners, mothers, and nurses."

The Seminary was an early center for Fröbel's ideas in the US, and had considerable influence, especially because of Kraus-Boelté's personal connection with Luise Fröbel. Hundreds of teachers completed the training of one year's course work followed by one year's practice teaching; thousands of children passed through the kindergarten.

Kraus died in 1896, and Maria Kraus-Boelté continued the work alone. She was president of the Kindergarten Department of the National Education Association in 1899–1890 and three years later persuaded the New York University School of Education to include the first ever college level course in kindergarten education in their summer program. Kraus-Boelté herself taught this course three times. She retired in 1913 and died on November 1, 1918, in Atlantic City. Her grave is in Woodlawn Cemetery, New York.

== Works ==
- Maria Kraus-Boelté and John Kraus, The Kindergarten Guide (1882), republished by Kindergarten Messenger (January, 2001) Full text online
- Article in The kindergarten and its relation to elementary education (Chicago 1907)
- Characteristics of Froebel's Method, Kindergarten Training in Foster Wygant, Art in American Schools in the Nineteenth Century (Cincinnati 1983) - facsimile of NEA Proceedings (1879)

Some of her work is in the archives of the Association of Childhood Education International:

- The Kindergarten and the Mission of Woman: My experience as trainer of kindergarten-teachers in this country. An address., Maria Kraus-Boelté, 1877 (Published as booklet by E.Steiger.)
- An Interpretation of Some of the Froebelian Kindergarten Principles, Maria Kraus-Boelté, 1907

The Cincinnati Kindergarten Association has some of her.

== See also ==
- Susan Blow
- Elizabeth Harrison

== Sources ==
- Robert McHenry, ed. (1983). Famous American Women: A Biographical Dictionary from Colonial Times to the Present. Courier Dover Publication. ISBN 0486245233.
- The Kindergarten in The Galaxy (October 1876)
- Edward Wiebe, Paradise of Childhood: a Practical Guide to Kindergartners (1906)
- Women of Woodlawn
