= Sustainable Development Goal 4 =

4th of 17 Sustainable Development Goals to achieve quality education for all

- Mission statement: "Ensure inclusive and equitable quality education and promote lifelong learning opportunities for all"
- Commercial?: No
- Type of project: Non-Profit
- Location: Global
- Founder: United Nations
- Established: 2015
- Website: sdgs.un.org

Sustainable Development Goal 4 (SDG 4) is a commitment to ensuring inclusive and equitable quality education and promoting lifelong learning opportunities for all. This goal aims to provide children and young people with quality and easy access to education, as well as other learning opportunities, and supports the reduction of inequalities. The key targets of SDG 4 include ensuring that all girls and boys complete free, equitable, and quality primary and secondary education, increasing the number of youth and adults who have relevant skills for employment, and eliminating gender disparities in education.

Despite progress in increasing access to education, significant challenges remain, including the fact that 262 million children and youth aged 6 to 17 were still out of school in 2017, and more than half of children and adolescents are not meeting minimum proficiency standards in reading and mathematics. The COVID-19 pandemic has also had a devastating impact on education, with hundreds of millions of children and young people falling behind in their learning. To achieve SDG 4, increased investment in education, particularly in developing countries, and international cooperation and partnerships are essential.

SDG 4 has 10 targets which are measured by 11 indicators. The seven outcome targets are: free primary and secondary education; equal access to quality pre-primary education; affordable technical, vocational and higher education; increased number of people with relevant skills for financial success; elimination of all discrimination in education; universal literacy and numeracy; and education for sustainable development and global citizenship. The three means of implementation targets are: build and upgrade inclusive and safe schools; expand higher education scholarships for developing countries; and increase the supply of qualified teachers in developing countries.

SDG 4 aims to provide children and young people with quality and easy access to education and other learning opportunities. One of its targets is to achieve universal literacy and numeracy. A major component in acquiring knowledge and skills is the learning environment. Hence, SDG4 identifies a need to build more educational facilities and also upgrade the present ones to provide safe, inclusive, and effective learning environments for all.

Major progress has been made in access to education, specifically at the primary school level, for both boys and girls. In terms of the progress made, global participation in tertiary education reached 225 million in 2018, equivalent to a gross enrollment ratio of 38%.

== Background ==
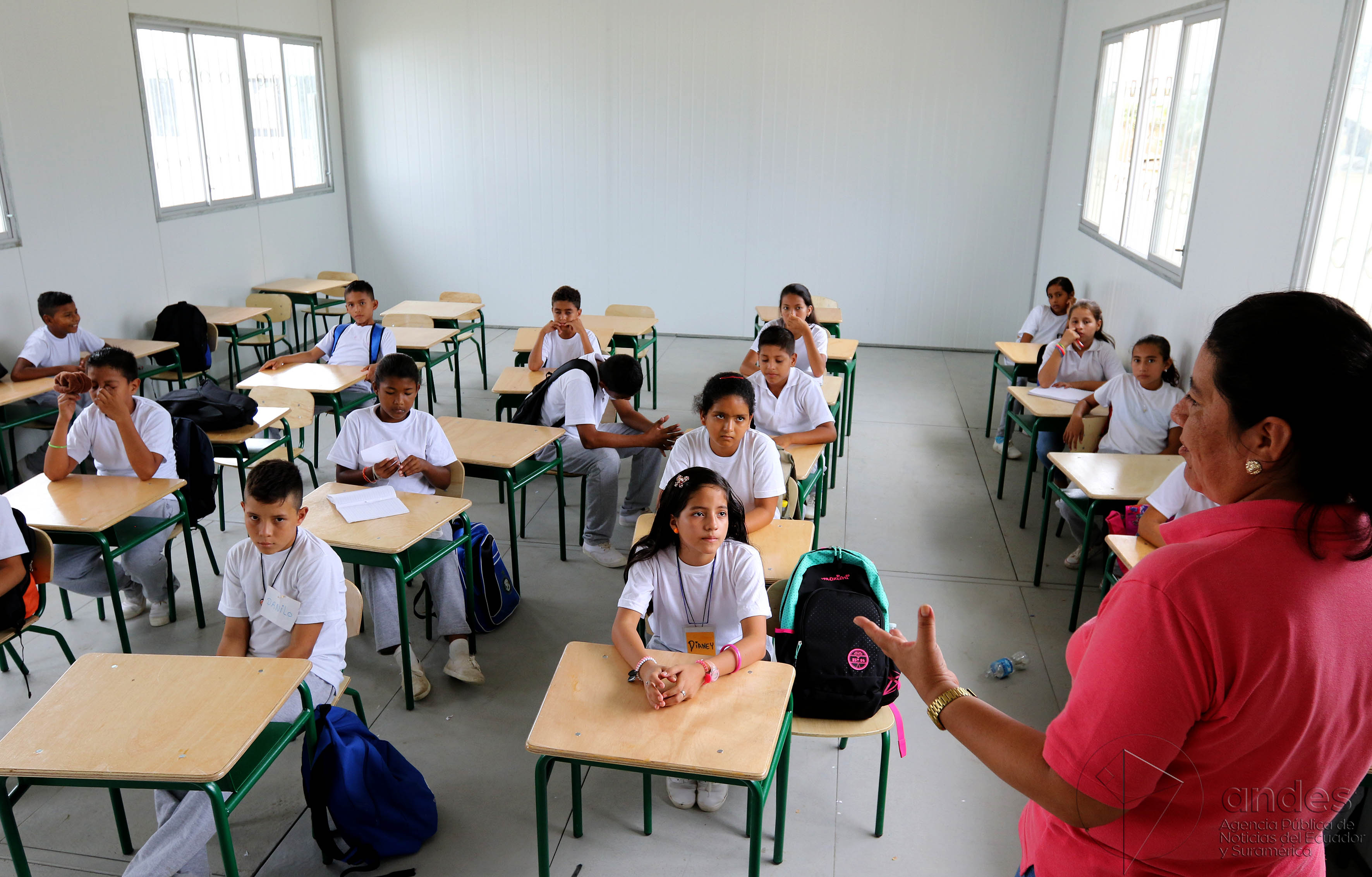
Students affected by earthquake in new temporary class in Ecuador

"Education for All" has been a popular slogan and has been given attention through different international development courses ever since 1990. It was considered critical at the inception of the Sustainable Development Goals (SDGs) and tagged SDG 4. Education is seen as a force for sustainable development, nation-building and peace. Children and young people who gain certain skills such as reading, writing, or counting are more likely to have a better future than their peers who lack these skills.

The role of education in ensuring sustainable development is not limited to developing regions; but the whole world at large. The major aim of Sustainable Development Goal 4 (SDG 4) is to provide an inclusive and high-quality education that will improve the learner's standard of living and the community's future.

Major progress has been made in promoting access to education, specifically at the primary school level, for both boys and girls. Sub-Saharan African countries experienced an increase in primary education completion rate from 49 percent in 2000 to 60 percent in 2006.

However, increased access does not always translate to improved quality of education or completion of primary school. During the implementation of the MDGs, increment in school enrolment did not translate to improved educational outcomes.

Across the world, limited access to the internet has also adversely impacted students' ability to engage in learning opportunities.

== Targets, indicators, and progress ==
Since 2015, contributions on behalf of GCE's policy were made to give precise division for SDG4.

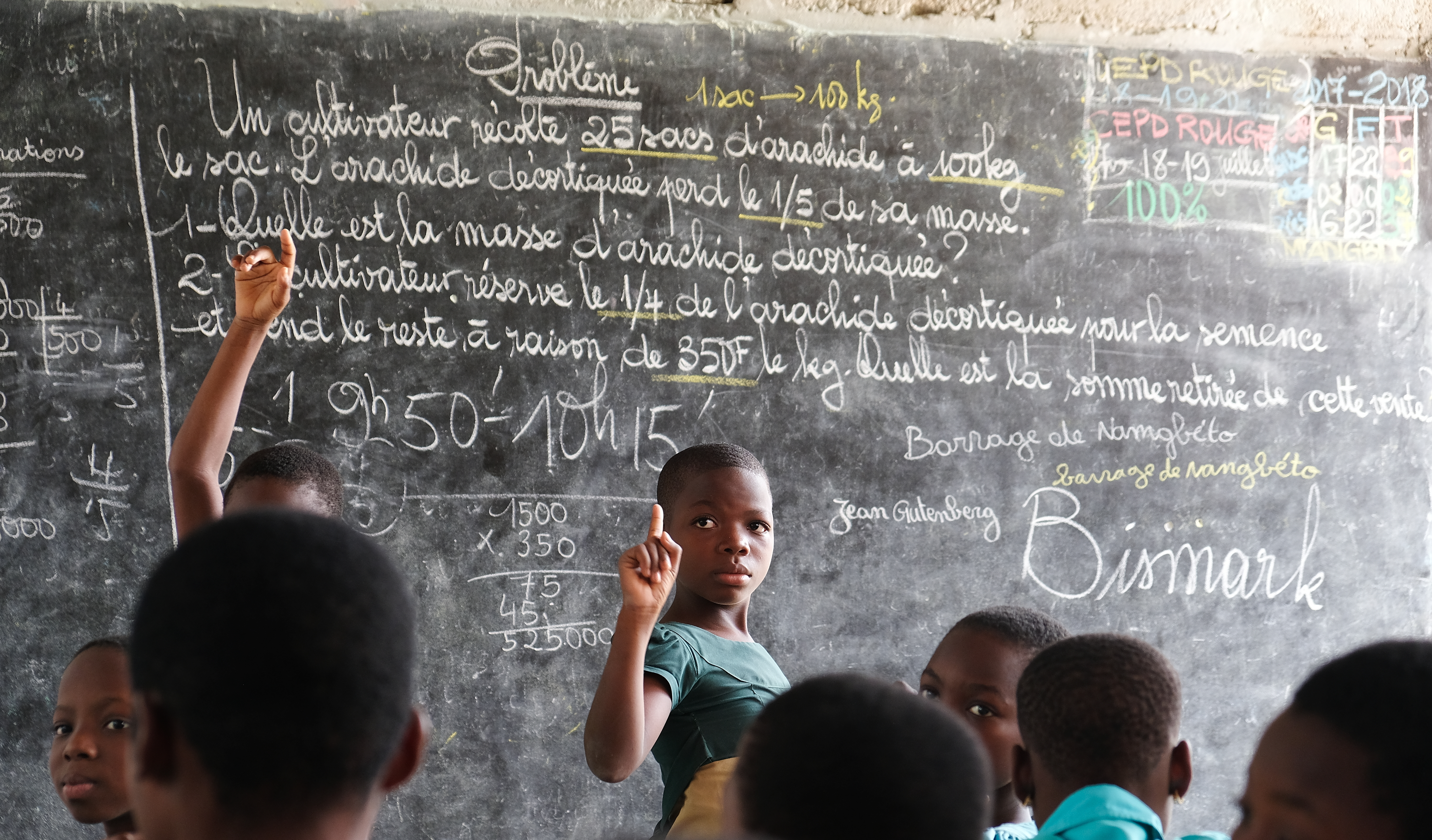
School children during a lecture in Togo

SDG 4 consists of 7 targets, 3 means of actual application, and 12 indicators. Eight of them are supposed to be achieved by 2030, while one is to be achieved by 2020 and the rest have no target years. Each of the targets has one or more indicators to measure progress. The targets include free primary and secondary education (4.1), equal access to quality pre-primary education (4.2), equal access to affordable technical, vocational and higher education (4.3), increase the number of people with relevant skills for financial success (4.4), eliminate all discrimination in education (4.5), universal literacy and numeracy (4.6), education for sustainable development and global citizenship (4.7), build and upgrade inclusive and safe schools (4. a), expand higher education scholarships for developing countries (4. b) and increase the supply of qualified teachers in developing countries (4. c)

=== Target 4.1: Free primary and secondary education ===
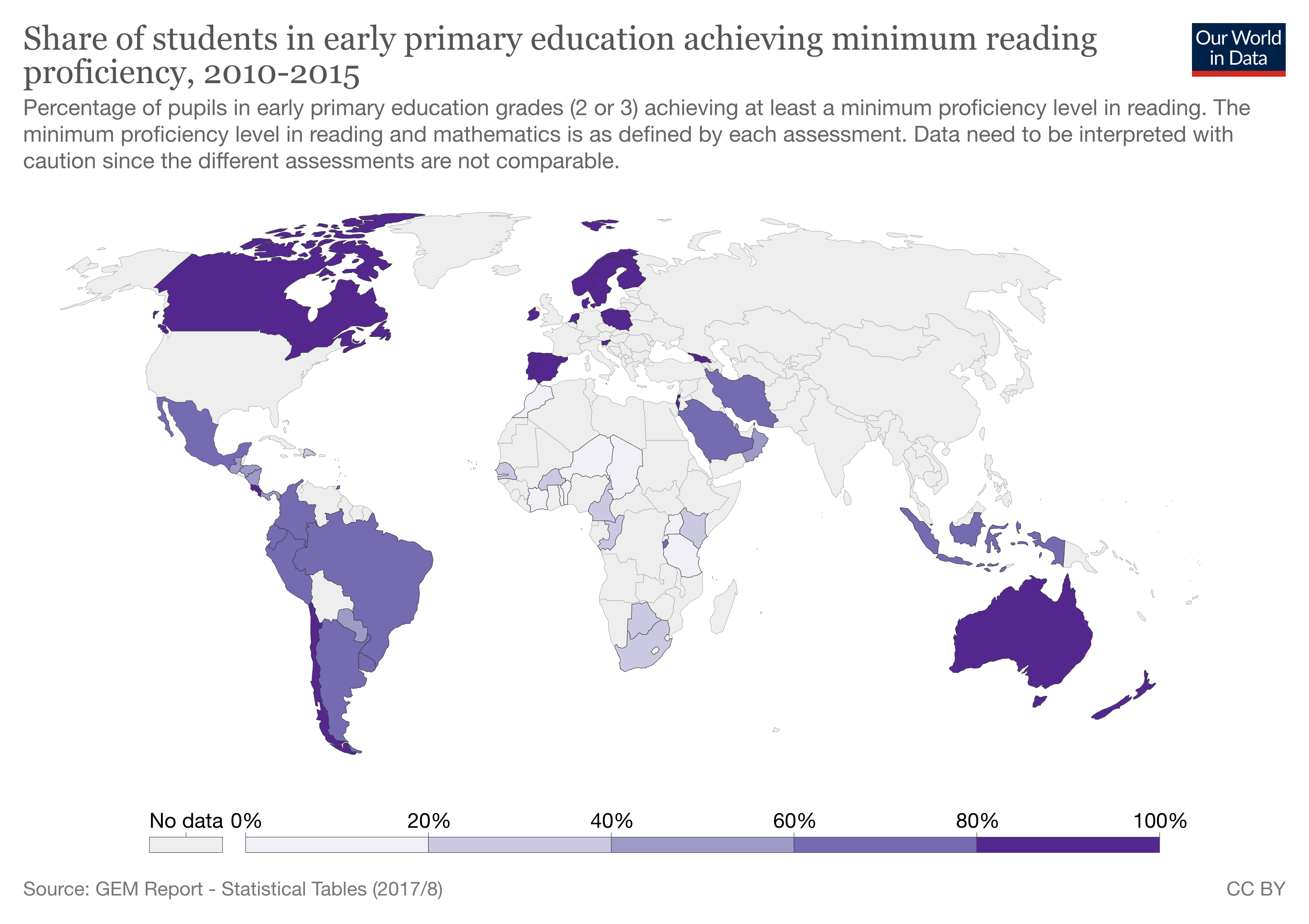
World map for indicator 4.1.1 in 2015 - Percentage of pupils in early primary education grades (2 or 3) achieving at least a minimum proficiency level in reading.

The main mission of this target is: "By 2030, ensure that all girls and boys complete free, equitable and quality primary and secondary education leading to a relevant and effective learning outcome."

In choosing this mission, different issues were considered, with the mission statement itself stipulating that: students are publicly-funded, engaged through inclusive education regardless of their differences, resources, and means are equitably distributed, education has to be instrumental towards a profound learning outcome regardless of race, gender or ethnicity.

This target has two indicators:

- Indicator 4.1.1: "Proportion of children and young people (a) in grade 2/3; (b) at the end of primary; and (c) at the end of lower secondary achieving at least a minimum proficiency level in (i) reading and (ii) Mathematics, by sex"
- Indicator 4.1.2: "Completion rate (primary education, lower secondary education, upper secondary education)".

Non-proficiency rates remain disturbingly high despite steady growth in enrollment over the years. 88 percent of children (202 million) of primary and lower secondary school age were not proficient in reading, and 84 percent (193 million) were not proficient in Mathematics in 2015 in sub-Saharan Africa.

The COVID-19 pandemic led to school closures worldwide which made these inequalities worse.

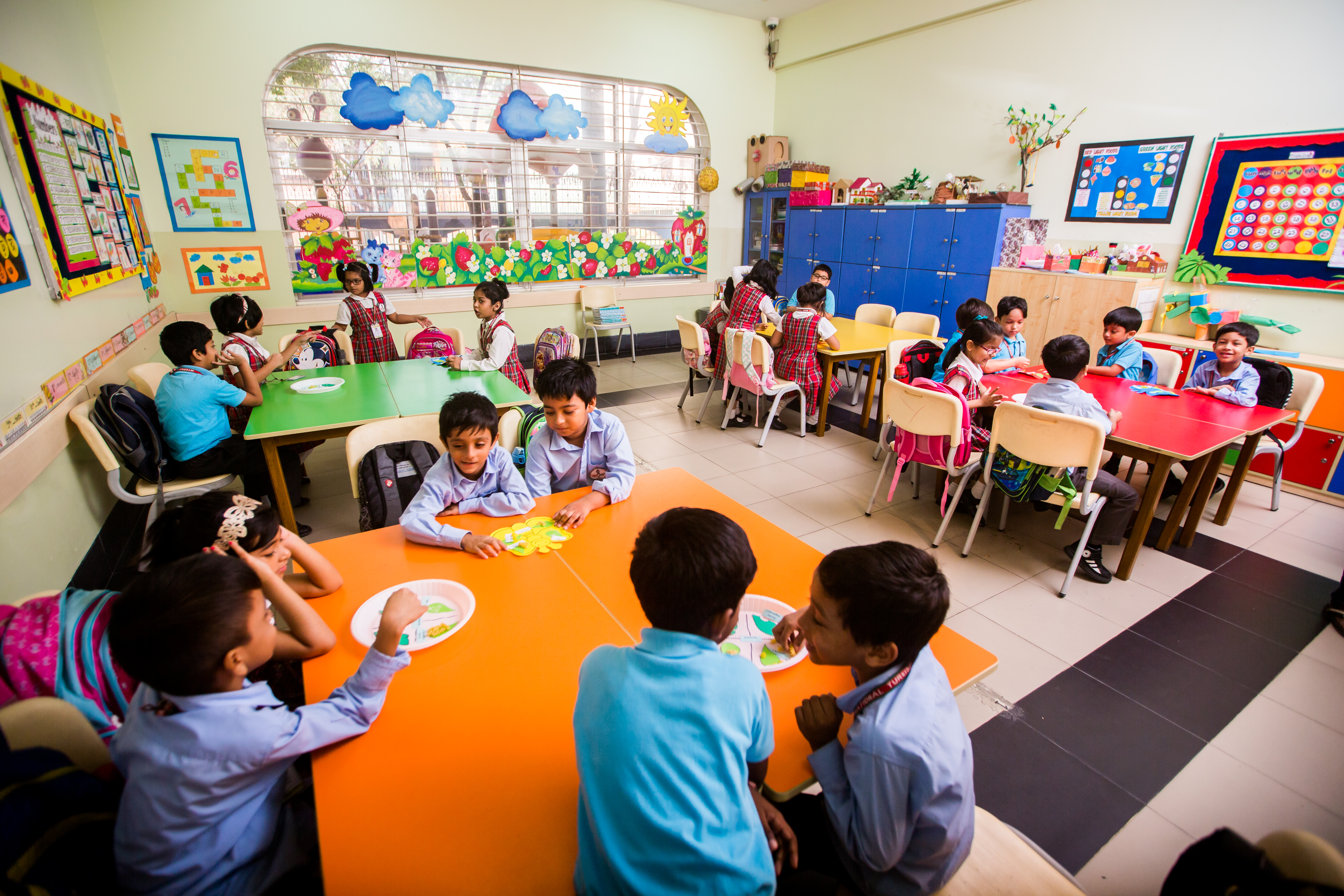
Class Room of International Bangladesh Hope School in Bangladesh.

The importance of SDG 4 in this target lies in strategically working on the learner's character and academic level for a better world.

=== Target 4.2: Equal access to quality pre-primary education ===
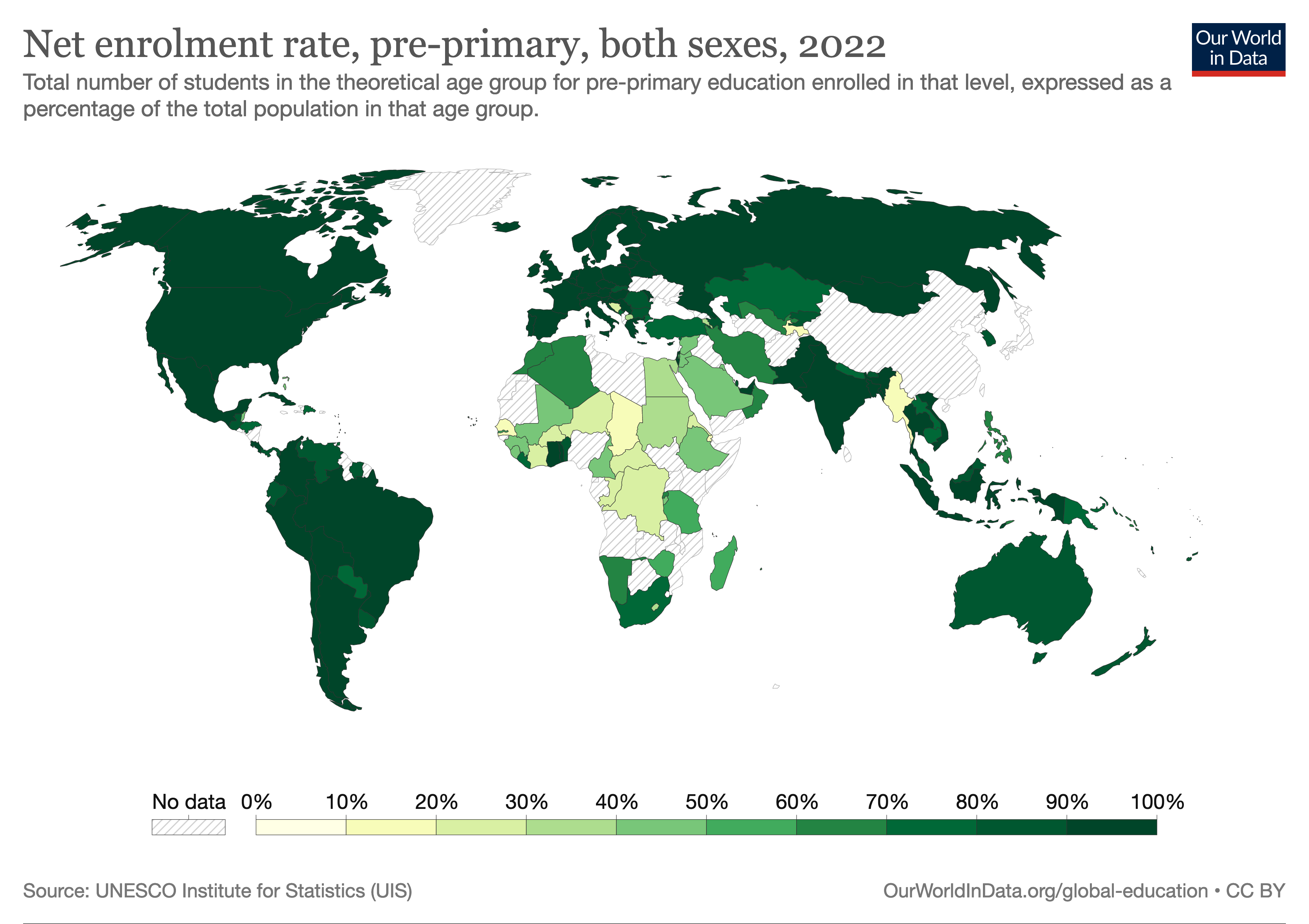
World map for indicator 4.2.2 in 2015 - Total number of students in the theoretical age group for pre-primary education enrolled in that level, expressed as a percentage of the total population in that age group.

The full main aim of this target is: "By 2030, ensure that all girls and boys have access to quality early childhood development, care and pre‑primary education so that they are ready for primary education."

This target has two indicators:

- Indicator 4.2.1: "Proportion of children under 5 years of age who are developmentally on track in health, learning, and psychosocial well-being, by sex"
- Indicator 4.2.2: "Participation rate in organized learning (one year before the official primary entry age), by sex"

At the global level, the participation rate in early childhood education was 69 percent in 2017, up from 63 percent in 2010. However, considerable disparities were found among least developed countries with rates ranging from 7 percent to nearly 100 percent. Sub-Saharan Africa faces the biggest challenges in the provision of basic school resources.

As much as the emphasis is laid on the imbalances between compared countries, the crucial aspect of gender equality even in education should not be overlooked.

It has been proposed in 2020 that Indicator 4.2.1 should be deleted: "the portion of the indicator that measures progress for children 0-23 months that is currently tier III is proposed to be deleted".

=== Target 4.3: Equal access to affordable technical, vocational, and higher education ===
The full title of this target is: "By 2030, ensure equal access for all women and men to affordable and quality technical, vocational and tertiary education, including university."

This target has one indicator: Indicator 4.3.1 is "Participation rate of youth and adults in formal and non-formal education and training in the previous 12 months, by sex".

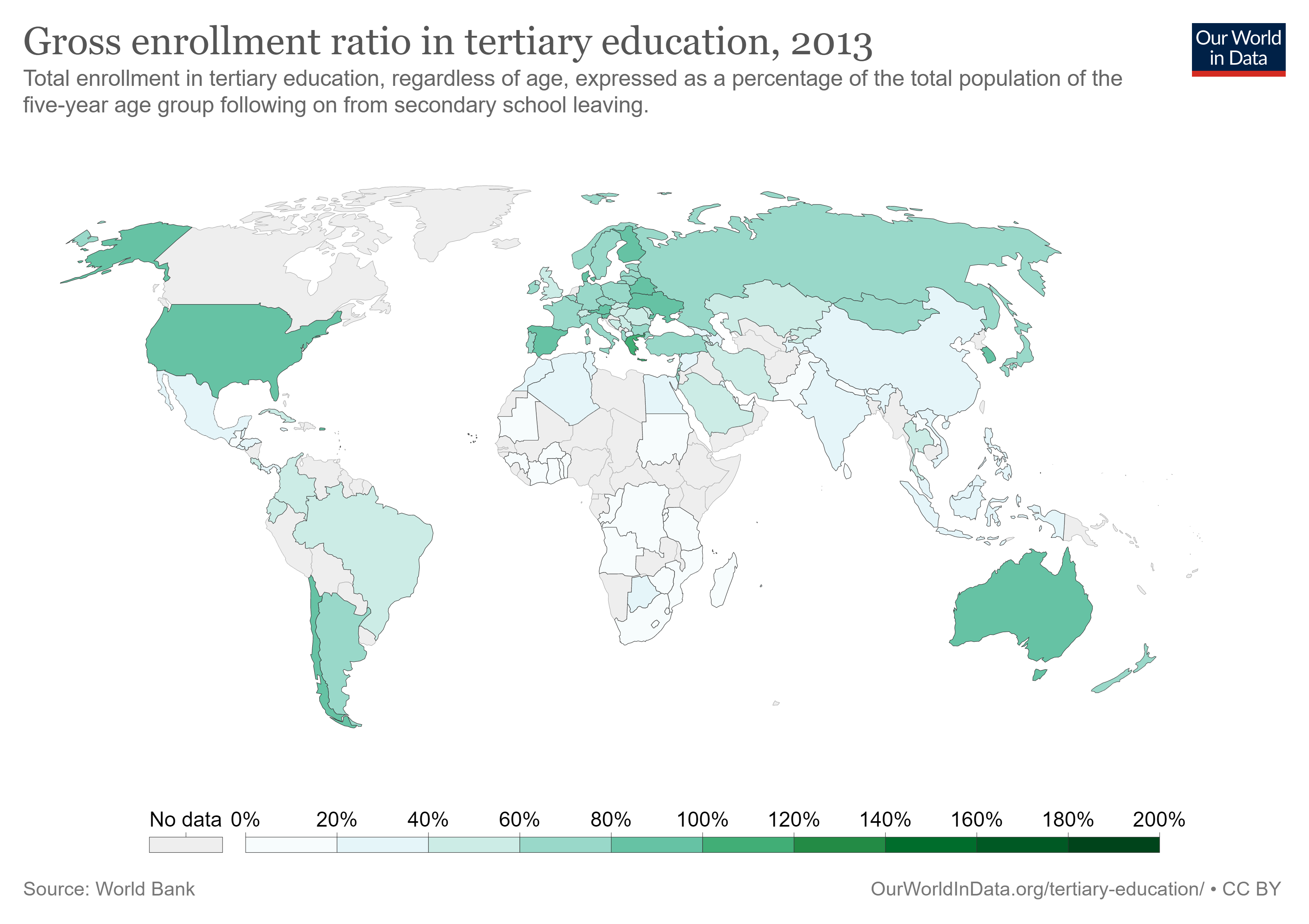
SDG 4 - Indicator 4.3.1 gross-enrollment-ratio-in-tertiary-education.

In terms of the progress made, global participation in tertiary education reached 224 million in 2018, equivalent to a gross enrollment ratio of 38%. North Africa and West Asia are among the top regions with the most rapid expansion of tertiary education participation since 2013.

Studies have shown that investment to education boost a positive mainstream for children to study at schools. In addition, computer-assisted learning had more positive effect compared to having new teaching materials.

=== Target 4.4: Increase the number of people with relevant skills for financial success ===
The full title of this target is: "By 2030, substantially increase the number of youth and adults who have relevant skills, including technical and vocational skills, for employment, decent jobs and entrepreneurship."

This target has one Indicator: Indicator 4.4.1 is the "Proportion of youth and adults with information and communications technology (ICT) skills, by type of skill".

World map for indicator 4.5.1 - Ratio of female school life expectancy to the male school life expectancy

=== Target 4.5: Eliminate all discrimination in education ===
The full title of this target is: "By 2030, eliminate gender disparities in education and ensure equal access to all levels of education and vocational training for the vulnerable, including persons with disabilities, indigenous peoples and children in vulnerable situations."

This target has one indicator: Indicator 4.5.1 is "Parity indices (female/male, rural/urban, bottom/top wealth quintile and others such as disability status, indigenous peoples and conflict-affected, as data become available) for all education indicators"

In 2016, two-thirds of 750 million adults were illiterate women. Adult literacy rates are lowest in sub-Saharan Africa and Southern Asia. Southern Asia alone is home to nearly half (49 percent) of the global population who are illiterate. The agenda can be challenging for those regions or countries to reach the goal by 2030 because income and gender inequality are seen more often in higher educational levels.

While disabled students are increasing in higher educational institutions, many institutions, while disabled students face barriers on a daily bases, are not ready to support those students yet.

=== Target 4.6: Universal literacy and numeracy ===
The full title of this target is: "By 2030, ensure that all youth and a substantial proportion of adults, both men, and women, achieve literacy and numeracy."

This target has one indicator: Indicator 4.6.1 is the "Proportion of population in a given age group achieving at least a fixed level of proficiency in functional (a) literacy and (b) numeracy skills, by sex".

Population census and household surveys regarding simple sentences used in daily life will identify literacy data. It is one of the processes to recognize the current literacy data in order to achieve the goals set forth by the SDGs. "Despite the steady rise in literacy rates over the past 50 years, there are still 773 million illiterate adults around the world, most of whom are women".

To facilitate the expansion of comprehensively designed basic learning programs, providing a variety of learning methods and setting standards for gradual progression by ability are required. In order to expand the learning programs, more precise information collection is required. To collect this information, Global Alliance to Monitor Learning (GAML) is developing the necessary tools for methodology and standardization.

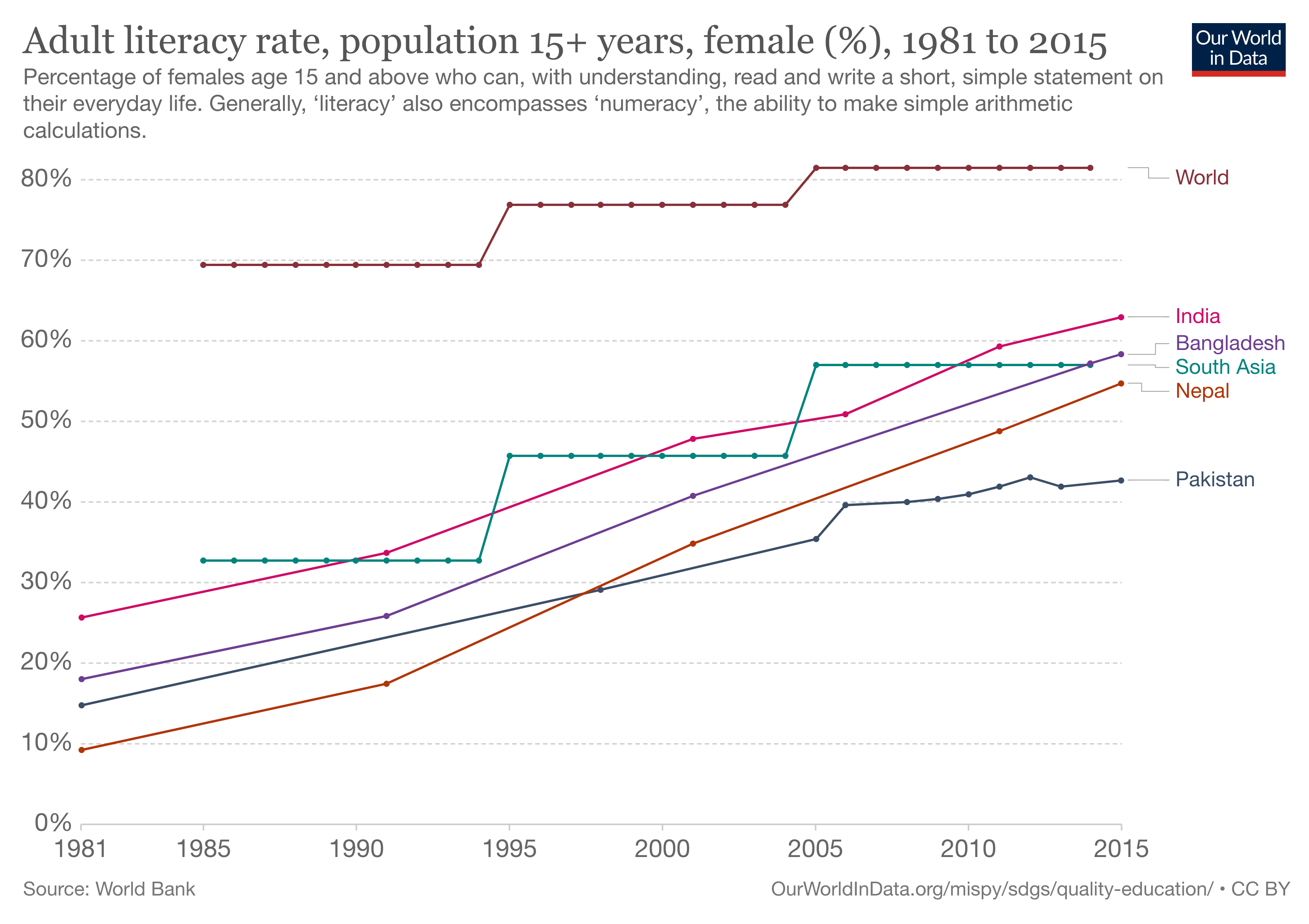
Percentage of females age 15 and above who can, with understanding, read and write a short, simple statement on their everyday life

=== Target 4.7: Education for sustainable development and global citizenship ===
The full title of this target is: "By 2030, ensure that all learners acquire the knowledge and skills needed to promote sustainable development, including, among others, through education for sustainable development and sustainable lifestyles, human rights, gender equality, promotion of a culture of peace and non-violence, global citizenship and appreciation of cultural diversity and of culture's contribution to sustainable development."

This target has one indicator: Indicator 4.7.1 is the "Extent to which (i) global citizenship education and (ii) education for sustainable development, including gender equality and human rights, are mainstreamed at all levels in (a) national education policies; (b) curricula; (c) Teacher education; and (d) student assessment"

There is currently no data available for this indicator.

The Sustainable Development Solutions Network (SDSN) has proposed a SDG Global Monitoring Indicators arranged for SDG 4.7 to calculate the percentage of girls and boys achieving proficiency in literacy and mathematics, by the end of lower secondary schooling cycle based on national benchmarks. This indicator can be used to compare across countries and see the improvements from previous years.

Education plays an important role in improving the human capital of the labor force and it "is considered as an important determinant of sustainable economic growth".

While organizations around the world are putting efforts to achieve this goal, some critics suggest the UN Decade might seem too ideal. Some scholars also pointed out that although higher educational institutions are striving for sustainable development, they are still on their early stage.

=== Target 4.a: Build and upgrade inclusive and safe schools ===
The full title of this target is: "Build and upgrade education facilities that are child, disability and gender sensitive and provide safe, non-violent, inclusive and effective learning environments for all."

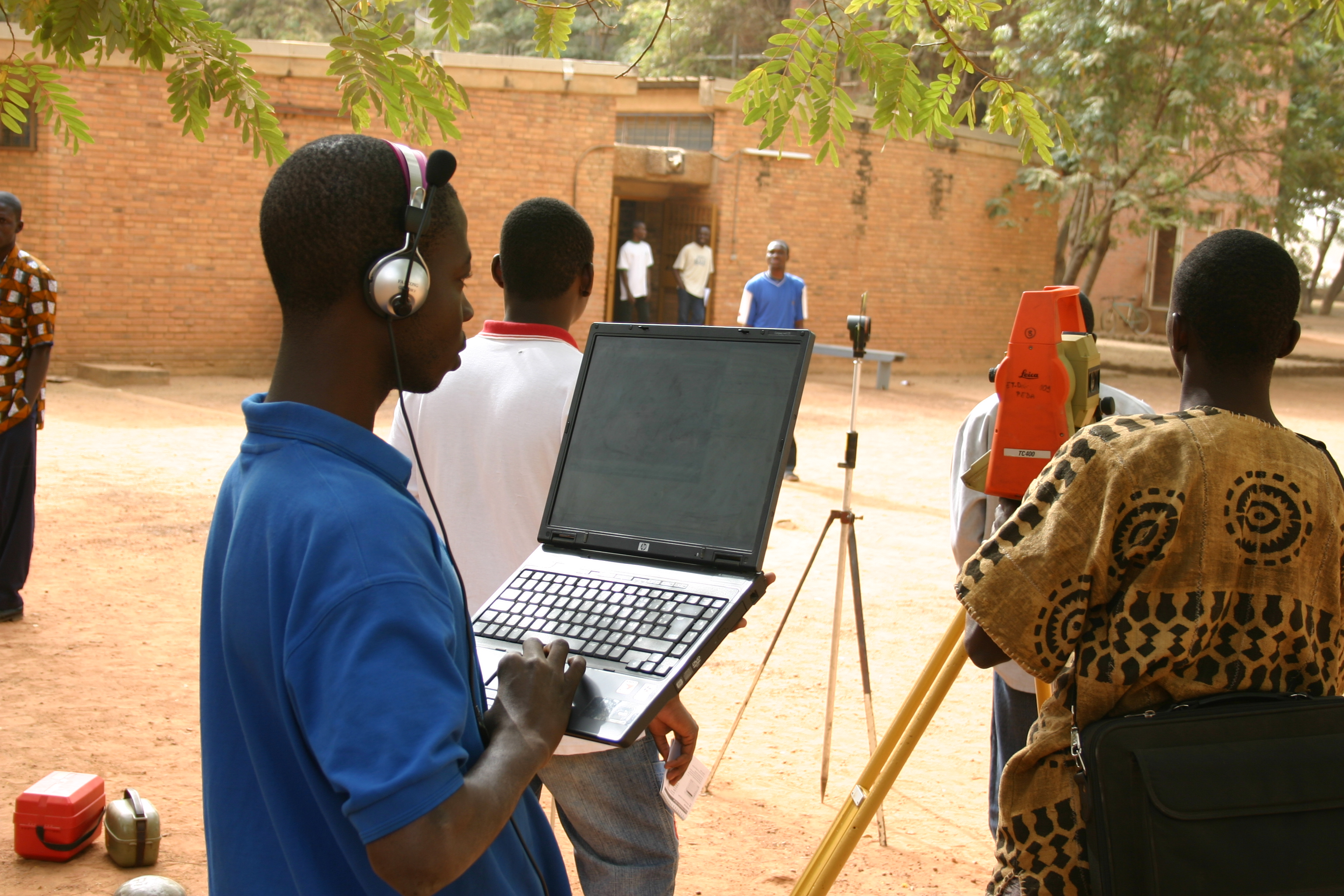
Students using modern technologies during a field trip

This target has one indicator: Indicator 4.a.1 is the "Proportion of schools with access to (a) electricity; (b) the Internet for pedagogical purposes; (c) computers for pedagogical purposes; (d) adapted infrastructure and materials for students with disabilities; (e) basic drinking water; (f) single-sex basic sanitation facilities; and (g) basic hand-washing facilities (as per the WASH indicator definitions)"

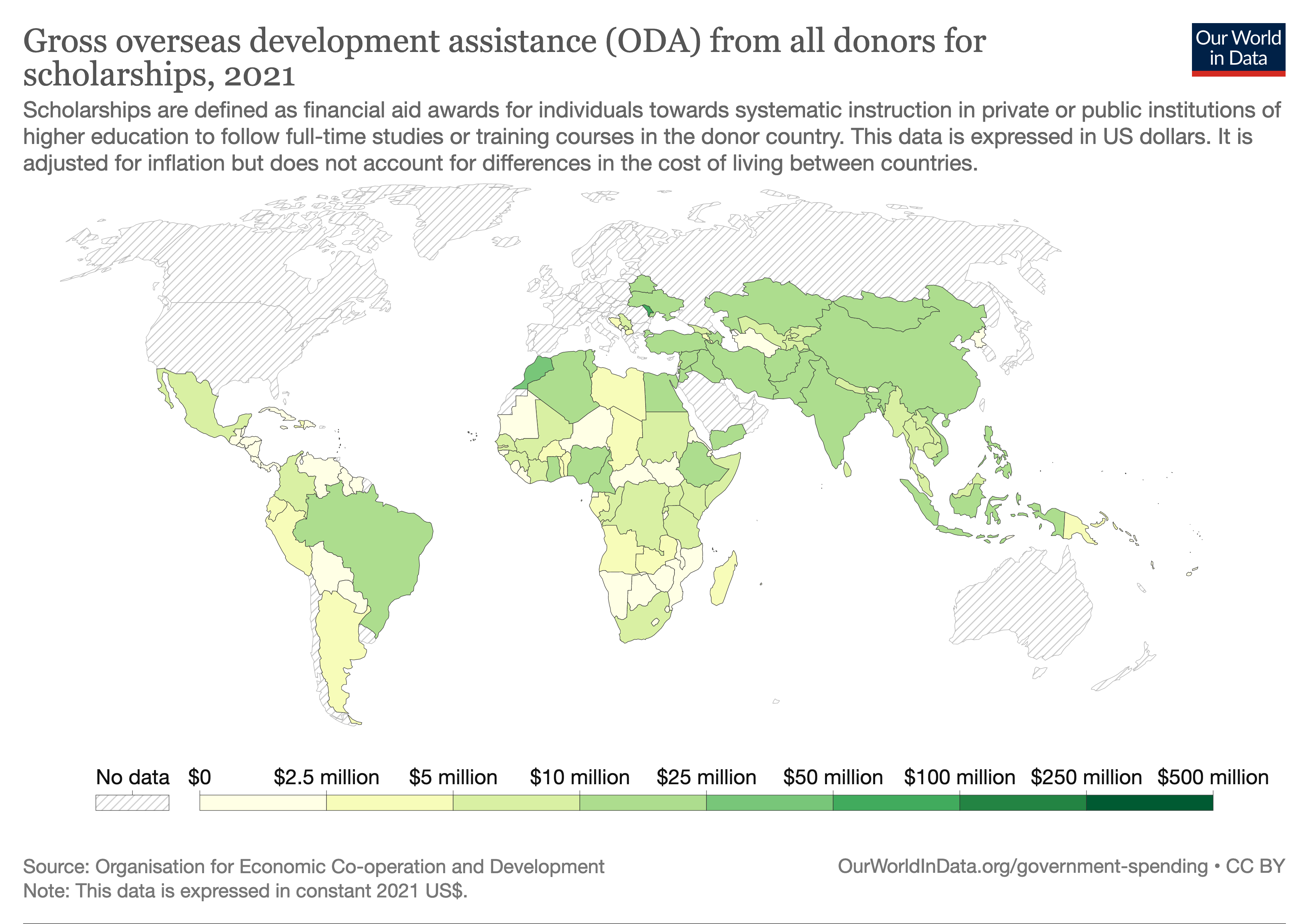
Gross disbursements of total ODA for scholarships

=== Target 4.b: Expand higher education scholarships for developing countries ===
The full title of this target is: "By 2020, substantially expand globally the number of scholarships available to developing countries, in particular least developed countries, small island developing States and African countries, for enrollment in higher education, including vocational training and information and communications technology, technical, engineering and scientific programs, in developed countries and other developing countries."

This target has one indicator: Indicator 4.b.1 is "Volume of official development assistance (ODA) flows for scholarships"

ODA for scholarships was $1.6 billion in 2018.

=== Target 4.c: Increase the supply of qualified teachers in developing countries ===
The full title of this target is: "By 2030, substantially increase the supply of qualified teachers, including through international cooperation for Teacher training in developing countries, especially least developed countries and small island developing States."

This target has one indicator: Indicator 4.c.1 is "Proportion of teachers in a) pre-primary; (b) primary; (c) lower secondary; and (d) upper secondary education who have received at least the minimum organized teacher training (e.g. pedagogical training) pre-service or in-service required for teaching at the relevant level in a given country"

Sub-Saharan Africa is behind with the lowest percentages of trained teachers in pre-primary (48 percent), primary (64 percent), and secondary (50 percent) education in 2017.

=== Custodian agencies ===
The custodian agency for most of the indicators of the targets is UNESCO-UIS. In addition, UNESCO is the custodian agency for some of the indicators. The International Telecommunication Union is the custodian agency for Indicator 4.4.1. OECD is the custodian agency for Indicator 4.b.1. UNESCO-ED/PSD/ESD is the custodian agency for indicator 4.7.1.

== Challenges ==
=== Impact of COVID-19 pandemic ===
It is estimated that at least a third of the world's children do not have the technology they need to participate in remote learning during the COVID-19 pandemic and the resulting widespread school closures. The pandemic has also resulted to an increase in educational inequalities with a completion rate of 79% for the well off and 34% for the poor households.

Just as all SDGs, achieving SDG 4—for inclusive and equitable access to education—is likely to be missed due to the COVID-19 pandemic. There is a projection that more than 200 million children will still be out of education by 2030. COVID-19 highlighted the significance of health literacy and the system's failure to provide an equal opportunity of education for everyone. Health literacy can be described as the ability of an individual to make decisions based on healthcare provider's advice. Actions are called to include health literacy in basic educational curriculum systems to foster educated individuals to slow down the spread of diseases such as COVID-19.

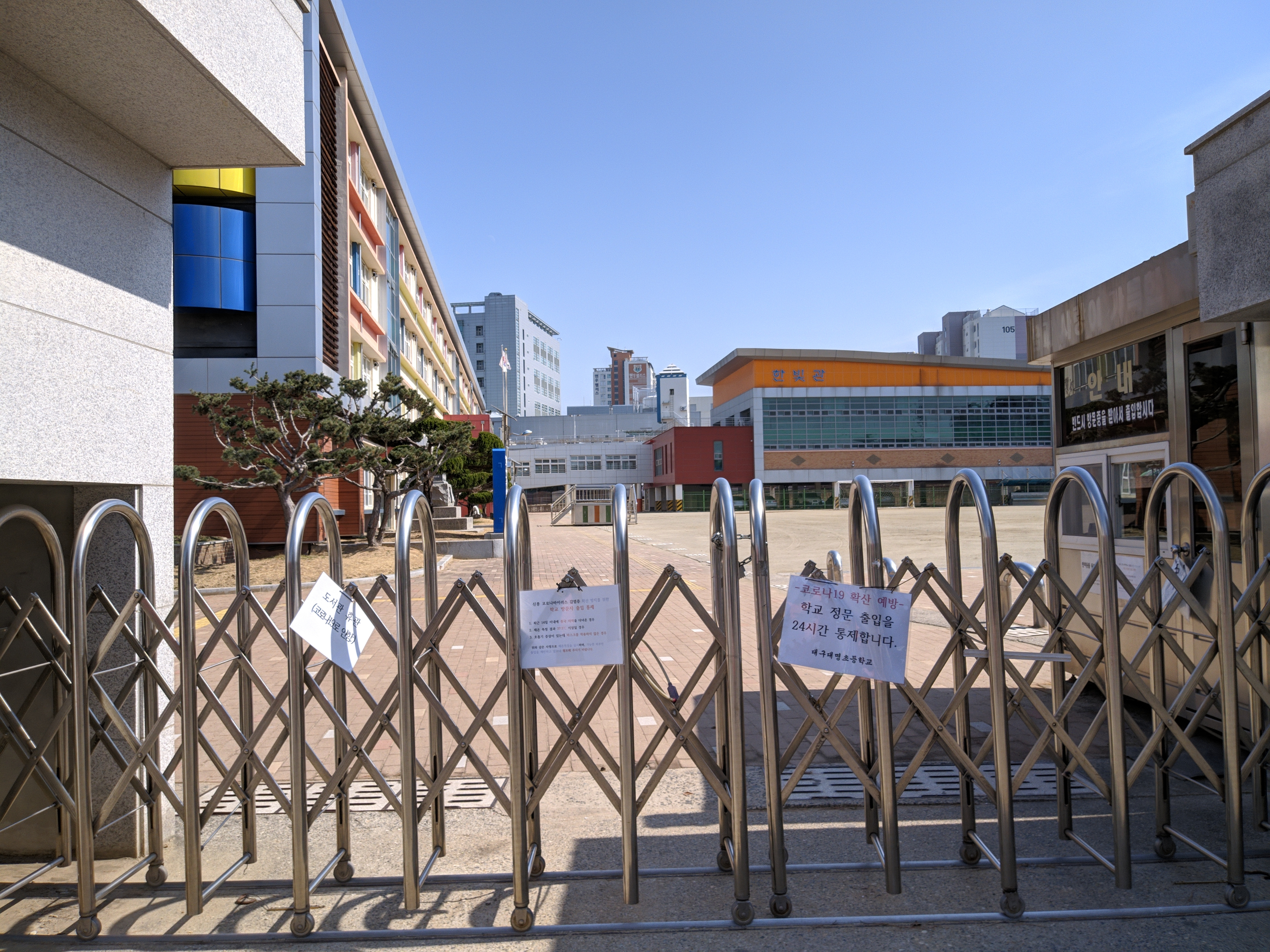
Closed Daegu Daemyeong Elementary School in South Korea during COVID-19 outbreak

After the pandemic hit, school closure (including universities) starting in April 2020 affected up to 91 percent of enrolled learners. Most of the world's children were deprived of formal education during the COVID-19 outbreak—a legacy that could threaten the SDGs' underlying ambition to leave no one behind (LNOB). In retrospect, the 2023 report estimated that about 80% of countries with available data experienced large-scale learning losses due to COVID-19.

Many educational institutions are attempting to maintain programs through online education. In OECD countries, although the impact of COVID-19 was huge, there are also possibilities to generate new types of education system. However, equity remains a major constraint on access to distance learning, as many students in developing countries do not either have access to the internet or a safe and supportive learning environment appropriate for e-learning.

To foster international collaboration and ensure that education never stops, UNESCO in March 2020 launched the COVID-19 Global Education Coalition, a multi-sector partnership between the UN family, civil society organizations, media, and IT partners to design and deploy innovative solutions.

== Links with other SDGs ==
Achieving SDG 4 will help to achieve many other SDGs: eradicate poverty (SDG 1), achieve gender equality (SDG 5), ensure good health and wellbeing (SDG 3), reduce inequalities among countries (SDG 10), promote sustained, inclusive and sustainable economic growth and decent work for all (SDG 8), build resilient infrastructure and foster innovation (SDG 9), ensure access to information and awareness for sustainable consumption and style of production in harmony with nature (SDG 12), provide education and awareness toward taking urgent action to combat climate change (SDG 13), and promote peaceful and inclusive societies (SDG 16).

== Monitoring and progress ==
An annual report is prepared by the Secretary-General of the United Nations evaluating the progress towards the Sustainable Development Goals.

Established in 2002, the Global Education Monitoring Report is an editorially independent report, hosted and published by UNESCO. It monitors the implementation of national and international strategies to help hold all relevant partners to account for their commitments, as part of the overall SDG follow-up and review process.

Progress is difficult to track as 75 percent of countries have no or insufficient data to track all the SDG 4 targets. This makes it hard to analyze and identify the children at greatest risk of being left behind. A 2019 study used computer modeling to estimate educational attainment for men and women from 2000 to 2017, mapping the results for each country to help identify areas lagging behind.

Massive open online courses (MOOCs) are free open education offered through online platforms. The initial philosophy of MOOCs was to open up quality Higher Education to a wider audience. As such, MOOCs are an important tool to achieve SDG 4. At the same time, MOOCs also contribute to Goal 5, in that they are gender-neutral and can give women and girls improved access to education.

== Organizations ==
Organizations that are involved in ensuring quality education is achieved include:

- Plan International
- UNESCO
- UNICEF
- Global Partnership for Education
- The United Nations Girls' Education Initiative
- Childhood Education International
- UN Educational, Scientific, and Cultural Organization-Institute for Statistics (UNESCO-UIS).
- United Nations Institute for Training and Research (UNITAR)
- International Telecommunication Union (ITU)
