= International Kindergarten Union =

American childhood organization

- Abbreviation: I.K.U.
- Successor: Childhood Education International
- Founder: Sarah Stewart
- Founded at: Saratoga Springs, New York, U.S.
- Fields: Kindergarten

International Kindergarten Union (IKU) was an American organization established at Saratoga Springs, New York, in 1892, in the interests of concerted action among the supporters of the kindergarten cause. in 1924, the organization was reorganized as Childhood Education International.

== Establishment ==
July 1892, at Saratoga Springs, at the 32nd Annual Meeting of the National Education Association, a number of the Kindergarten teachers of the U.S. met together to consider a proposal of Sarah Stewart of Philadelphia to form an organization which should have two purposes. The immedia purpose was to arrange for and organize an exhibit for the World's Columbian Exposition to be held the next year in Chicago and the boarder and more permanent purpose was to extend and build up Kindergarten education, to raise the professional standard, and to stabilize and deepend the work.

Mrs. Hughes of Toronto, Miss Brooks of New York, Mary McCulloch of St. Louis, Missouri, Annie Laws of Cincinnati, Mary B. Page of Chicago, and Lucy Wheelock of Boston were among those who organized the association. Not more than 50 members were there at the first meeting.

As a beginning, four distinct aims were stated:

1. To gather and disseminate knowledge of the kindergarten movement throughout the world.
2. To bring into active coöperation all kindergarten interests.
3. To promote the establishment of kindergartens.
4. To elevate the kindergartner's standard of professional training

The principles underlying the kindergarten system were the groundwork of modern primary education. An intelligent interpretation of the philosophy and method was presented by many independent workers in various parts of the world. Something like a complete system of primary education was slowly evolved from the repeated experiments of these investigators. There was a loss of value to world from the lack of coördinate effort and some common channel of communication.

The I.K.U. was formed to meet this need. It sought to unite in one stream the various kindergarten activities which already existed. Its function was to supplement, not to compete with, to coördinate, not to supplant, the agencies which were already at work. It combined the advantages of central council and suggestion with local independence and control. Its mission was to collect, collate, and disseminate the valuable knowledge already attained, and to inspire to greater and more intelligent efforts in the future. It fell naturally into the spirit and method of the times, which was no longer that of isolated effort, but of concentrated, harmonious action.

In most of the States, the kindergartens were outside of the public school system, and in the hands of private societies. It was obvious that an I.K.U. could deal only with large units. It was hoped that all of the kindergarten societies in each State, whether public or private, would unite to form one State organization for representation in the I.K.U.. The great advance which was made in the growth of kindergartens made it hopeful that there would be no State without such an organization. The I.K.U. was pledged to promote such organizations, and to the establishment of kindergartens. It invited coöperation from public and private schools, churches, and benevolent societies of every kind and grade, which had for their object the educational interests of young children.

The establishment of a high standard of training for the position of kindergarten teacher was long felt to be a necessity by those intimately connected with the work. It was of first importance that some standard be reached that would direct the future action of training schools in the preparation of teachers. The time was deemed to be past when "anybody can teach little children".

It was the work of the I.K.U. to prepare an outline of study, to advise its adoption, and to give aid and counsel whenever it was sought. The executive committee included the leading kindergarten experts of the U.S. and of Europe. Their experience and knowledge gave ample security that wise counsel would be given to all issues of importance to the cause.

A provisional constitution was adopted, the terms of which were very simple and very elastic. Each local center retained complete autonomy, and continued the activities which were begun before joining the general union.

== History ==
=== 1893 ===
The immediate aim of the I.K.U. in its second year was to prepare a fitting representation of kindergarten progress at the World's Columbian Exposition at Chicago in 1893. This event would furnish an opportunity for an interchange of views and an organization of forces for future growth. An international congress was planned for this time, where questions of importance to the cause would be discussed by the eminent kindergartenn experts of the world. It was hoped that not only finished products would be displayed, in well-graded sequence, but that practical illustrations of method would be given with the young children present.

It was discovered early on that certain important changes had to be made in membership and in dues. At a meeting of the executive board, held in Chicago in December 1894, it was decided to recognize only cities as members in the I.K.U., with the exception of the original charter members, and that dues for membership should be fixed as follows: Each city branch should pay into the general treasury US$.25 for each of its members.

=== 1894 ===
By 1894, 16 of the largest cities in the U.S. joined the union. All the kindergarten societies in each city united to form a membership in the I.K.U.. The cities were the following: Boston, Philadelphia, Washington, D.C., Providence, Rhode Island, Wilmington, Delaware, Albany, New York, Buffalo, New York, Chicago, Indianapolis, Cincinnati, Toledo, Ohio, Cleveland, St. Louis, Missouri, Des Moines, Iowa, San Francisco, and Smyrna, Turkey. These were city branches of the I.K.U. Indications were given that foreign countries would also join the union. Most of them responded promptly to the invitation to give reports of kindergarten progress in their countries, and expressed hearty sympathy with the movement.

=== 1895 ===
The regular annual meeting of the I.K.U. was called for July 12, 1895, in Denver, and brought together a representative group of sixty kindergarten experts for a discussion of the intent and purposes of such a union. Lucy Wheelock was selected to fill the vacancy of president, made by the resignation of Mrs. Sarah Cooper, at the spring meeting held in Washington in connection with the National Woman's Council. Wheelock spoke of the great movement of the time being that of federation. As in other departments of the world's work, so in education; much was being accomplished by the united action of the workers in different fields. The many kindergarten clubs and unions could accomplish far more if their efforts were combined, while the chief gain to the several clubs would be an increased interest, enthusiasm, and fellowship. Of all classes of educators, the kindergartners would profit most by a unification of interests. One of the purposes of the I.K.U. would be that of sustaining a standard for training-class work. It would define the conditions of work, where inadequate efforts were attempted, and also encourage prolonging the time of professional training. Wheelock recommended that a committee be named from among the active workers, which would consider this question of a recognized standard for normal work. She also urged increased social intercourse between the workers.

=== 1918 ===
By 1918, there were more than 18,000 members. There were nineteen committees, working in the interest of Hygiene, Child Study, Experimental tests, Arts, Science, Home and School Philanthropy, and Social Service. there was an Advisory Committee working in harmony with the Federal Bureau of Education at Washington, D.C. In addition, there was a preservation in the Annual Reports of a complete record of the growth of the Kindergarten principal and practice in the U.S. These reports contained a long series of articles and discussions by experts within and without the professional on every phase of Kindergarten. That year, the organization's convention was held in Chicago.

== Notable people ==
- Eliza Cooper Blaker
- Susan Blow
- Annie Laws
- Edith Lesley
- Alice Putnam
- Annie Coolidge Rust
- Lucy Wheelock
