= World Organization for Early Childhood Education (OMEP) =

- Organisation mondiale pour l'éducation préscolaire
- Abbreviation: OMEP
- Formation: 1948; 78 years ago
- Founded at: Prague, Czechoslovakia
- Type: International non-governmental organization
- Region served: Worldwide
- World President: Adrijana Višnjić-Jevtić
- Website: omepworld.org

The World Organization for Early Childhood Education (French: Organisation mondiale pour l'éducation préscolaire), commonly known by its French acronym OMEP, is an international non-governmental organization concerned with early childhood education and care and the rights and well-being of children from birth to eight years of age.

Founded in 1948, OMEP operates through national and preparatory committees in more than 80 countries. Its work includes advocacy, research, professional exchange, conferences and projects relating to children's rights, access to education, education for sustainable development, peace, play and the professional development of early childhood educators. OMEP has special consultative status with the United Nations Economic and Social Council and is an NGO in official partnership with UNESCO.

== History ==
OMEP developed from international efforts to strengthen cooperation on the education and welfare of young children following the Second World War. In 1946, British landscape architect and children's welfare advocate Marjory Allen, Lady Allen of Hurtwood, and Swedish diplomat and social policy advocate Alva Myrdal began discussing the creation of an international organization devoted to preschool education. They were subsequently joined by educators and officials including Suzanne Herbinière-Lebert of France and Marie Bartušková of Czechoslovakia.

A preparatory committee formed in Paris in 1946 proposed an autonomous voluntary organization that would cooperate with UNESCO. OMEP was formally established during a World Conference on Early Childhood Education held in Prague in August 1948, attended by representatives from 19 countries. Myrdal was elected as the organization's first World President.

OMEP initially consisted primarily of European national committees. The organization later expanded its membership and activities in Africa, Asia and the Pacific, Europe, Latin America, and North America and the Caribbean.

== Activities ==
OMEP advocates for access to inclusive and high-quality early childhood education and care and seeks to influence public policy at national, regional and international levels. It also supports research, professional training and the exchange of educational practices among teachers, researchers, policymakers and other people working with young children.

The organization convenes international and regional conferences. Its projects have addressed subjects including education for sustainable development, peace and global citizenship education, children's participation, access to clean water and sanitation, and the use of toy libraries and play-based learning. In cooperation with UNESCO, OMEP developed an online resource bank collecting research, policies and teaching materials on education for sustainable development in early childhood.

OMEP is represented in United Nations and UNESCO processes concerning education, children's rights and sustainable development. It participates in UNESCO's Collective Consultation of NGOs on Education 2030 and in international initiatives concerning the implementation of Sustainable Development Goal 4.

OMEP has also supported the proposed optional protocol to the Convention on the Rights of the Child on free pre-primary and secondary education, and to recognize a human right to early childhood care and education.

== Membership and governance ==
OMEP's principal members are national committees representing the organization within individual countries. Groups seeking recognition initially operate as preparatory committees and may apply to become full national committees. Full national committees have voting rights in the OMEP World Assembly, while preparatory committees participate as observers.

National committees are grouped into five regions: Africa, Asia–Pacific, Europe, Latin America, and North America and the Caribbean. Each region is led by a regional vice-president and holds regional assemblies to coordinate programmes and review activities. Mercedes Mayol Lassalle served as OMEP's World President from 2020 to 2025 and was succeeded by Adrijana Višnjić-Jevtić on 1 January 2026.

== See also ==
- Early childhood education
- Early childhood development
- Right to education
- Convention on the Rights of the Child
- Sustainable Development Goal 4
