= Rust (disambiguation) =

Rust is an iron oxide formed by the reaction of iron and oxygen in the presence of water.

Rust may also refer to:

== Arts and entertainment ==
=== Films ===
- Rust (2010 film), Canadian film
- Rust (2018 film), Brazilian film
- Rust (2024 film), American film
  - Rust shooting incident, on-set shooting incident of the film above where one person died

=== Games ===
- Rust (video game), a video game developed by Facepunch Studios
- Rust Monster, a fictional monster from the role-playing game Dungeons & Dragons

=== Music ===
- Rust Records, NY, a former US record label

==== Albums ====
- Rust (album), a 2015 album by Harm's Way
- Rust, a 2025 album by the Living Tombstone
- Rust, a 2009 release based on Rise of the Great Machine by Supermachiner

==== Songs ====
- "Rust" (song), a 1999 song by Echo & the Bunnymen
- "Rust", a 2000 song by Black Label Society from the album Stronger Than Death
- "Rust", a 2003 song by Darkthrone from the album Hate Them
- "Rust", a 2015 song by Caligula's Horse from the album Bloom

== Places ==
=== Austria ===
- Rust, Burgenland, a city in Burgenland
- Rust im Tullnerfeld, a village in Lower Austria

=== Germany ===
- Rust, Baden-Württemberg, a town
  - Europapark Rust, a theme park

=== United States ===
- El Cerrito, California, formerly known as Rust
- Rust Belt, a northern post-industrial region
- Rust Township, Michigan

== Science and technology ==
- Rust (color), a red-brown color resembling iron oxide
- Rust (programming language), a general purpose programming language focused on performance and memory safety
- Rust (fungus), fungal plant pathogens of the order Pucciniales

== Other uses ==
- Rust (surname)

== See also ==
- Russ (disambiguation)
- Rusty (disambiguation)
