= Childhood Education International =

Non-profit educational organization

- Formation: 1931; 95 years ago
- Type: 501(c)(3) educational nonprofit
- Publication: "Childhood Education: Innovations," "Journal of Research in Childhood Education," "Childhood Explorer," and more
- Website: ceinternational1892.org
- Formerly called: Association for Childhood Education International

Childhood Education International is an American nonprofit educational organization with membership. It is a global community of educators and advocates who advocate for desirable conditions, programs, and practices affecting children, from infancy through adulthood. It was established as the Association for Childhood Education by the merger of the International Kindergarten Union and the National Council of Primary Education in 1931 and changed its name in 2019.

Childhood Education International members include educators, students, child care center directors and staff, and other organizations. It was recognized as a nonprofit 501(c)3 in 1959 and is based in Washington, D.C.

== History ==
Childhood Education International was established as the International Kindergarten Union (IKU) in 1892, by educators concerned with the professional preparation of kindergarten teachers. In 1931, the National Council of Primary Education joined with the IKU to form the Association for Childhood Education (ACE). Many ACE members were professionals with an international focus, and so ACE added “International” to its name in 1946, becoming the Association for Childhood Education International (ACEI).

In the late 1800s and early 1900s, members worked in immigrant communities in the United States to improve conditions for children living in slums and other types of settlement communities. Association members worked on behalf of children worldwide who were living in conditions of poverty or facing other challenging circumstances, such as discrimination, war, and hunger.

After World War I, ACEI offered support for kindergarten units that were organized to help refugee children in France. During the Great Depression in the United States, ACEI was hired by the Works Progress Administration (WPA) to publish materials for nursery school teachers. During World War II, ACEI sent books, toys, and curriculum materials to teachers and children in Austria, Yugoslavia, Greece, and Italy.

In 1949, ACEI denied requests from three state associations to have separate associations for black and white educators. In 1950, ACEI revised its Guide for Groups Wishing to Extend Invitations to ACEI to state that African-American members would have equal access to hotels, restaurants, and public transportation.

In the mid-1960s, ACEI supported U.S. efforts to prepare young children living in poverty for school, and partnered with organizations to develop training kits for Project Head Start training centers throughout the country. Its focus was on children ages two through twelve. In the 1970s, ACEI's local chapters worked to create professional relationships and connections between teachers, administrators, and their community.

In February 2019, ACEI officially changed its name to Childhood Education International.

== Governance ==
The Constitution was approved by the membership on March 20, 2009, in Chicago, and can be accessed at www.acei.org. Childhood Education International has a Constitution which outlines the governance structure of the organization and was approved by the membership. ACEI Bylaws, developed by the Childhood Education International Board of Directors, serve as policies and procedures of the Board.

Childhood Education International has members throughout the world. Members of the Board of Directors hold two- to three-year terms; the Executive Director serves as an ex officio member. An International Advisory Council provides additional guidance.

The organization has branches throughout the United States and in other countries. The branches are grouped by statewide organizations for annual meetings.

== Programs and initiatives ==
- The Love, Me, Teach Me – campaign promotes the needs and rights of children everywhere.
- The Center for Education Diplomacy – explores and shares the skills of diplomacy needed to impact the course of global education.
- Global Schools First – is an assessment and recognition for primary schools committed to global citizenship education.
- Innovation Exchange – explores groundbreaking and pioneering initiatives and ideas in education from around the globe.
- Childhood Education International and the United Nations – Childhood Education International has consultative status at the United Nations and membership in the NGO Committee on UNICEF.
- The Global Guidelines for Early Childhood Education and Care in the 21st Century were developed as a collaborative project between the U.S. National Committee of the World Organization for Early Childhood (OMEP) and ACEI. The guidelines address the elements necessary to create quality early care and education environments for young children around the world. An assessment resource is available in nine languages, and training outreach is conducted.
- Childhood Education International – supports the U.S. ratification of the United Nations Convention on the Rights of the Child.

== Publications ==
ACEI’s flagship publication is Childhood Education: Innovations, first published in 1924. Childhood Education: Innovations is published six times a year. Each issue includes articles that describe organizations, practices, or projects that are taking truly innovative approaches to education, or present new perspectives on an existing practice that result in an innovative approach.

The Journal of Research in Childhood Education is a quarterly publication featuring peer-reviewed articles that advance knowledge and theory of the education of children, infancy through early adolescence. Issues provide reports of empirical research, theoretical articles, ethnographic and case studies, participant observation studies, and studies deriving data collected from naturalistic settings.
