= Lucy Wheelock =

American early childhood education pioneer

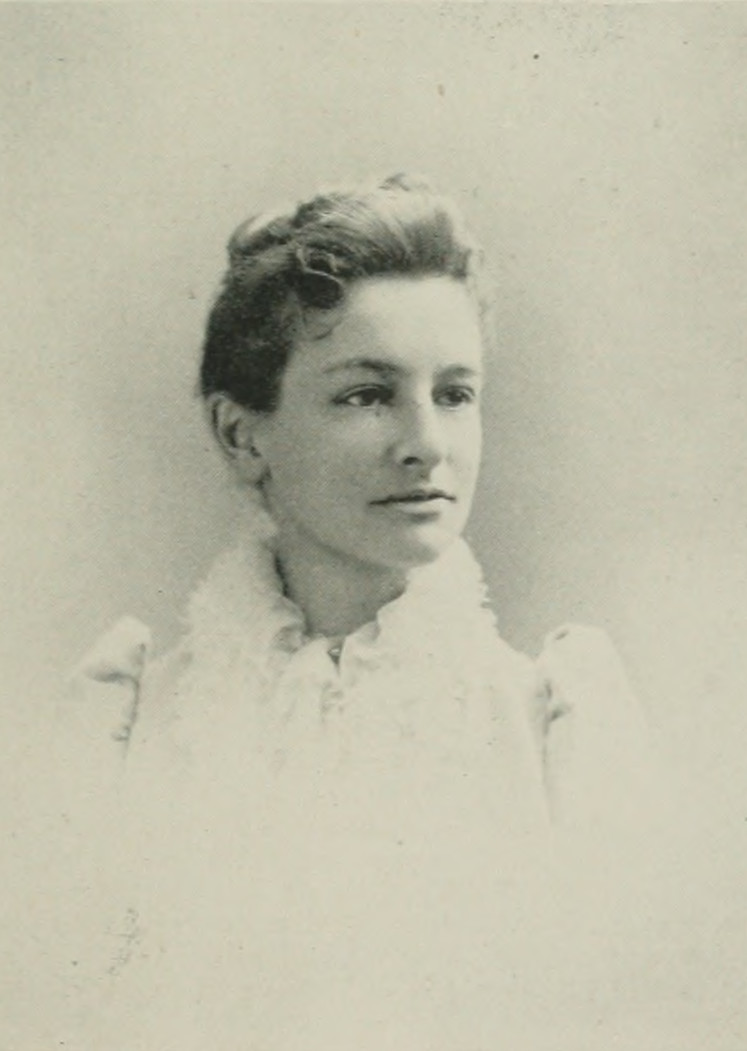
- "A Woman of the Century"
- Born: February 1, 1857; Cambridge, Vermont, U.S.
- Died: October 1, 1946 (aged 89); Boston, Massachusetts, U.S.
- Resting place: Mountain View Cemetery, Cambridge, Vermont, U.S.
- Education: Chauncy-Hall School
- Occupation: early childhood education pioneer within the American kindergarten movement
- Relatives: John Adams
- Writing career
- Language: English
- Subject: kindergarten education
- Movement: Fröbel system

Lucy Wheelock (February 1, 1857 – October 1, 1946) was an American early childhood education pioneer in the American kindergarten movement. She began her career by teaching the kindergarten program at Chauncy-Hall School (1879–89). Wheelock was the founder and head of Wheelock Kindergarten Training School, which later became Wheelock College in Boston, Massachusetts, and is now the namesake of Boston University's college of education BU Wheelock. She was a writer, lecturer, and translator in the field of education.

== Early life and education ==
Lucy Wheelock was born in Cambridge, Vermont, February 1, 1857. Her parents included Edwin and Laura (Pierce) Wheelock, and five siblings. Her father, a descendant of John Adams, had been a pastor for many years in Cambridge.

Wheelock's education began under the care of her mother. She was a student at the Underhill Academy in Vermont, and the public high school in Reading, Massachusetts, from which she graduated in 1874. In preparation for entry to Wellesley College, she studied at Chauncy-Hall School, in Boston, where she became an excellent classical and German scholar, and a writer of both prose and verse. Towards the close of her course in that school, she was drawn towards the education of very young children according to the kindergarten system, and abandoned her plans for Wellesley. Instead, she took a thorough course of instruction at the Kindergarten Training School conducted by Ella Frances Snelling Hatch, receiving her diploma in 1879 from Elizabeth Peabody. She continued her studies in Europe under Johann Heinrich Pestalozzi and Maria Montessori.

== Career ==
=== Educator ===
Wheelock began to teach in the recently established kindergarten of the Chauncy-Hall School, remaining in that role for about 10 years. Her work made her a successful exponent and advocate of the system of Friedrich Fröbel, which she was often called upon to expound before educational institutes and conventions. For at least four years, she taught a training class of candidates for the kindergarten service, coming from all parts of the United States and Canada, increasing in number from year to year.

Established in 1888, she was the founder and head of Wheelock Kindergarten Training School. It became Wheelock College in 1939, or 1945. She served as president of the International Kindergarten Union (I.K.U., 1895–99); and was the chair of its Committee of Nineteen (1905–09) and chair, of the Committee for the Fröbel Pilgrimage (1911).

=== Lecturer ===
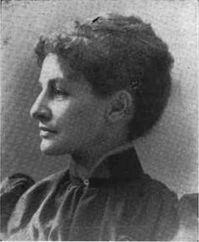
Lucy Wheelock

Her interest in young children led her into Sunday school work, and she soon became superintendent of a large primary class connected with the Berkeley Temple, in Boston. Her success in that work won her a reputation, and she became a favorite speaker in Sunday school institutes and gatherings, as well as those for general educational purposes in New England, Philadelphia, Pittsburgh, St Louis, Chicago, Minneapolis, St. Paul, and Montreal. Wheelock devoted a great part of her summer vacation to work of that sort. She also taught a large class of adults in the Summer School of Methods in Martha's Vineyard, and gave a model lesson weekly, for eight months in the year, to a class of about 200 primary Sunday school teachers.

=== Writer and translator ===
In addition to her lecture work, Wheelock translated for Barnard's Journal of Education several important German works, and contributed many practical articles to other educational journals. She also translated and published several of Johanna Spyri's popular stories for children, under the title of Red Letter Tales. She published weekly in The Congregationalist Magazine a department called "Hints to Primary Teachers", in the same line of work. Her unpublished autobiography is titled My life story.

== Personal life and death ==
Wheelock was a member of the Twentieth Century Club. She died in Boston, October 1, 1946. Her papers are held by Wheelock College.

== Selected works ==
- Over and over, and other stories
- Jack and Ted, and other stories, 18??
- Nettie's muff : and other stories, 18??
- Polly's minutes, and other stories, 18??
- A rainy day, and other stories, 18??
- The Hobby horse, and other stories, 188?
- Ben and the berries, and other stories, 188?
- Froebel materials to aid a comprehension of the work of the founder of the kindergarten. ..., 1887
- Sara's gift, and other stories, 1890
- Child songs, 1890
- The Moral Influence of the Kindergarten, 1893
- Old testament stories, 1894
- Ideal Relation of Kindergarten to Primary Schools, 1894
- Clare's thanksgiving bag, and other stories, 1894
- Spice and allspice, and other stories, 1894
- Daisy's lesson : and other stories, 1894
- Reubie's resolve, and other stories, 1894
- Letters from Europe, 1903
- Report for Committee of Nineteen of the International Kindergarten Union, 1907
- Kindergarten Pilgrimage to the Haunts of Froebel, 1910
- The Froebel Pilgrimage of 1911, 1911
- Signs of Kindergarten Progress, 1911
- The function of the kindergarten in the public-school system., 1912
- The Little White Schoolhouse, 1915
- What's in a Name?, 1918
- The Kindergarten children's hour, 1920
- Talks to mothers, 1920
- Pioneers of the Kindergarten in America, 1923
- Ideas and Ideals, 1924
- The Wheelock School, 1926
- Annie Laws, 1927
- The kindergarten in New England, 1935
- History of the kindergarten movement in the mid-western states and in New York, 1938
- History of the kindergarten movement in the southeastern states and Delaware, 1939
- From the Kindergarten to the Primary School, 1942
- Childhood days, 19??

== See also ==
- Ralph Wheelock
