= Annie Coolidge Rust =

American educator

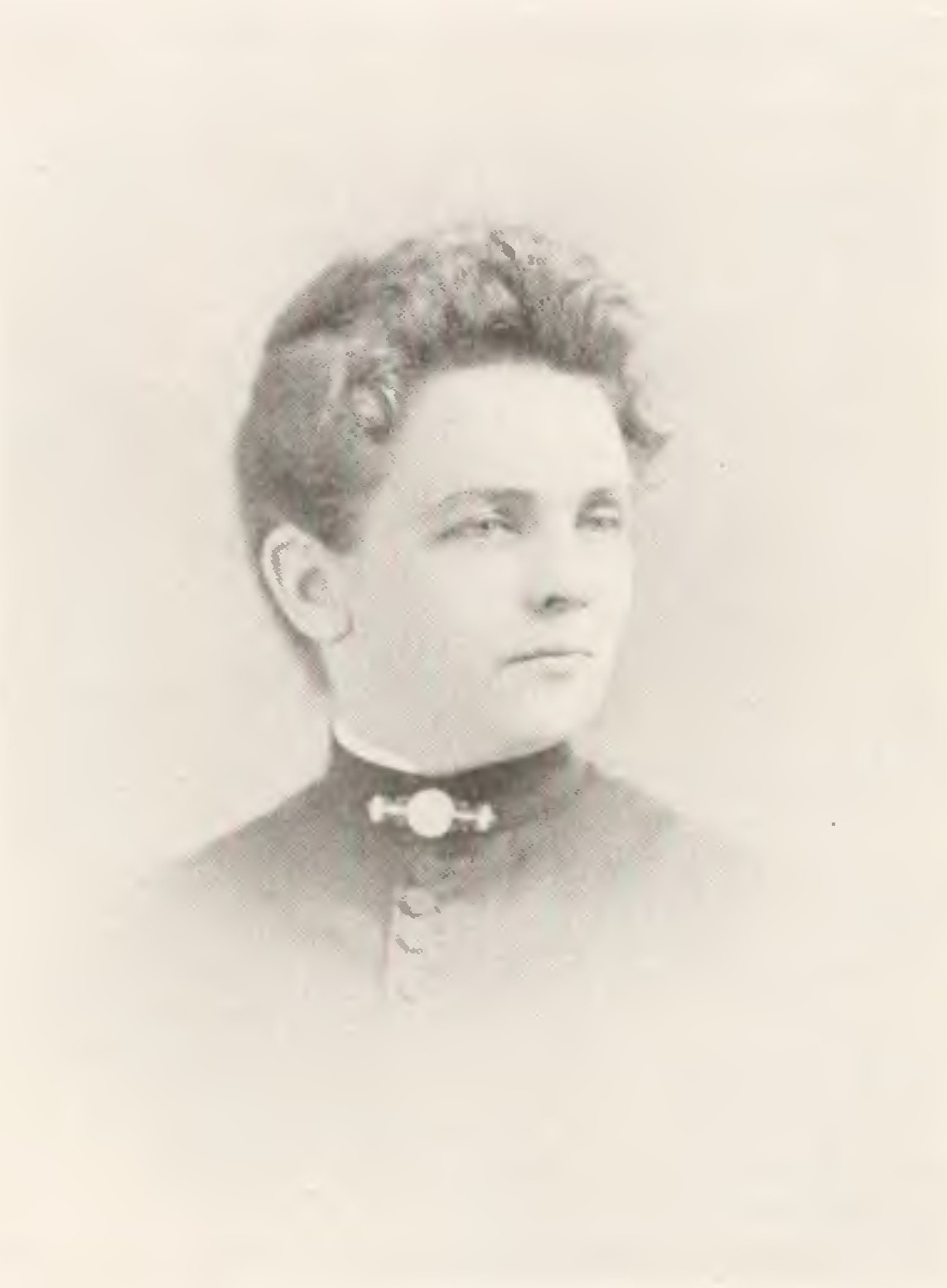
- Born: 19th-century U.S. state of Virginia
- Occupation: educator
- Known for: founder of the Miss Annie Coolidge Rust's Froebel School of Kindergarten Normal Classes

Annie Coolidge Rust was a 19th-century American educator from the U.S. state of Virginia. A proponent of the Froebelian method, she focused on kindergarten training schools, playground courses, and a mother's course. She is remembered as the founder of the Miss Annie Coolidge Rust's Froebel School of Kindergarten Normal Classes.

== Early life and education ==
Annie Coolidge Rust was born in Richmond, Virginia, one of a family of nine children. Her father, Thomas Adams Rust, a successful hardware merchant in Richmond, was a native of Salem, Massachusetts. The mother, born Phoebe Cutler Chamberlain, was from New Hampshire, but had moved to Boston with her parents when she was a child. She was well educated and very active in church affairs in Boston. The parents agreed that a part of each year should be passed in Boston, the rest of the time being in spent at their Southern home in Richmond.

While their children were still young, the family removed to Cambridge, Massachusetts, and, after some of the children were graduated from the Cambridge schools, the family removed to Boston. The mother believed that it would be important for Rust to have a knowledge of the Froebelian principles of education, known as the Kindergarten System. While visiting a friend in Cambridge one day, she learned of a Kindergarten and Normal Class, which Madame Matilda H. Kreige and her daughter, Alma Kreige, from Berlin, had opened in Boston, they having been requested by their teacher, Baroness Bertha von Marenholtz-Bülow, to come to the US and introduce this system of education. Rust entered the school as a pupil in one of the first Normal Classes, and after a successful course of study, was graduated in June.

== Career ==
A summer kindergarten was offered to Rust, which she accepted, she being one of the first pupils of Madame Kreige to teach. In the following autumn, an opportunity to teach a private kindergarten with a large salary was offered her in the West, which she accepted. Access was also given her to the private libraries of the influential people of the city. At the approach of spring, Rust found that the climate did not agree with her, and felt obliged to give up her position and return to Boston. Not long after, a lady came to Boston to secure a teacher for a private school near New York City and Rust was engaged for this position. One of the mothers, a patron, sending three children to the school, was so pleased that she invited Rust to come to live in her home, which she did, and remained through one school year, teaching the older children music on kindergarten principles, at the same time that she was holding her position as teacher of the private school. At the close of this school year, Rust was invited to visit the family at their summer home on the seashore. From there, she was called South by her father and mother, to assist in the disposition of some family property. She remained South through a part of the summer until this was accomplished, the family returning in the autumn to their own house in Boston.

A parent who had heard of Rust through Madame Kreige desired that she should open a private kindergarten at Rust's own house, saying she would secure pupils for her from her own friends, which she did. The arrangement pleased Rust as she was able to do more for the children under this arrangement. Subsequently, a lengthy article appeared in the Boston Transcript, written by one of the pupil's mothers relating to Rust's work. As a result, there were many visitors to the kindergarten. An educator from Chicago, after a visit to the school, pronounced the education to be exemplary, and said that he would like to take some of the material as a means of rendering instruction to students in some of the higher levels. The class increased in numbers, until a larger room was needed. Here a Mothers' Class was started; and, as Rust considered herself too much of a novice to assume the responsibility of this class, at her request Elizabeth Peabody took the charge.

After one of the patrons of this school removed to Brookline, arrangements were made for an afternoon kindergarten to be established in her home to be run by Rust. This kindergarten was carried on until the city classes had grown to such a size that they required Rust's full attention. Children were received from three years of age, until the age of 12. All the instruction was given upon Froebelian principles.

In the meantime, the school had grown to such a size that a house was taken, and Rust associated herself with a kindergarten-trained mother; they together undertaking the establishment of a Kindergarten Normal Class for young ladies. At this time it was deemed advisable to establish a school in a new location out of the city, with larger grounds. A location quite near Boston was decided upon and a kindergarten was soon started by Rust, and after three years' time here again were the different classes above the kindergarten department. It was impossible to secure suitable rooms for the size of the school, and for this reason, for a time, the school was limited to nearly one-half, consequently the patrons decided to build a model building, with the understanding that Rust should hire the building and carry on her school. During the summer, Rust was often consulted as to the best arrangement of the building, and helped in its plans, she coming for this purpose several times from the seashore at Magnolia where she usually passed her summers, having nature-study classes, thus collecting specimens of sea flora, minerals, and so forth, for the fall classes of the new school.

But when Rust realized she would be unable to make it the model school she desired, or add to it her Kindergarten Normal Classes, she sought other opportunities. About this time, an urgent appeal came to Rust from a Western city to accept the position of head instructor in a Kindergarten Normal Class, which had been started by the Free Kindergarten Association, and also as instructor in one of the free kindergartens, numbering 100 children, started that autumn, both of which she accepted. She was also very successful with the Normal Class. But the climate of that city, with its strong lake winds, was too severe for Rust, and she was suddenly taken will with pneumonia. Upon her recovery, she was unable to resume her work there, so she returned to Boston After a short rest, she was advised to go to an inland city, and having an opportunity to purchase in Worcester a private school, of children from 3–12 years of age, she accepted, naming it the Froebel School, at the same time starting a Kindergarten Normal Class, being urged to do this by a member of the Massachusetts Board of Education, as there was no such Training School in Worcester. Her work there was successful, graduating large classes. Rust also gave talks before different clubs in that city and elsewhere.

After several years of successful work in Worcester, Rust realized that she was shut off from many things with which she needed to keep in touch in order to grow. She then returned to her former home, Boston, where she would have certain advantages, and here re-established herself in her Kindergarten Normal Classes. Although urged by former pupils, being now parents, to again organize a kindergarten and school for children, she decided to give her time to the instruction of Normal Classes only (at the New Century Building) and to give talks before clubs.

== Miss Annie Coolidge Rust's Froebel School of Kindergarten Normal Classes ==
Rust's Froebel School of Kindergarten Normal Classes occupied the Pierce Building, Copley Square, Boston. The aim of the school was to prepare young women as kindergarten, primary, and playground teachers, and to give non-professional courses. Supplementary classes were offered in history and principles of education, symbolic education, music, voice training, physical training applied to games; also special lectures by educators, observation and practice teaching, and a short course in Montessori methods.

== Affiliations ==
Rust was a member of the American Froebel Union; this became the Kindergarten Department of the National Educational Association. She was a member of the Eastern Kindergarten Association, the National Education Association, the International Kindergarten Union, and the Women's Educational and Industrial Union. She was formerly a member of the Worcester Woman's Club, and helped to organize the Women in Council Club, Roxbury, Massachusetts. She belonged to Trinity Church, Boston.
