= Susan Blow =

American educator (1843–1916)

- Susan Blow (left) with Elizabeth Harrison (center) in 1905
- Born: Susan Elizabeth Blow; June 7, 1843; Carondelet, Missouri, US
- Died: March 27, 1916 (aged 72); New York City, US

Susan Elizabeth Blow (June 7, 1843 – March 27, 1916) was an American educator who opened the first successful public kindergarten in the United States. She was known as the "Mother of the Kindergarten."

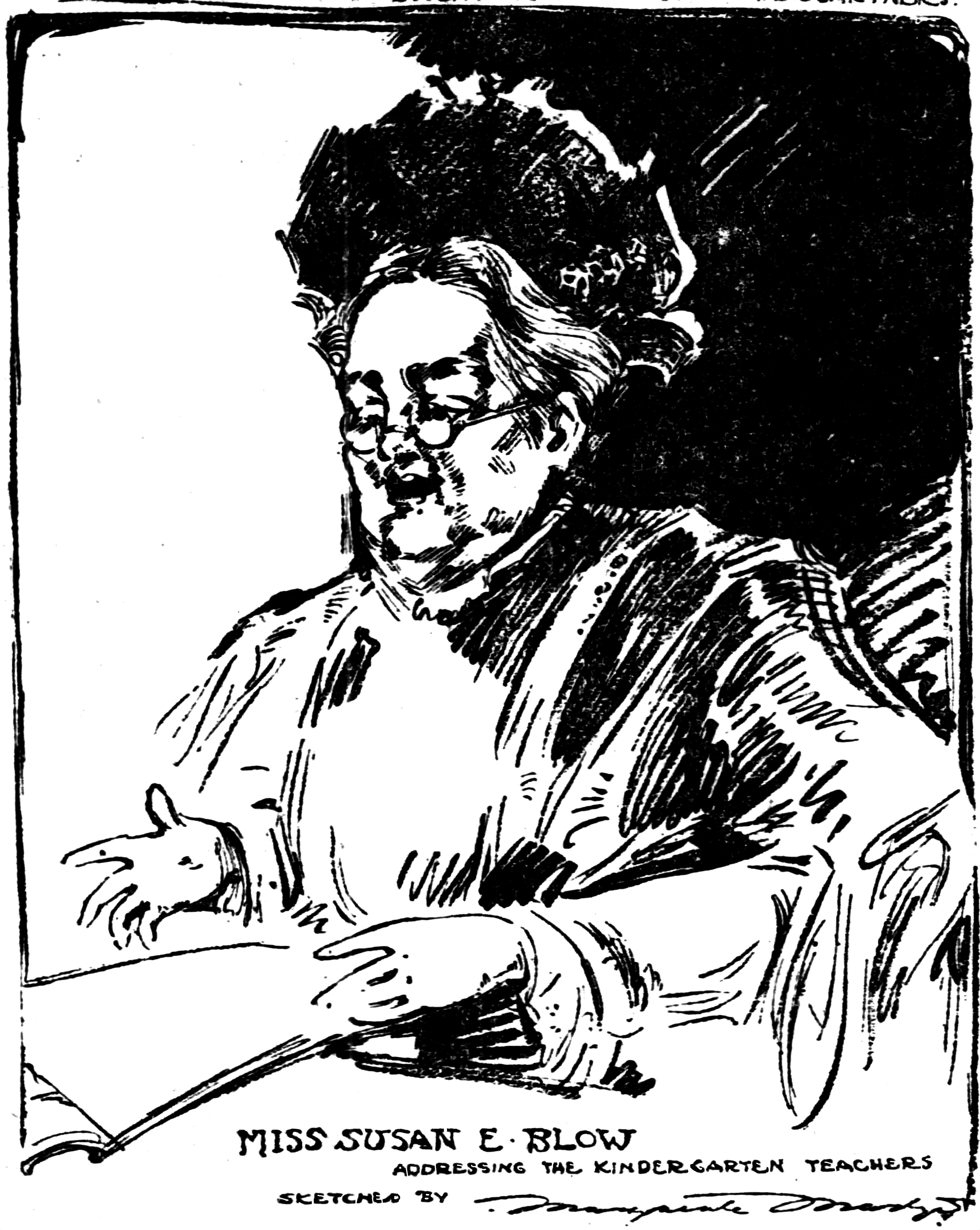
Sketch of Susan E. Blow by Marguerite Martyn, 1909

== Early life ==
Susan Blow was the eldest of nine children. She was the daughter of Henry Taylor Blow and Minerva Grimsley Blow. Henry owned various lead-mining operations. He was the president of the Iron Mountain Railroad. He was a state senator, and he was a minister to Brazil and Venezuela. Minerva was the daughter of a prominent manufacturer and local politician. The Blow children grew up in a deeply religious family. They were surrounded by comfort, wealth, and high German culture. Henry Blow founded a Presbyterian church in St. Louis. Her grandfather was Captain Peter Blow, the owner of the slave Dred Scott, who later challenged the slavery issue in court.

Blow received her education from her parents, various governesses, private tutors, and schools, due to her family's social status. Her parents highly valued education for their daughters, although this was uncommon for Victorian families. Henry Blow contributed funds to build a public school which was named after him. At age eight, Susan was enrolled at the William McCartney School in New Orleans, Louisiana. She attended classes there for the next two years. Blow and her sister Nellie enrolled in the New York school of Henrietta Haynes at age sixteen. They were forced to return home due to the outbreak of the Civil War. Blow tutored her younger brothers and sister, and she taught Sunday school at Carleton Presbyterian Church during this time.

Blow met and fell in love with a soldier named Colonel William Cole, at age twenty, but her parents found him to be unsuitable. Cole eventually was discharged for medical reasons. Blow's father took her to Washington, D.C., and introduced her to another military man who was more to his liking. Blow never married. She was considered a member of the St. Louis School, a literary, philosophical, and educational movement.

President Ulysses S. Grant appointed Henry Blow to be the minister to Brazil in 1869, and Susan went with him as his secretary. She quickly learned Portuguese during the next fifteen months. Her bilingual ability helped to ease trade communications between Brazil and the United States.

Blow went abroad to Europe in 1870, along with her mother and siblings. Susan began studying the philosophies of Hegel and the American Transcendentalists while in Europe. Susan came across the kindergarten teaching methods of German idealist and philosopher Friedrich Fröbel. Fröbel believed in "learning-through-play" and cognitive development. Susan was inspired to bring these ideas to St. Louis, and her father offered to set up a kindergarten as a private school. Susan felt that she was going to be able to serve the children better through the public school system.

== Career ==
In 1871 Blow traveled to New York, where she spent a year being trained at the New York Normal Training Kindergarten, operated by Fröbel devotee Maria Kraus-Boelté. Blow returned to St. Louis in 1873 and opened the nation's first public kindergarten in Des Peres School in Carondelet, which by then had been annexed by the City of St. Louis. With the help of her two assistants, Mary Timberlake and Cynthia Dozier, Blow directed and taught a kindergarten class consisting of forty-two students. Not only did she pay all expenses to keep the kindergarten running that first year, she was not compensated for her hard work and dedication. About 150 women also volunteered to work at Blow's kindergartens between 1876 and 1877.

In the kindergarten class, students learned from games and songs that Susan translated from Fröbel's original German. Students played with different shaped blocks, papers and clay, and tried weaving and modeling to improve dexterity. Children also grew seeds in an outdoor garden. Blow would tell stories from the Bible or myths and legends. The classroom was much more cheerful than upper grades. The experimental class was a success and quickly grew. Within three years, her kindergarten system had fifty teachers and over one thousand students, and by 1883 every public school in St. Louis had a kindergarten.

In 1875, the school board attempted to close the kindergartens in order to save money, but 1,500 signed a petition to keep them open. In 1876, the United States Centennial Commission in Philadelphia gave St. Louis and Blow an award for excellence of kindergarten in public schools.

Blow was able to open her school, in part, thanks to the support she received from William Torrey Harris, the superintendent of schools in St. Louis. Harris believed the greatest educational concern of the time was the number of young children who dropped out of school. Blow believed a kindergarten system would improve the dropout rate, for children would be starting school at an earlier age. Although he originally resisted the idea of a public program, he was persuaded by the school board's support of Blow, her background, and her proposal to direct the program herself.

In 1874 Blow opened a training school to accommodate the in-demand kindergarten teachers. Those in training spent mornings volunteering in the kindergarten classes and afternoons and weekends studying Fröbel's ideas. Through her work, Blow played a significant role in the history and development of early childhood education.

Susan Blow was recognized with a star on the St. Louis Walk of Fame, for her pioneering work.

== Later life and death ==
Only ten years after opening her training school Blow withdrew from teaching due to Graves' disease, which is a form of hyperthyroidism. She retired in 1884 and moved to Boston with Laura Fischer, who moved there to direct the kindergarten program at Boston Public Schools. Blow wrote a book on Dante in 1890, and five books on Fröbel's theories, in her retirement. She also helped to found the International Kindergarten Union, and she held a three-year appointment to the Teachers College of Columbia University.

Blow moved to Cazenovia, New York, in 1895, in order to be near one of her sisters. She lectured on early childhood education all over the county, only stopping about a month before her death.

She died in March 1916 in New York City. Most references state she died on March 26, but her tombstone at Bellefontaine Cemetery in St. Louis declares that she died on March 27. The St. Louis Globe-Democrat wrote at the time of her death, “A great commander is gone, but the soldiers will go marching on.” St. Louis celebrated Susan in April of 1916 with a meeting of the Susan E. Blow Froebel League. A memorial fund was set up in her name in order to sponsor lectures. The organization did not last long, as many of Blow's ideas were German in origin and the United States entered World War I the following year. An early public elementary school in the Carondolet neighborhood of St. Louis was named for her father. It used to be known as Blow Elementary. It is known today as the Lyon Academy at Blow.

Blow Street, which runs through South St. Louis city, from the Mississippi River at S. Broadway to the St. Louis Hills neighborhood, also bears her family name.

== Writings ==
Blow served on the advisory committee for the International Kindergarten Union and Committee of Nineteen and translated two volumes of Fröbel's Mother Play in 1895. She also wrote articles in the ‘’Kindergarten Magazine’’. Below is a list of Blow's published works:

- 1894: Symbolic Education
- 1899: Letters to a Mother on the Philosophy of Froebel
- 1900: Kindergarten Education
- 1908: Educational Issues in the Kindergarten
