= Elizabeth Harrison (educator) =

American educator (1849–1927)

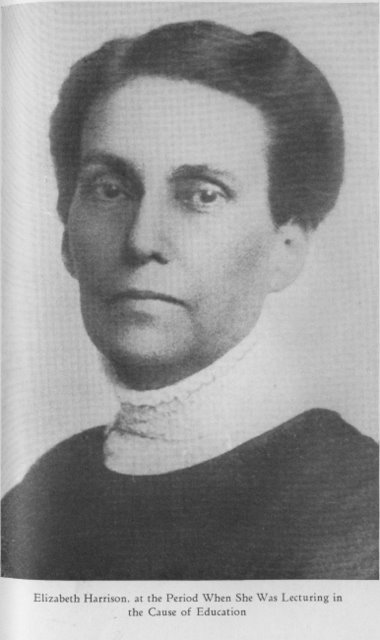
- Photograph from Sketches Along Life's Road
- Born: September 1, 1849; Athens, Kentucky, U.S.
- Died: October 31, 1927 (aged 78); San Antonio, Texas, U.S.
- Occupations: College President, founder, educator, and author
- Writing career
- Pen name: Elizabeth Harrison

Elizabeth Harrison (September 1, 1849 – October 31, 1927) was an American educator from Kentucky. She was the founder and first president of what is today National Louis University in Chicago, Illinois. Harrison was a pioneer in creating professional standards for early childhood teachers and in promoting early childhood education.

== Life ==
Elizabeth Harrison was born in Athens, Kentucky, the fourth child of Elizabeth Thompson Bullock and Isaac Webb Harrison. According to the 1850 census, Isaac Harrison was a merchant there. The family moved to Midway, Kentucky, then to Davenport, Iowa, where by 1870 he was described in the census as a land agent. Elizabeth Harrison was invited to Chicago in 1879 by her friend Mrs. W.O. Richardson to pursue a career in education. After encountering the early kindergarten movement in Chicago and studying with early kindergarten educator Alice Putnam, Harrison sought further training in St. Louis and New York. She then taught kindergarten in Iowa and Chicago.

== Educational leadership ==
Involving mothers in education, Harrison and Putnam founded the Chicago Kindergarten Club in 1883, influenced by the book Mothers at Play by Friedrich Fröbel. In 1886, Harrison founded a training school for kindergarten teachers in Chicago. Intrigued by the ideas used by a German woman working at her school, Harrison decided to find out more. She tracked these ideas back to the Pestalozzi-Fröbel-Haus in Berlin and in 1889 she traveled there to study. On her return she renamed her institution the Chicago Kindergarten Training College. Harrison's school became an innovative college of education. She was president of the college, expanded to the National Kindergarten and Elementary College, until her retirement in 1920. It is now part of National Louis University.

== Later life and death ==
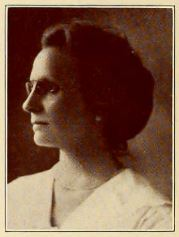
Belle Woodson, Supervisor of Kindergarten Practice Schools and Faculty Member at National Louis University, circa 1917

In 1903 Harrison co-wrote The Kindergarten Building Gifts with Belle Woodson, Instructor in Gifts and Occupations of the Chicago Kindergarten College. According to the 1910 census, Woodson (aged 41) and Harrison (aged 60) were living together on North Waller Avenue in Chicago. Woodson became the supervisor of Kindergarten Practice Schools and faculty for psychology, literature, architecture. Harrison's chronic bronchitis was perhaps the reason they moved to San Antonio, Texas, in 1922. Woodson and Harrison lived at 505 West Mulberry Street where, according to her death certificate, Harrison died from an asthma attack on October 31, 1927.

== Writings ==
During her career, Harrison wrote a number of books, including: A Study of Child Nature (1890 – which saw 50 editions published in the following years), In Storyland (1895), Some Silent Teachers (1903), Misunderstood Children (1908), Montessori and the Kindergarten (1913) and The Unseen Side of Child Life (1922). In 1893, the college published Harrison's book, The Kindergarten as an Influence in Modern Civilization, in which she explained, "how to teach the child from the beginning of his existence that all things are connected [and] how to lead him to this vital truth from his own observation . . .." Harrison's autobiography, Sketches Along Life's Road, was edited and published in Boston in 1930, after her death.

== Influence ==
Nobel Peace Prize winner, Jane Addams of Hull House, said of her colleague and friend, that Elizabeth Harrison "has done more good than any woman I know. She has brought light and power to all the educational world."

In the 1890s, Harrison organized a series of annual conferences in Chicago, which led to the founding of what is today the National Parent Teachers Association (PTA).

== External links and sources ==
- Works by Elizabeth Harrison at Project Gutenberg
- Works by Elizabeth Harrison at LibriVox (public domain audiobooks)
- Works by or about Elizabeth Harrison at the Internet Archive
- National-Louis University
- National–Louis University Online Archive and Special Collections
- Famous American Women: A Biographical Dictionary from Colonial Times to the Present ed. Robert McHenry (Merriam-Webster, Inc. 1980) p. 179.
